= East 149th Street station =

New York City Subway station in the Bronx

East 149 Street
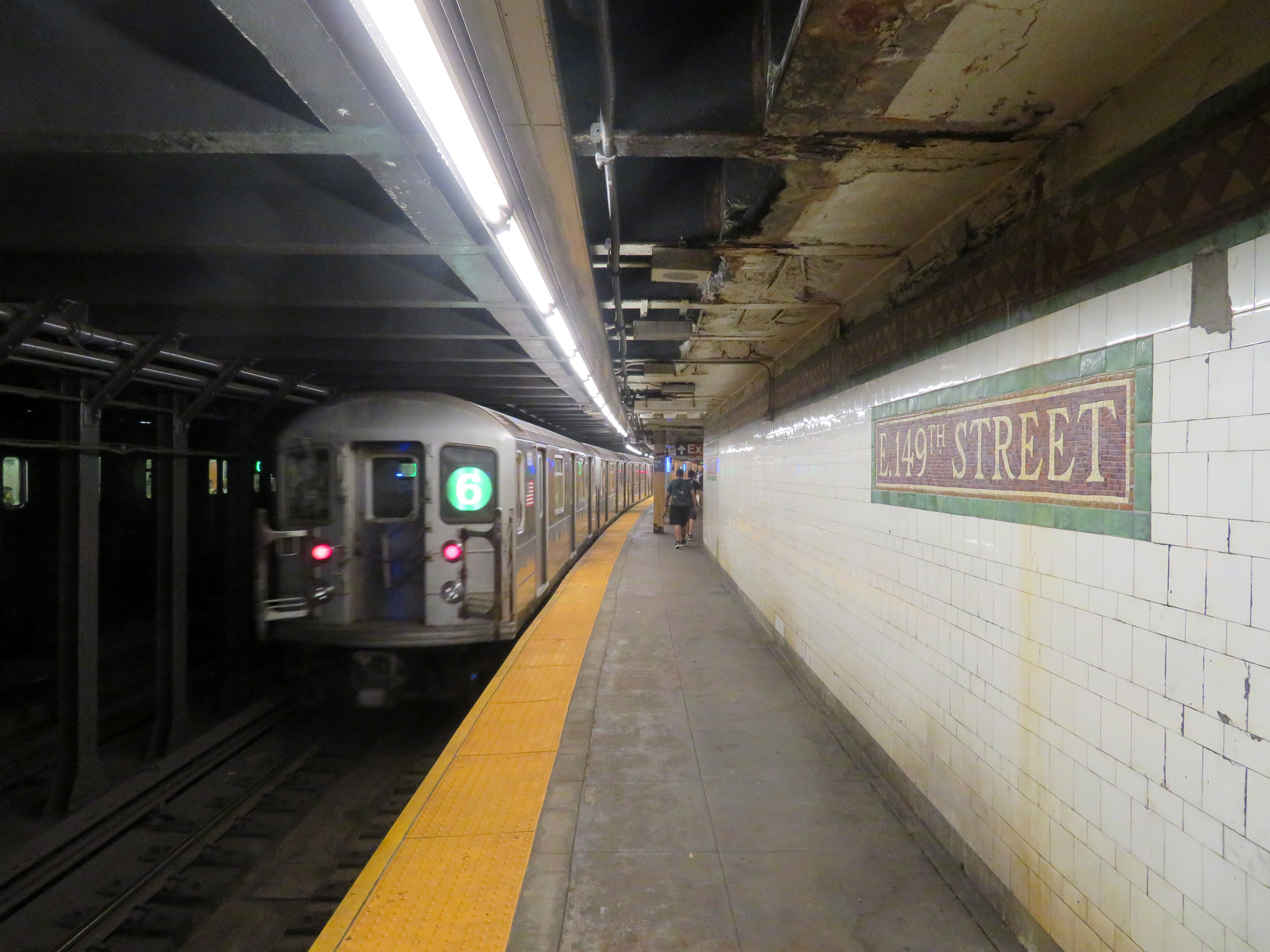
- A northbound 6 train leaving the station in 2018

Station statistics
- Address: East 149th Street and Southern Boulevard; Bronx, New York
- Borough: The Bronx
- Locale: Woodstock, Mott Haven
- Coordinates: 40.812088°N 73.904171°W
- Division: A (IRT)
- Line: IRT Pelham Line
- Services: 6 (all times)
- Transit: NYCT Bus: Bx17, Bx19
- Structure: Underground
- Platforms: 2 side platforms
- Tracks: 3

Other information
- Opened: January 7, 1919; 107 years ago
- Accessible: Yes

Traffic
- 2025: 1,007,649 ▲7.5%
- Rank: 308 out of 423
Services
Preceding station	New York City Subway	Following station
Longwood Avenue toward Pelham Bay Park	Local	East 143rd Street–St. Mary's Street toward Brooklyn Bridge–City Hall
does not stop here
Location
Location within New York City Subway
Location within New York City
Location within New York
Track layout
Street map
Station service legend
Symbol	Description
Stops all times	Stops all times

The East 149th Street station is a local station on the IRT Pelham Line of the New York City Subway. Located at the intersection of East 149th Street, Prospect Avenue, and Southern Boulevard in the Woodstock and Mott Haven neighborhoods of the Bronx, it is served by the 6 train at all times. The <6> train skips this station when it operates.

The station opened in 1919 as part of an extension of the Pelham Line of the Interborough Rapid Transit Company and had its platforms extended in the 1960s. The station became fully compliant with the Americans with Disabilities Act of 1990 in 2023.

== History ==
This station opened on January 7, 1919, as part of an extension of the Pelham Line from Third Avenue–138th Street to Hunts Point Avenue by the Interborough Rapid Transit Company. The station was built as part of the Dual Contracts.

Both platforms were extended at the west (railroad south) end in the 1960s to accommodate the current standard length of an IRT train (514 feet (157 m)). The extensions are noticeable as they are narrower than the rest of the platforms and the trim line is maroon with "E 149TH ST" in white sans serif font. The extensions result in the platforms being slightly offset.

In 2019, the Metropolitan Transportation Authority announced that this station would become ADA-accessible as part of the agency's 2020–2024 Capital Program. A contract for two elevators at the station was awarded in December 2020. The elevators opened for use on September 15, 2023.

== Station layout ==
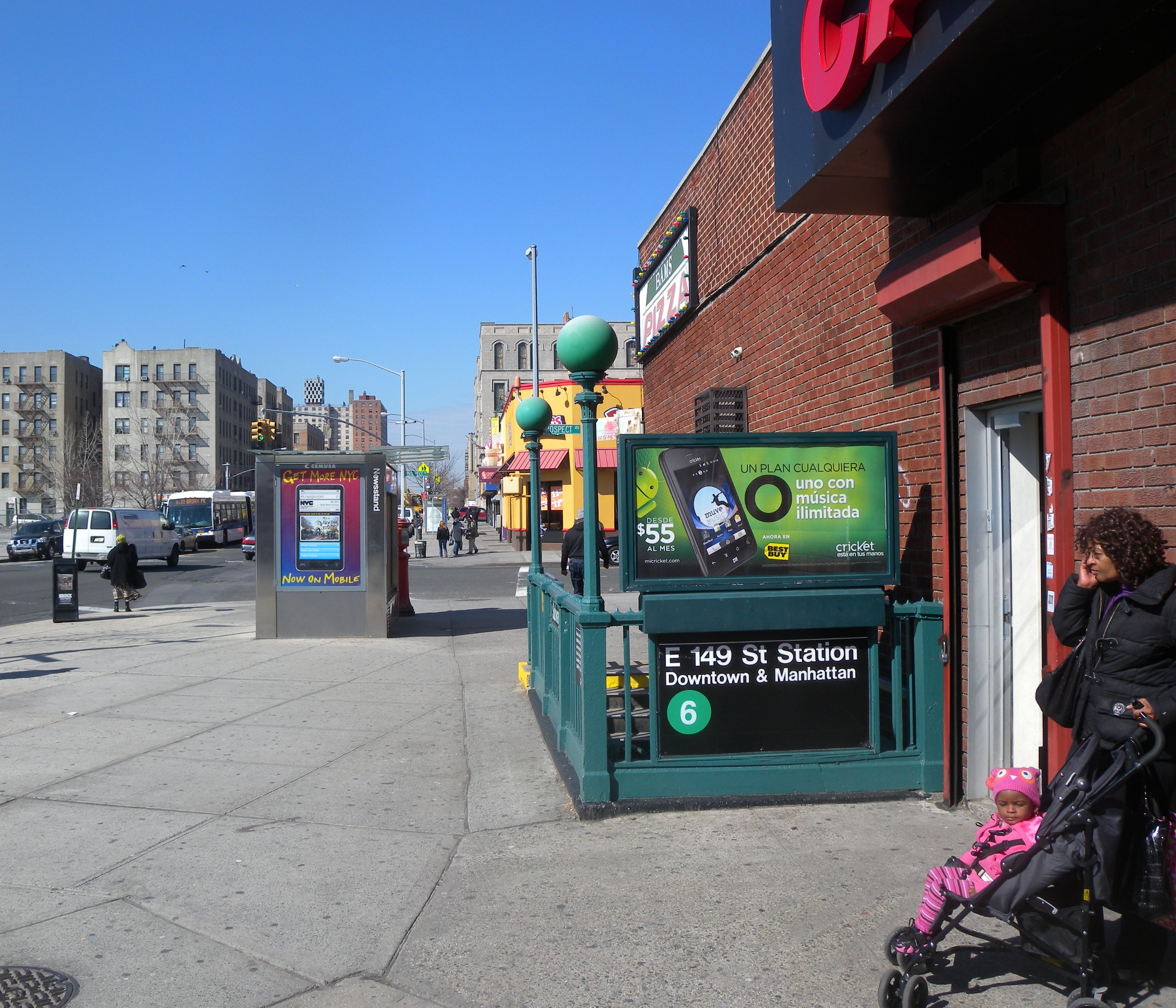
Street stair for downtown

This underground station has three tracks and two side platforms. The center express track is used by the weekday peak direction <6> service. The 6 local train serves the station at all times. The next stop to the south is East 143rd Street–St. Mary's Street, while the next stop to the north is Longwood Avenue.

Both platforms have their original Dual Contracts mosaic trim line and name tablets. "149" tablets for "East 149th Street" run along the trim line at regular intervals and the name tablets have "E. 149TH STREET" in all-caps, serif lettering. Yellow i-beam columns run along the platforms at either ends at regular intervals with every other one having the standard black name plate with white lettering.

There are no crossovers or crossunders to allow free transfers between directions. Closed newsstands on the platforms have been tiled over.

=== Exits ===
Both platforms have one same-level fare control area at the center. Each one has a turnstile bank, token booth, and two street stairs. The ones on the Pelham Bay Park-bound platform go up to either eastern corner of Southern Boulevard and East 149th Street while the ones on the Manhattan-bound platform go up to the northwest corner.

Elevators lead up from the southbound and northbound platforms to the northwestern and southeastern corners of Southern Boulevard and East 149th Street, respectively.
