= Longwood Avenue station =

New York City Subway station in the Bronx

Longwood Avenue
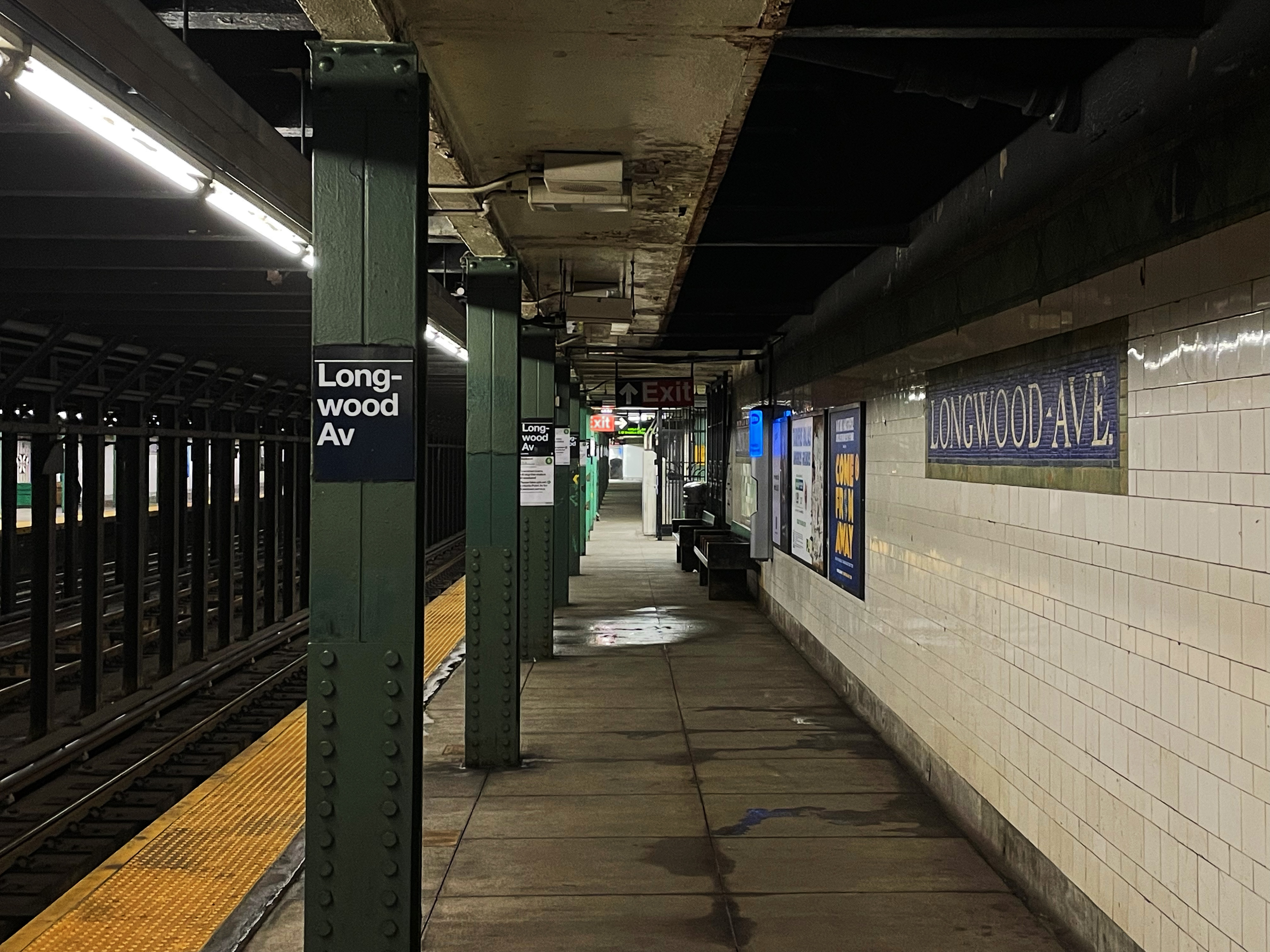
- View down southbound platform

Station statistics
- Address: Longwood Avenue and Southern Boulevard; Bronx, New York
- Borough: The Bronx
- Locale: Longwood
- Coordinates: 40.816278°N 73.896232°W
- Division: A (IRT)
- Line: IRT Pelham Line
- Services: 6 (all times)
- Transit: NYCT Bus: Bx19, Bx46
- Structure: Underground
- Platforms: 2 side platforms
- Tracks: 3

Other information
- Opened: January 7, 1919; 107 years ago

Traffic
- 2025: 658,603 ▼1.7%
- Rank: 361 out of 423
Services
Preceding station	New York City Subway	Following station
Hunts Point Avenue toward Pelham Bay Park	Local	East 149th Street toward Brooklyn Bridge–City Hall
does not stop here
Location
Location within New York City Subway
Location within New York City
Location within New York
Track layout
Street map
Station service legend
Symbol	Description
Stops all times	Stops all times

The Longwood Avenue station is a local station on the IRT Pelham Line of the New York City Subway. Located at Longwood Avenue and Southern Boulevard in the Longwood neighborhood of the Bronx, it is served by the 6 train at all times. The <6> train skips this station when it operates.

The station opened in 1919 as part of an extension of the Pelham Line of the Interborough Rapid Transit Company, and had its platforms extended in the 1960s. Further renovations were completed in 2019 and 2020.

== History ==
This station opened on January 7, 1919 as part of the extension of the Pelham Line from Third Avenue–138th Street to Hunts Point Avenue. The extension was completed by the Interborough Rapid Transit Company as part of the Dual Contracts with the New York City.

From October 28, 2019 to December 2019, the northbound platform was temporarily closed for repairs. From February 3, 2020 to April 10, 2020, the southbound platform was similarly temporarily closed for repairs.

== Station layout ==
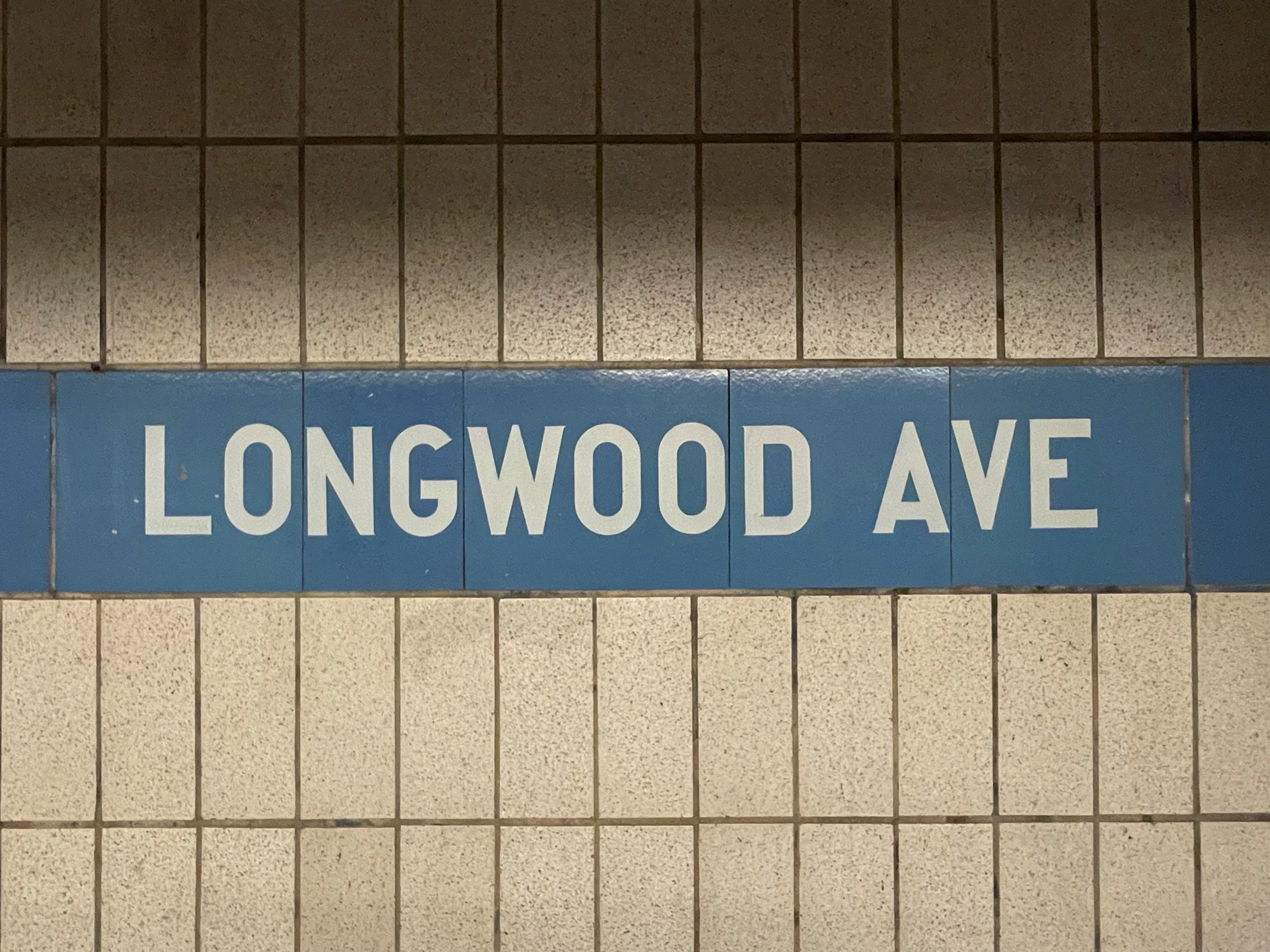
Platform extension trim line

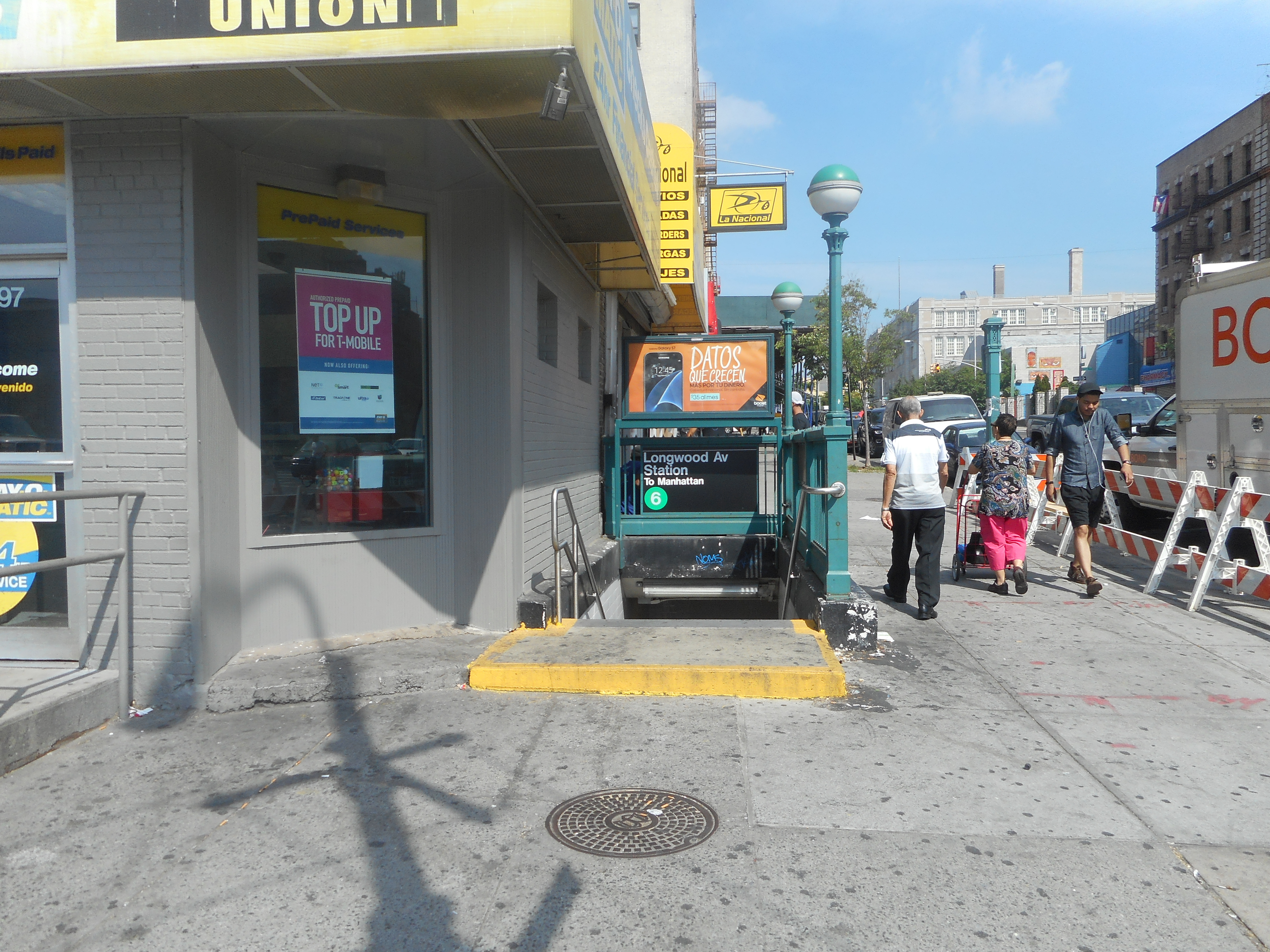
Manhattan-bound entrance

This underground station has three tracks and two side platforms. The center express track is used by the weekday peak direction <6> service. The 6 local train serves the station at all times. The next stop to the south is East 149th Street, while the next stop to the north is Hunts Point Avenue.

Both platforms have their original Dual Contracts mosaic trim line and name tablets. The Vickers geometric design shows a diamond pattern in sea-foam green with a border of darker green mixed with blue. "L" plaques for "Longwood Avenue" run along the trim line at regular intervals. The name tablets are bordered in mixed shades of green and brown, and read "LONGWOOD AVE." in all-caps, serif white lettering on a mottled blue background. Light green I-beam columns run along the platforms at their center at regular intervals with every other one having the standard black name plate with white lettering.

Both platforms were extended at either ends in the 1960s to accommodate the current standard length of an IRT train (514 feet (157 m)). The extensions are noticeable as they are narrower than the rest of the platforms, have no columns, and the trim line is blue with "LONGWOOD AVE" in white sans serif font. The extensions result in the platforms being slightly offset.

There are no crossovers or crossunders to allow free transfers between directions. The southbound platform has a green fiberglass bucket seat bench built in the extended area in the 1960s.

=== Exits ===
Both platforms have one same-level fare control area at the east (railroad north) end. Each one has a turnstile bank, token booth, and two street stairs. The ones on the Pelham Bay Park-bound platform go up to either southern corner of Southern Boulevard and Longwood Avenue while the ones on the Manhattan-bound platform go up to either northern corner.
