= Cypress Avenue station =

New York City Subway station in the Bronx

Cypress Avenue
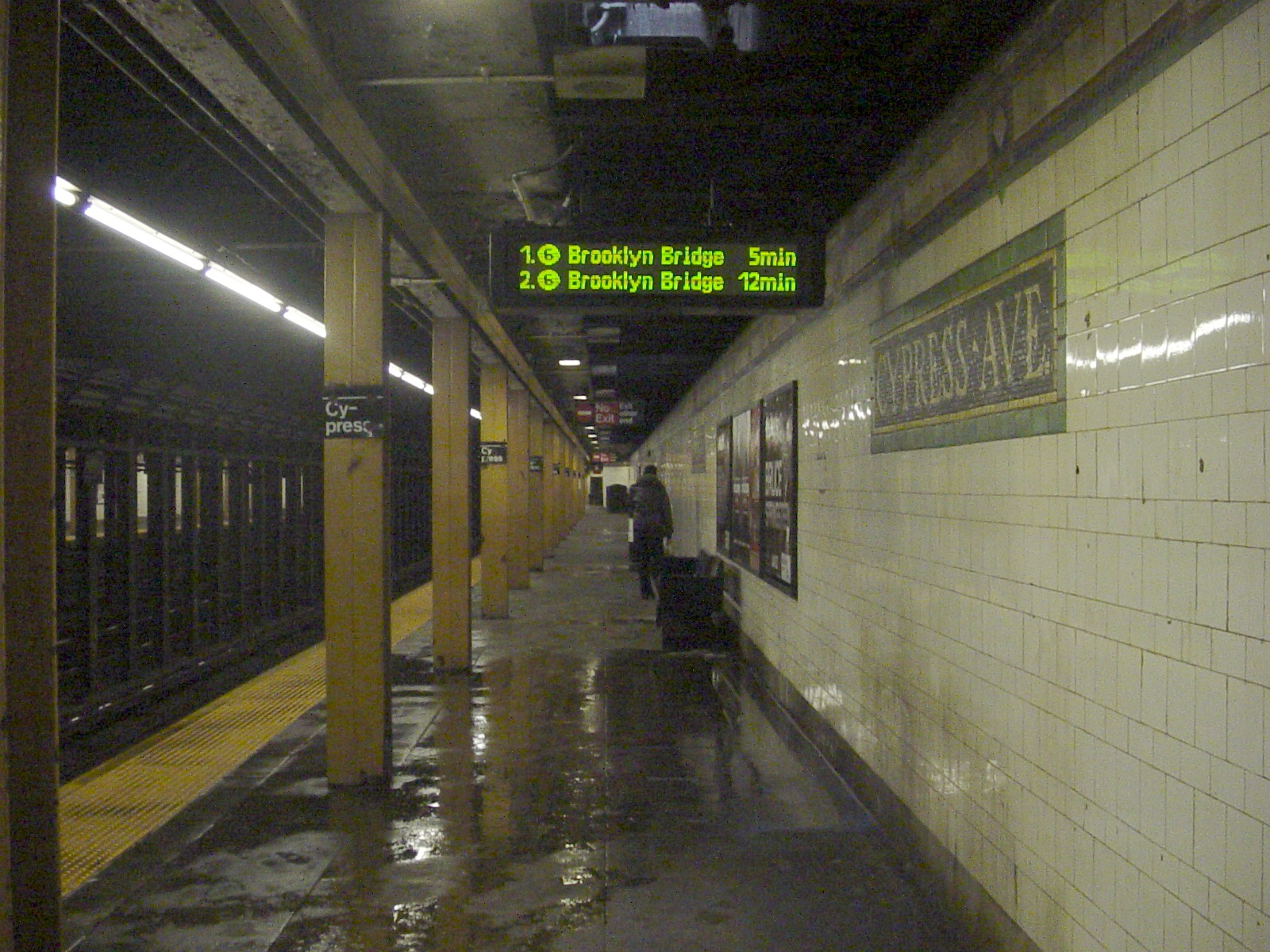
- Southbound platform with countdown clock

Station statistics
- Address: Cypress Avenue and East 138th Street; Bronx, New York
- Borough: The Bronx
- Locale: Mott Haven, Port Morris
- Coordinates: 40.805526°N 73.914514°W
- Division: A (IRT)
- Line: IRT Pelham Line
- Services: 6 (all times)
- Transit: NYCT Bus: Bx17, Bx33
- Structure: Underground
- Platforms: 2 side platforms
- Tracks: 3

Other information
- Opened: January 7, 1919; 107 years ago

Traffic
- 2025: 602,331 ▲0.9%
- Rank: 371 out of 423
Services
Preceding station	New York City Subway	Following station
East 143rd Street–St. Mary's Street toward Pelham Bay Park	Local	Brook Avenue toward Brooklyn Bridge–City Hall
does not stop here
Location
Location within New York City Subway
Location within New York City
Location within New York
Track layout
Street map
Station service legend
Symbol	Description
Stops all times	Stops all times

The Cypress Avenue station is a local station on the IRT Pelham Line of the New York City Subway. Located at the intersection of Cypress Avenue and East 138th Street in the Mott Haven and Port Morris neighborhoods of the Bronx, it is served by the 6 train at all times. The <6> train skips this station when it operates.

The station opened in 1919 as part of an extension of the Pelham Line of the Interborough Rapid Transit Company, and had its platforms extended in the 1960s.

== History ==
This station opened on January 7, 1919, as part of the extension of the Pelham Line from Third Avenue–138th Street to Hunts Point Avenue by the Interborough Rapid Transit Company as part of the Dual Contracts.

Both platforms were extended at either ends in the 1960s to accommodate the current standard length of an IRT train (514 feet (157 m)). The extensions are noticeable as they are narrower than the rest of the platforms, have no columns, and the trim line is green with "CYPRESS AVE" in white sans serif font. The extensions result in the platforms being slightly offset.

== Station layout ==
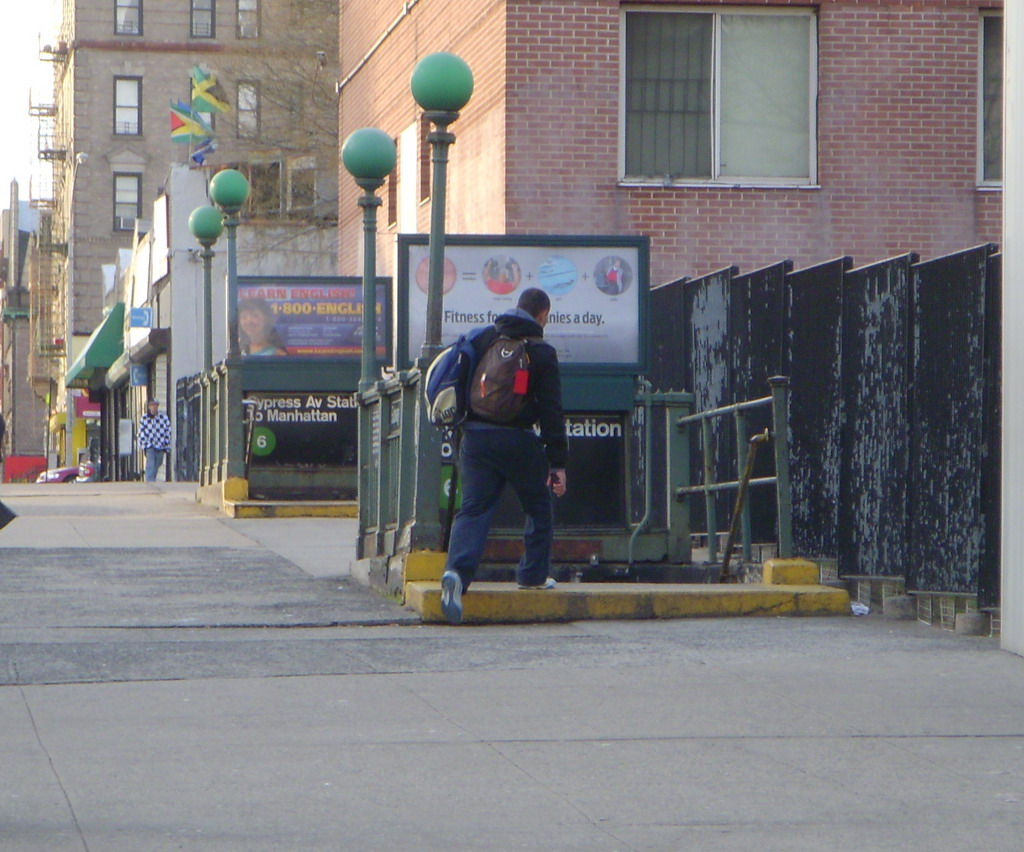
Southbound street stairs

This underground station has three tracks and two side platforms. The center express track is used by the weekday peak direction <6> service. The 6 local train serves the station at all times. The next stop to the south is Brook Avenue, while the next stop to the north is East 143rd Street–St. Mary's Street.

Both platforms have their original Dual Contracts mosaic trim line and name tablets. "C" tablets for "Cypress" run along the trim line at regular intervals and the name tablets have "CYPRESS AVE." in serif, all-caps lettering. Dark yellow i-beam columns run along the platforms at regular intervals with every other one having the standard black name plate with white lettering.

There are no crossovers or crossunders to allow free transfers between directions. There is a closed newsstand that has been tiled over. Only the northbound platform has a station agent booth.

=== Exits ===
Both platforms have one same-level fare control area at the east (railroad north) end. Each one has a turnstile bank, token booth, and two street stairs. The ones on the Pelham Bay Park-bound platform go up to the south side of East 138th Street between Cypress and Jackson Avenues while the ones on the Manhattan-bound platform go up to the north side.
