= North New York =

North New York may refer to:

- North Country, New York, a region of upstate New York
- North New York, Bronx, a former neighborhood of the Bronx, New York City
