= East 143rd Street–St. Mary's Street station =

New York City Subway station in the Bronx

East 143 Street–St. Mary's Street
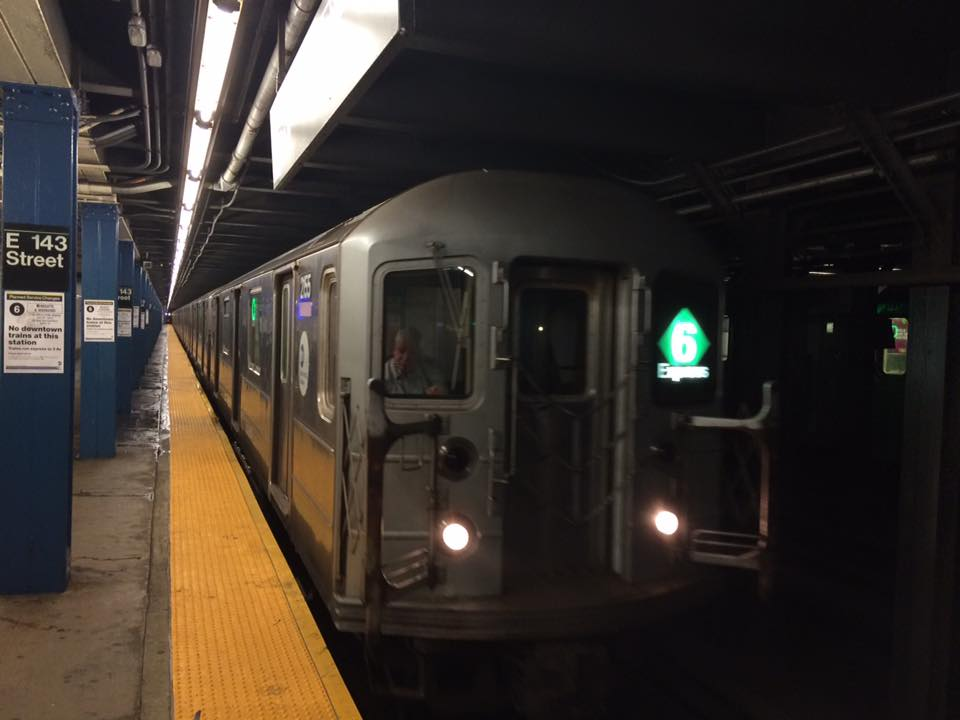
- A southbound R62A 6 express train at the station

Station statistics
- Address: East 143rd Street (St. Mary's Street) and Southern Boulevard; Bronx, New York
- Borough: The Bronx
- Locale: Mott Haven, Port Morris
- Coordinates: 40.808125°N 73.907862°W
- Division: A (IRT)
- Line: IRT Pelham Line
- Services: 6 (all times)
- Structure: Underground
- Platforms: 2 side platforms
- Tracks: 3

Other information
- Opened: January 7, 1919; 107 years ago
- Former/other names: East 143rd Street

Traffic
- 2025: 413,656 ▲58.7%
- Rank: 404 out of 423
Services
Preceding station	New York City Subway	Following station
East 149th Street toward Pelham Bay Park	Local	Cypress Avenue toward Brooklyn Bridge–City Hall
does not stop here
Location
Location within New York City Subway
Location within New York City
Location within New York
Track layout
Street map
Station service legend
Symbol	Description
Stops all times	Stops all times

The East 143rd Street–St. Mary's Street station is a local station on the IRT Pelham Line of the New York City Subway. Located at the intersection of East 143rd Street (also known as St. Mary's Street) and Southern Boulevard in the Mott Haven and Port Morris neighborhoods of the Bronx, it is served by the 6 train at all times. The <6> train skips this station when it operates.

The station opened in 1919 as part of an extension of the Pelham Line of the Interborough Rapid Transit Company, and had its platforms extended in the 1960s.

== History ==
This station opened on January 7, 1919, as part of an extension of the Pelham Line from Third Avenue–138th Street to Hunts Point Avenue by the Interborough Rapid Transit Company (IRT).

Both platforms were extended at the east (railroad north) end in the 1960s to accommodate the current standard length of an IRT train (514 feet (157 m)). The extensions are noticeable as they are narrower than the rest of the platforms, have no columns, and the trim line is blue with "E 143RD ST" in white sans serif font. They also resulted in the platforms being slightly offset.

== Station layout ==
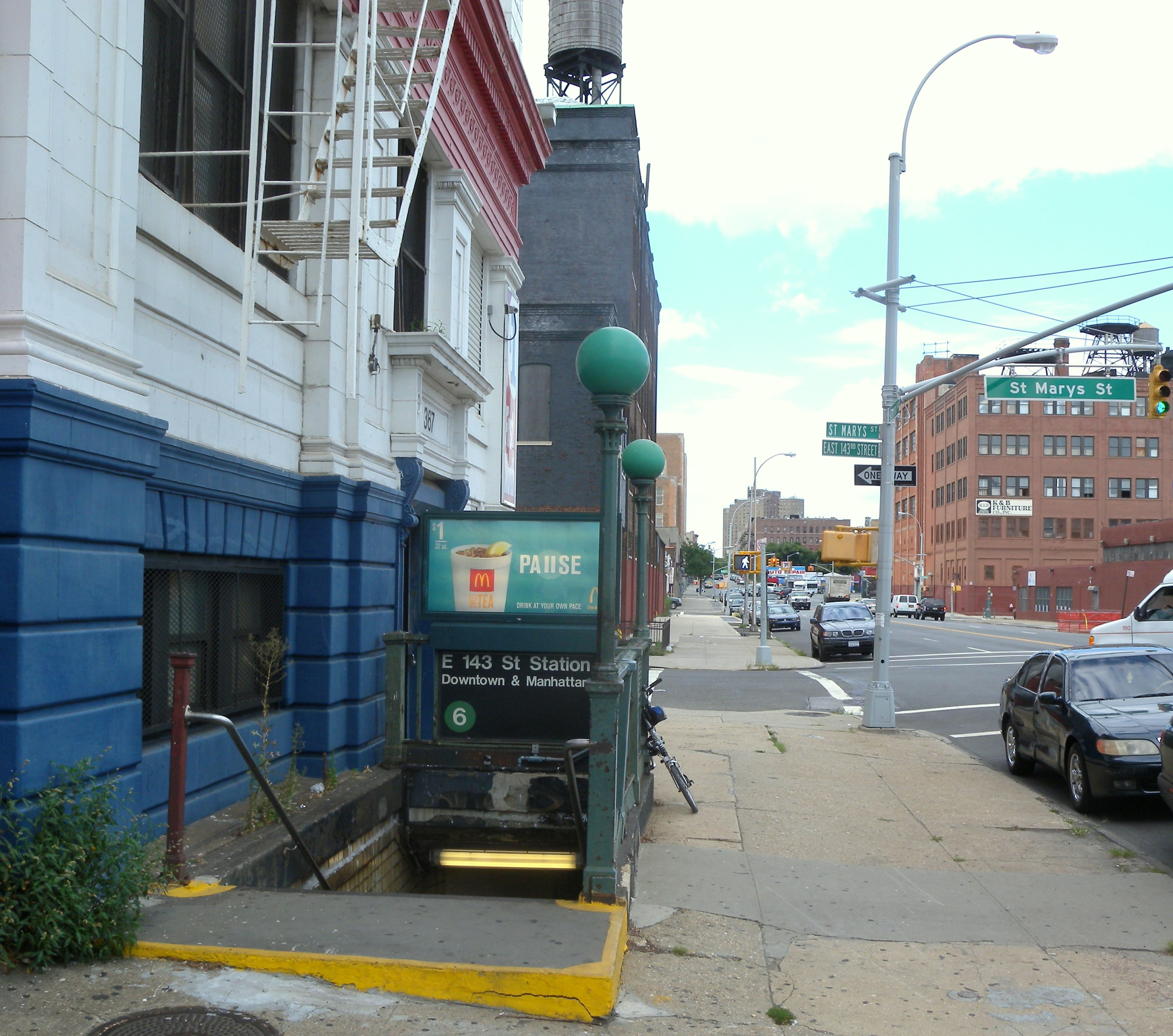
Southbound street stair

This underground station has three tracks and two side platforms. The center express track is used by the weekday peak direction <6> service. The 6 local train serves the station at all times. The next stop to the south is Cypress Avenue, while the next stop to the north is East 149th Street.

Both platforms have their original Dual Contracts mosaic trim line and name tablets. "143" tablets for "East 143rd Street" run along the trim line at regular intervals and the name tablets have "E. 143RD STREET" in all-caps, serif lettering. Dark blue i-beam columns run along the platforms at regular intervals with every other one having the standard black name plate with white lettering.

There are no crossovers or crossunders to allow free transfers between directions. There is a closed newsstand that has been tiled over.

By passenger count, it is the least-used station in the Bronx, and the least-used IRT station citywide.

=== Exits ===
Both platforms have one same-level fare control area at the south (geographical west) end. Each one has a turnstile bank, token booth, and two street stairs. The ones on the Pelham Bay Park-bound platform go up to the either southern corners of the T-intersection of Southern Boulevard and East 143rd Street while the ones on the Manhattan-bound platform go up to either northern corners.
