= Strive Charter School =

Charter school in New York City

Coordinates: 40.8066°N 73.9154°W

Strive Charter School opened in Mott Haven, Bronx in August 2026, serving students in kindergarten through 4th grade. It is the first among charter schools in the United States to be open 7am to 7pm for seven days a week all 12 months per year. Class is in session five days a week 9am to 4:30pm September to late June, and school activity outside the class schedule is optional and free of charge. The expansive operating hours are intended to help working parents who struggle to find affordable childcare outside normal school hours. It was founded by Eric Grannis with help from his wife, Eva Moskowitz, co-founder and CEO of New York City’s largest charter-school network, Success Academy. Strive Charter School operates in a building owned by St. Luke's Catholic Church. Principal Shaniqua Sonnee was previously the director of enrichment at Hunter College Elementary School.

The school expects to enroll 325 students in its first year, eventually enrolling over 500 students in the future.
