= Brook Avenue station =

New York City Subway station in the Bronx

Brook Avenue
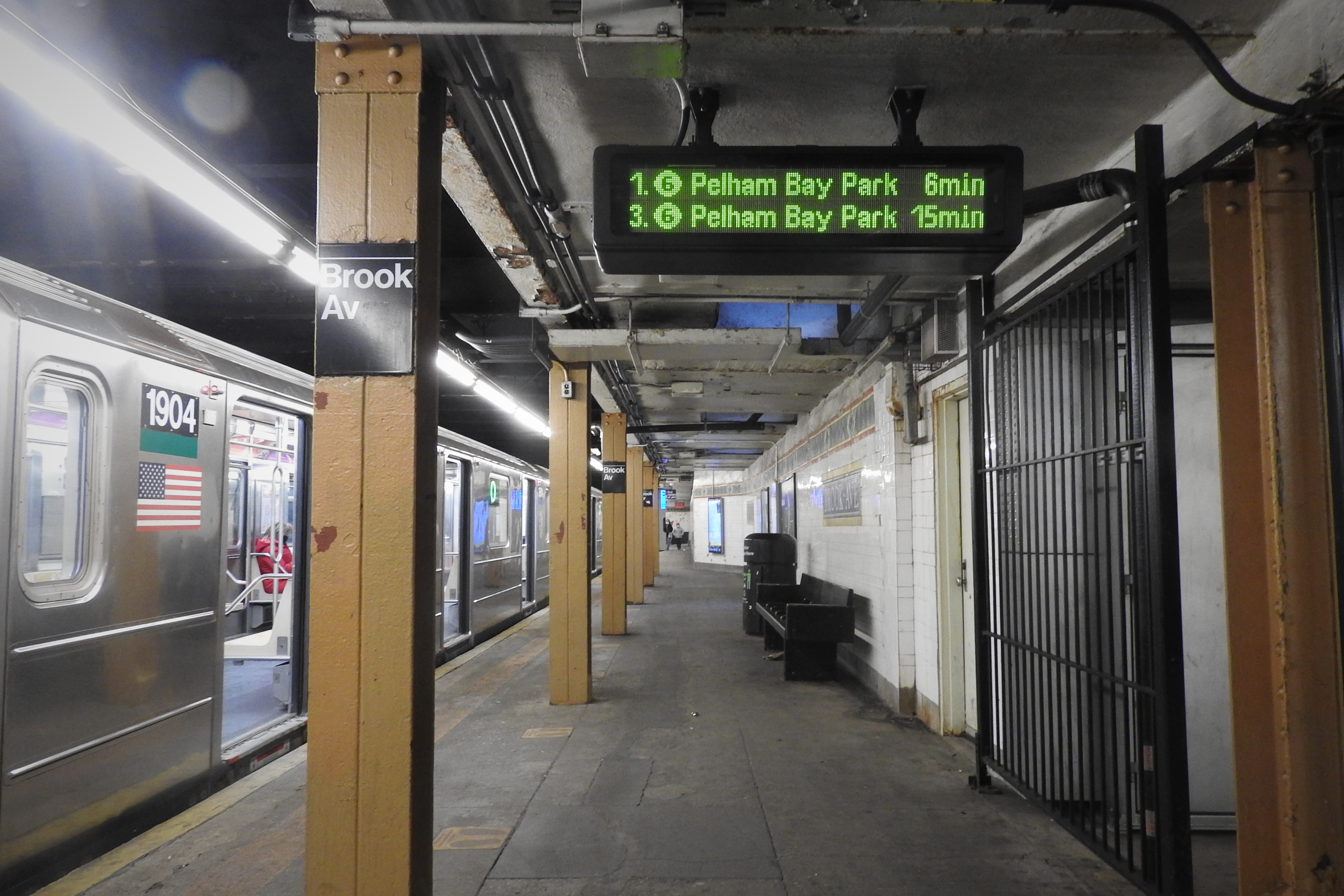
- Northbound R62A 6 train at the station

Station statistics
- Address: Brook Avenue and East 138th Street; Bronx, New York
- Borough: The Bronx
- Locale: Mott Haven
- Coordinates: 40.80754°N 73.91932°W
- Division: A (IRT)
- Line: IRT Pelham Line
- Services: 6 (all times)
- Transit: NYCT Bus: Bx33
- Structure: Underground
- Platforms: 2 side platforms
- Tracks: 3

Other information
- Opened: January 7, 1919; 107 years ago
- Accessible: No; under construction

Traffic
- 2025: 1,090,236 ▲2.5%
- Rank: 295 out of 423
Services
| Preceding station | New York City Subway | Following station |
|---|---|---|
| Cypress Avenue toward Pelham Bay Park | Local | Third Avenue–138th Street toward Brooklyn Bridge–City Hall |
does not stop here
Location
Location within New York City Subway
Location within New York City
Location within New York
Track layout
Street map
Station service legend
| Symbol | Description |
| Stops all times | Stops all times |

The Brook Avenue station is a local station on the IRT Pelham Line of the New York City Subway. Located at Brook Avenue and East 138th Street in the Mott Haven neighborhood of the Bronx, it is served by the 6 train at all times. The <6> train skips this station when it operates.

The station opened in 1919 as part of an extension of the Pelham Line of the Interborough Rapid Transit Company, and had its platforms extended in the 1960s. The station is slated to undergo renovations to become compliant with the Americans with Disabilities Act of 1990.

== History ==
This station opened on January 7, 1919 with the extension of the Pelham Line from Third Avenue–138th Street to Hunts Point Avenue by the Interborough Rapid Transit Company.

In 1951, the MTA proposed building a transfer from the IRT Pelham Line to the IND Second Avenue Line at Brook Avenue, though that was never built. Instead, both platforms were extended at either ends in the 1960s to accommodate the current standard length of an IRT train (510 feet (160 m)). The extensions are noticeable as they are narrower than the rest of the platforms and have no columns. The extensions result in the platforms being slightly offset.

In 1981, the MTA listed the station among the 69 most deteriorated stations in the subway system. Under the 2015–2019 MTA Capital Plan, the station, along with thirty other New York City Subway stations, will undergo a complete overhaul and would be entirely closed for up to 6 months. Updates would include cellular service, Wi-Fi, charging stations, improved signage, and improved station lighting. However, these renovations are being deferred until the 2020–2024 Capital Program due to a lack of funding. In 2019, the MTA announced that this station would become ADA-accessible as part of the agency's 2020–2024 Capital Program. The renovation of the station was to be funded by congestion pricing in New York City, but the renovation was postponed in June 2024 after the implementation of congestion pricing was delayed. However, after congestion pricing was approved, the MTA announced that the elevator installations would proceed.

== Station layout ==
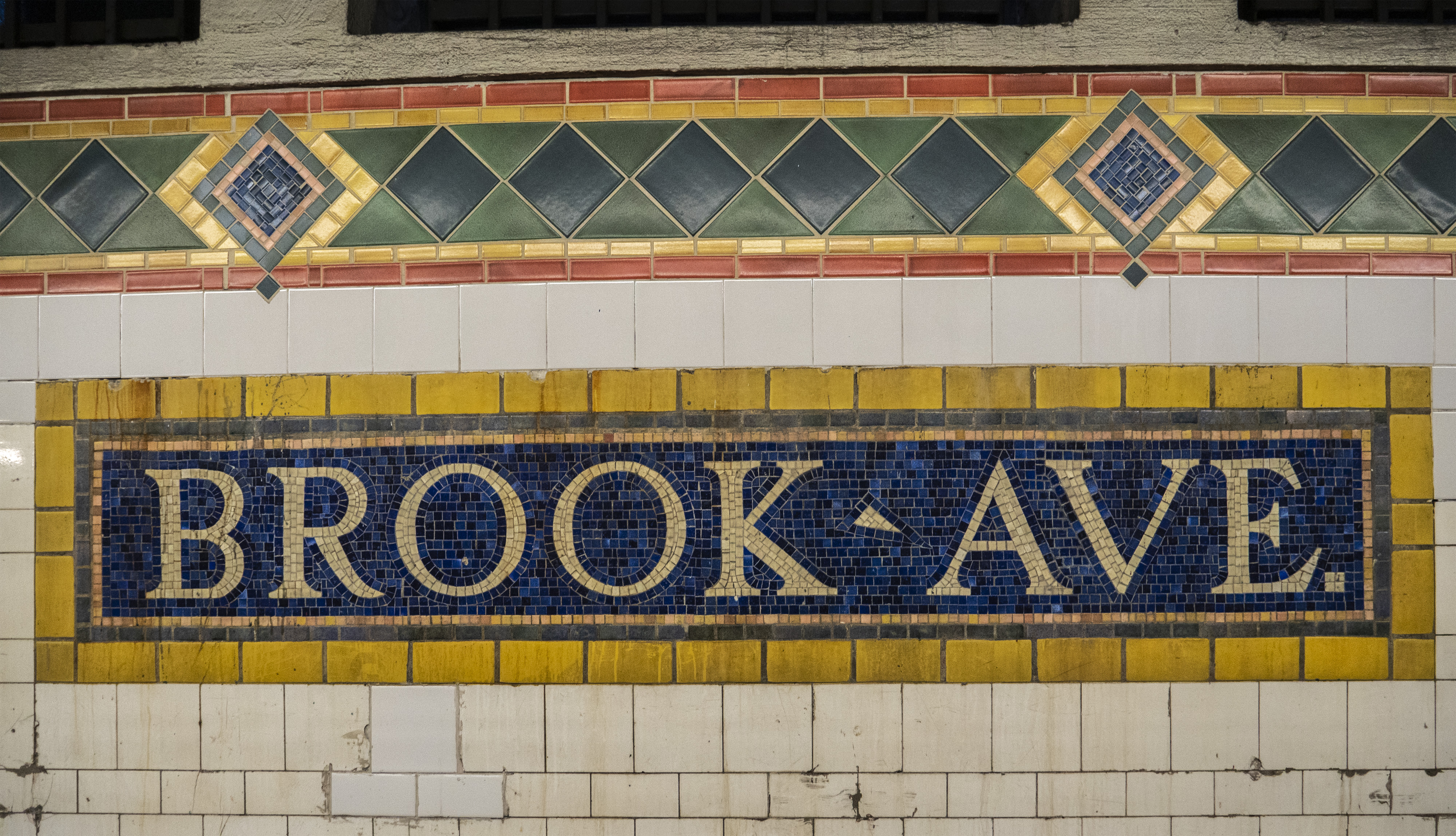
Mosaic name tablet and trim

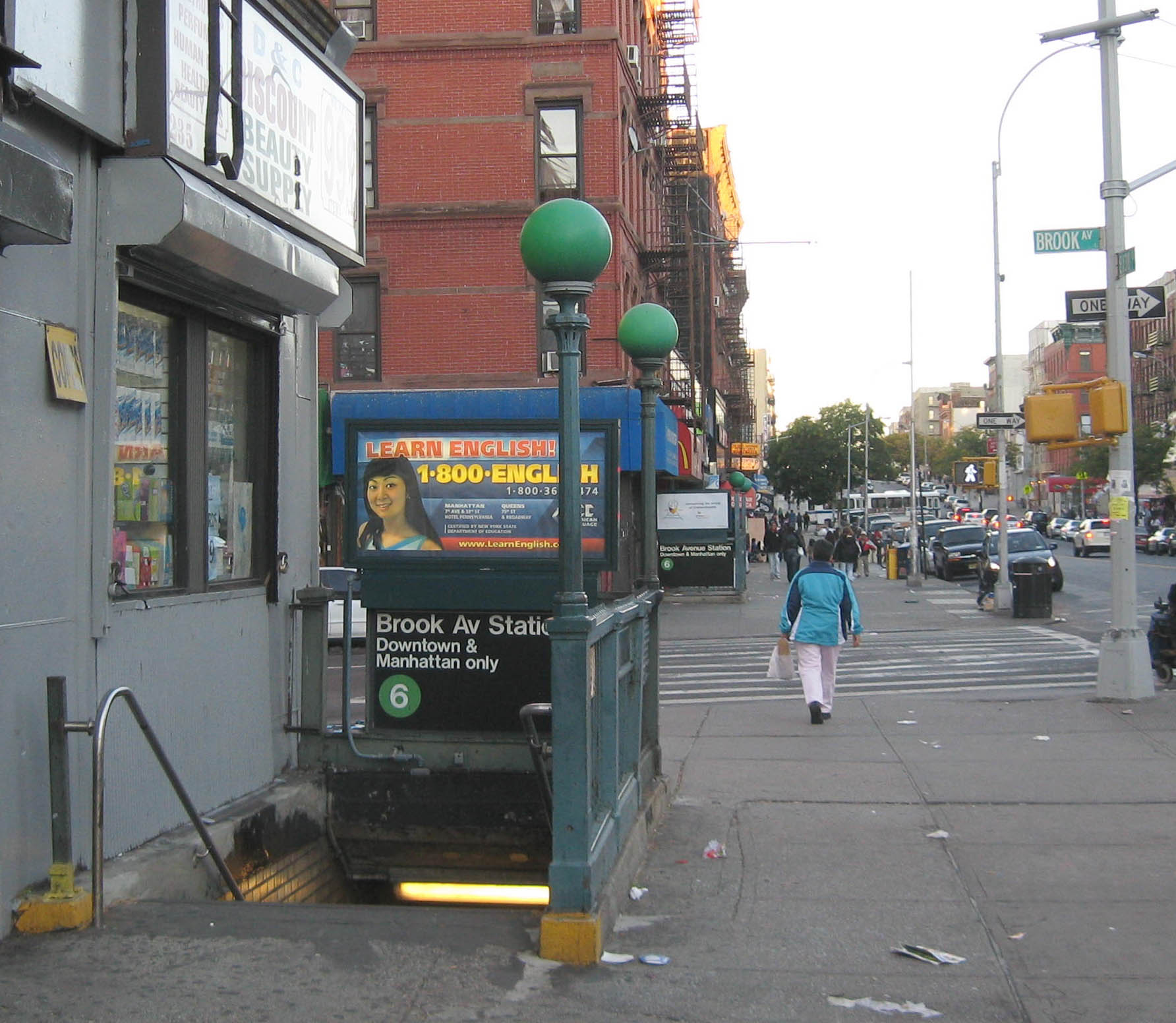
Southbound street stair

This underground station has three tracks and two side platforms. The center express track is used by the weekday peak direction <6> service. The 6 local train serves the station at all times. The next stop to the south is Third Avenue–138th Street, while the next stop to the north is Cypress Avenue.

Both platforms have their original Dual Contracts mosaic trim line and name tablets. The trim line has a geometric Vickers design of brightly colored diamonds in blue and green, bordered by scarlet red and yellow-ochre bands, as well as alternating "B" and concentric diamond plaques at regular intervals. The name tablets read "BROOK AVE." in white seriffed lettering on a blue background and yellow-ochre border. Some of the tablets themselves, and sections of the trim line on both sides have been replaced in recent years with historically accurate replicas. Dark yellow I-beam columns run along the original portion of the platforms at regular intervals, alternating ones having the standard black name plate with white lettering.

There are no crossovers or crossunders to allow free transfers between directions.

=== Exits ===
Both platforms have one same-level fare control area at the center. Each one has a turnstile bank, token booth, and two street stairs. The ones on the Pelham Bay Park-bound platform go up to either southern corners of Brook Avenue and East 138th Street while the ones on the Manhattan-bound platform go up to either northern corners.
