= Southern Boulevard (Bronx) =

Boulevard in the Bronx, New York

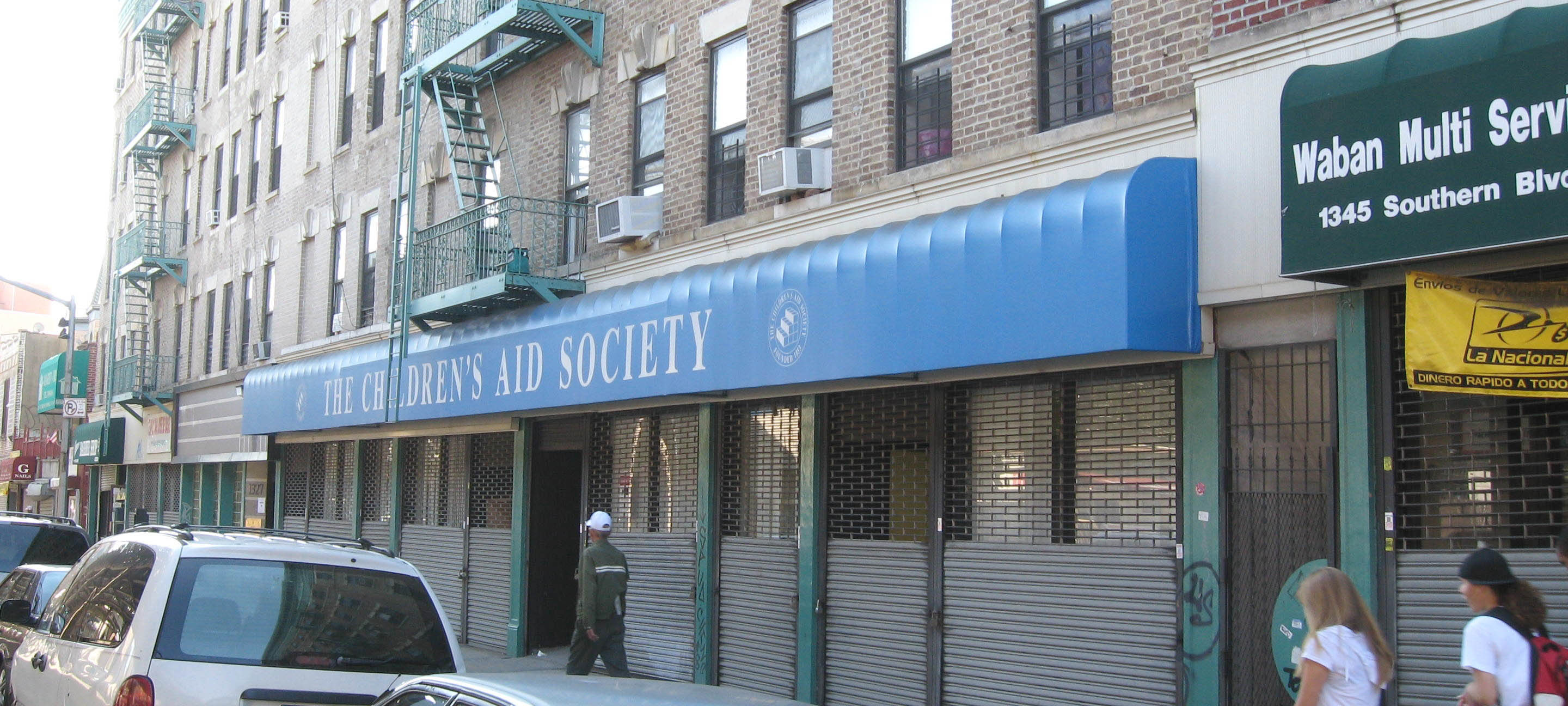
- Looking southwest on the street in Crotona Park East
- Former name: Dr. Theodore L. Kazimiroff Boulevard
- Owner: City of New York
- Maintained by: NYCDOT
- Length: 5.53 mi (8.90 km)
- Location: Bronx, New York City
- Nearest metro station: IRT White Plains Road Line, IRT Pelham Line
- Coordinates: 40.85226°N 73.88198°W
- South end: Bruckner Boulevard in Mott Haven
- Major junctions: US 1 in Belmont; Mosholu Parkway in Bedford Park
- North end: Bronx River Parkway / Bronx Park East / Allerton Avenue in Bronx Park

Southern Boulevard is a street in the Bronx, New York City, United States. It stretches from Bruckner Boulevard in Mott Haven to Bronx Park East in Bronx Park where it becomes Allerton Avenue.

== History ==
From 1981 until 2011, the portion north of Fordham Road, adjacent to the New York Botanical Garden, was also named Dr. Theodore L. Kazimiroff Boulevard. In 2011, the name of Kazimiroff, a Bronx historian and a founder of The Bronx County Historical Society, was changed to an honorary designation for this portion of Southern Boulevard after the New York City Department of Transportation, having been lobbied by Fordham University, decided that the designation was little known and confusing to those unfamiliar with the area.

== Transportation ==
Southern Boulevard is served by the following subway lines:

- The 2 and 5 trains run directly above Southern Boulevard from Simpson Street to 174th Street.
- The 6 and <6> trains run under Southern Boulevard from East 143rd Street to Hunts Point Avenue.

And these bus routes serve the corridor:

- The Bx19 is Southern Boulevard’s main route. It serves in both directions between the East 149th Street station and the New York Botanical Garden, using Xavier Way to head back south.
- The Bx9 runs between East 180th Street and East Fordham Road.
- The Bx5 runs between Westchester Avenue and either Hunts Point Avenue (Pelham Bay) or East 163rd Street (West Farms).
- The Bx25 and Bx26 serve the corridor north of Bedford Park Boulevard.

== See also ==
- Southern Boulevard Railroad
