= Mott Haven, Bronx =

Neighborhood in New York City

Mott Haven
- Neighborhood of the Bronx
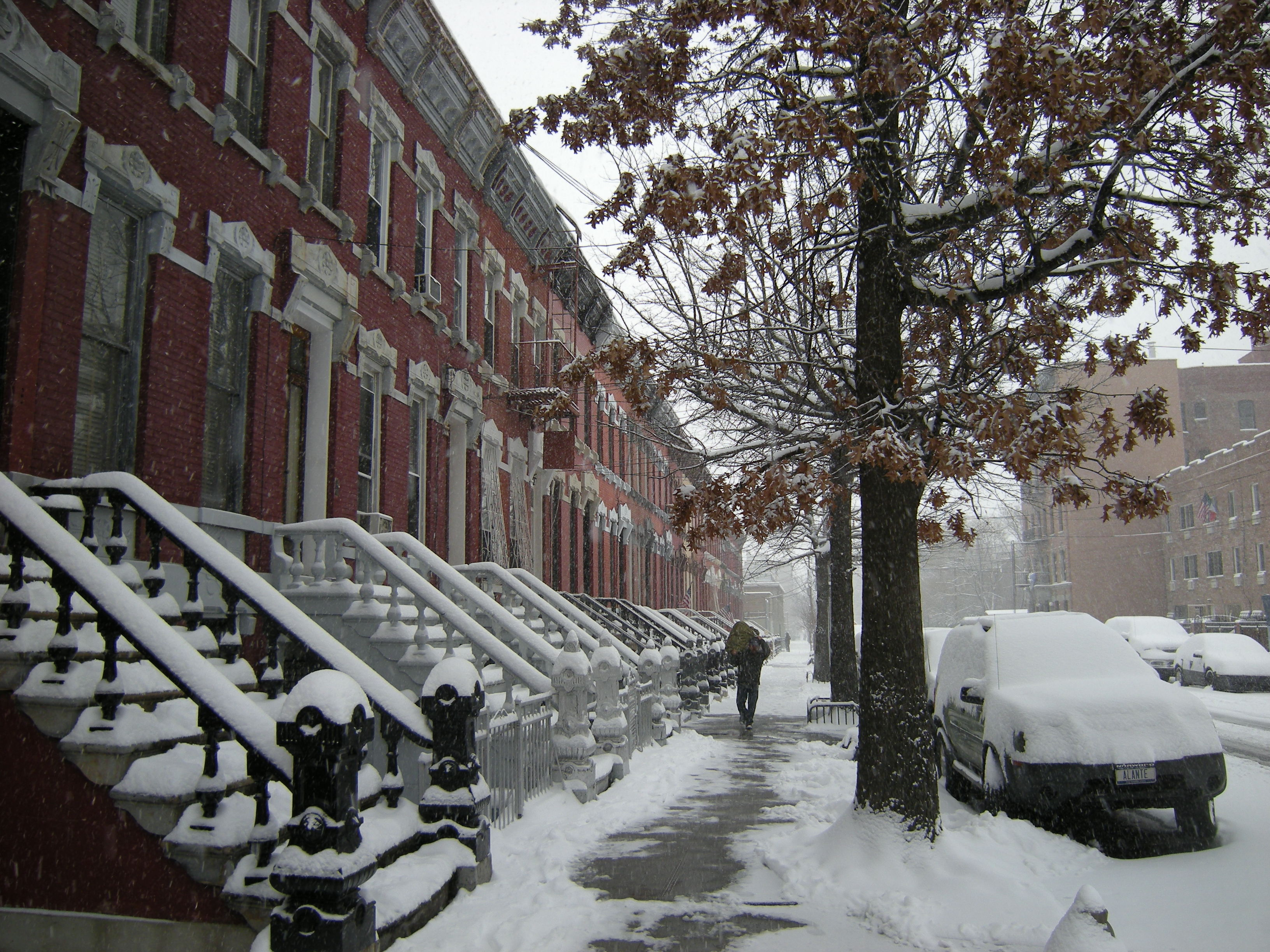
- East 139th Street, between Willis and Brook Avenues, facing east
- Nickname: "The Boogie Down Bronx"
- Location in New York City
- Coordinates: 40.81°N 73.926°W
- Country: United States
- State: New York
- City: New York City
- Borough: The Bronx
- Community District: Bronx 1
- Founded: 1849
- Named for: Jordan Lawrence Mott

Area
  - Total: 1.180 sq mi (3.06 km^{2})

Population (2020)
  - Total: 54,163
  - Density: 45,900/sq mi (17,720/km^{2})

Economics
  - Median income: $25,325

Ethnicity
  - Hispanic: 68.8%
  - Black: 28%
  - White: 1.9%
  - Asian: 0.4%
  - Other: 0.9%
- ZIP Codes: 10451, 10454, 10455
- Area codes: 718, 347, 929, and 917
- Website: www.motthaven.nyc
- Mott Haven Historic District
- U.S. National Register of Historic Places
- U.S. Historic district
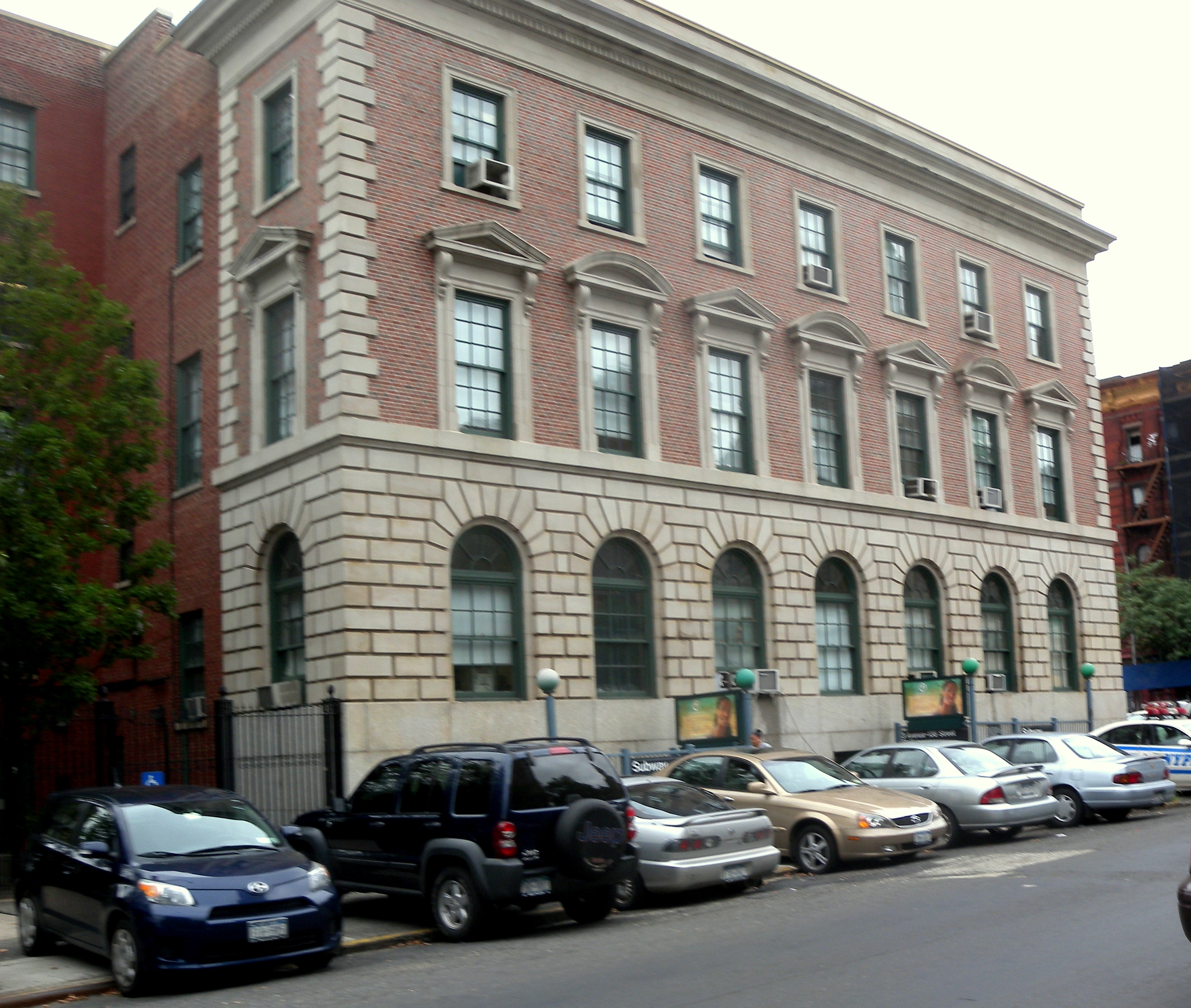
- 40th Precinct Police Station, July 2010
- Location: An irregular pattern along Alexander Ave. and E. 138th St., New York, New York
- Area: 11 acres (4.5 ha)
- Built: 1850
- Architect: Multiple
- Architectural style: Gothic, Queen Anne, Romanesque
- NRHP reference No.: 80002586
- Added to NRHP: March 25, 1980

Mott Haven is a primarily residential neighborhood in the southwestern section of the New York City borough of the Bronx. It is generally bounded by East 149th Street to the north, the Bruckner Expressway to the east and south, and the Harlem River to the west, although these boundaries are not precise. East 138th Street is the primary east–west thoroughfare through Mott Haven.

The neighborhood is part of Bronx Community Board 1, and is located within ZIP Codes 10451, 10454, and 10455. Mott Haven is patrolled by the New York City Police Department's 40th Precinct.

The local subway line is the IRT Pelham Line (6 and <6> trains), operating along East 138th Street. The local buses are the Bx1, Bx2, Bx17, Bx19, Bx21, Bx32, Bx33, M125. Mott Haven is served by the Triborough Bridge, the Third Avenue Bridge, the Madison Avenue Bridge, the 145th Street Bridge, and the Willis Avenue Bridge. The closest Metro-North Railroad stops are Harlem – 125th Street and Yankees – East 153rd Street.

== History ==
=== Settlement by Jonas Bronck ===
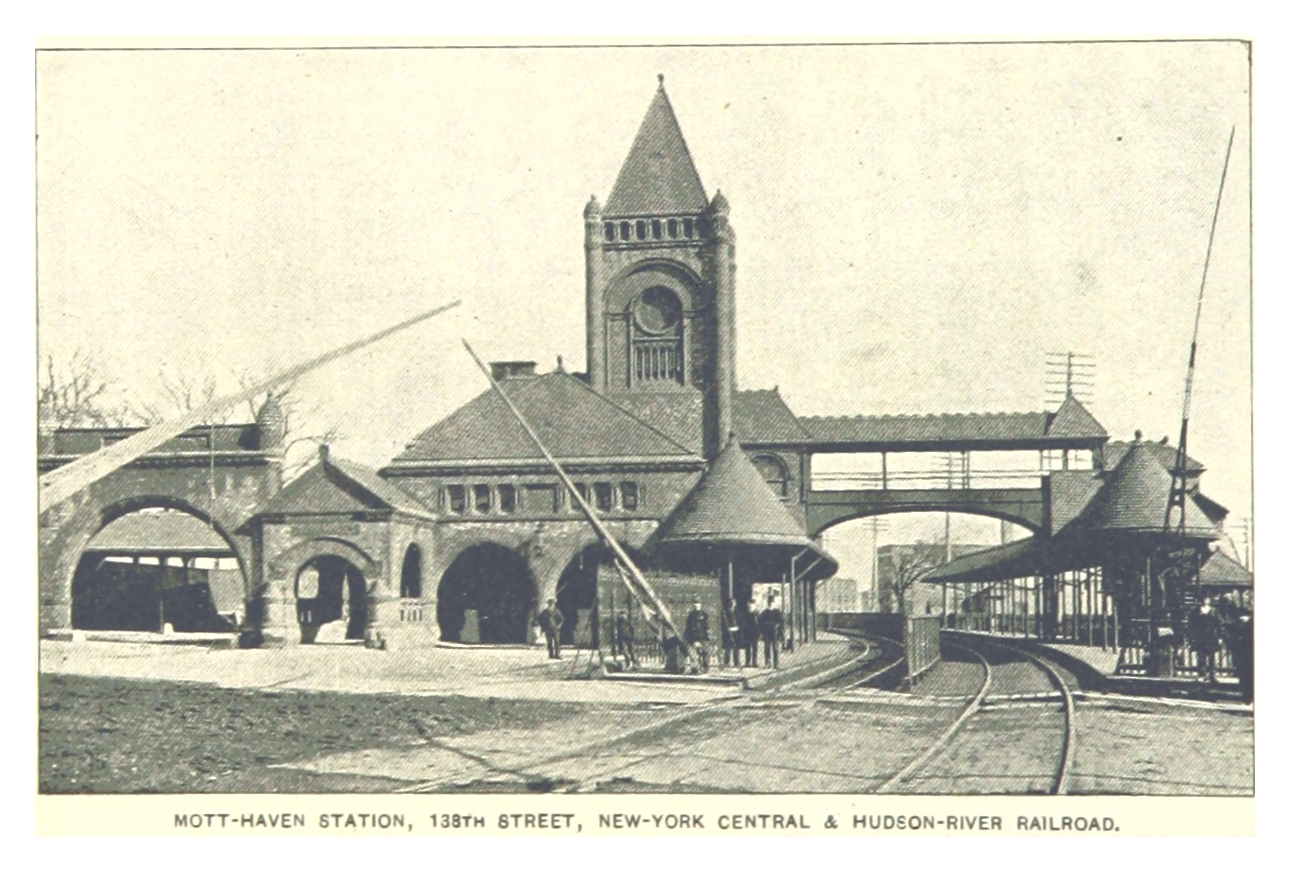
Mott Haven station of New York Central, 138th St

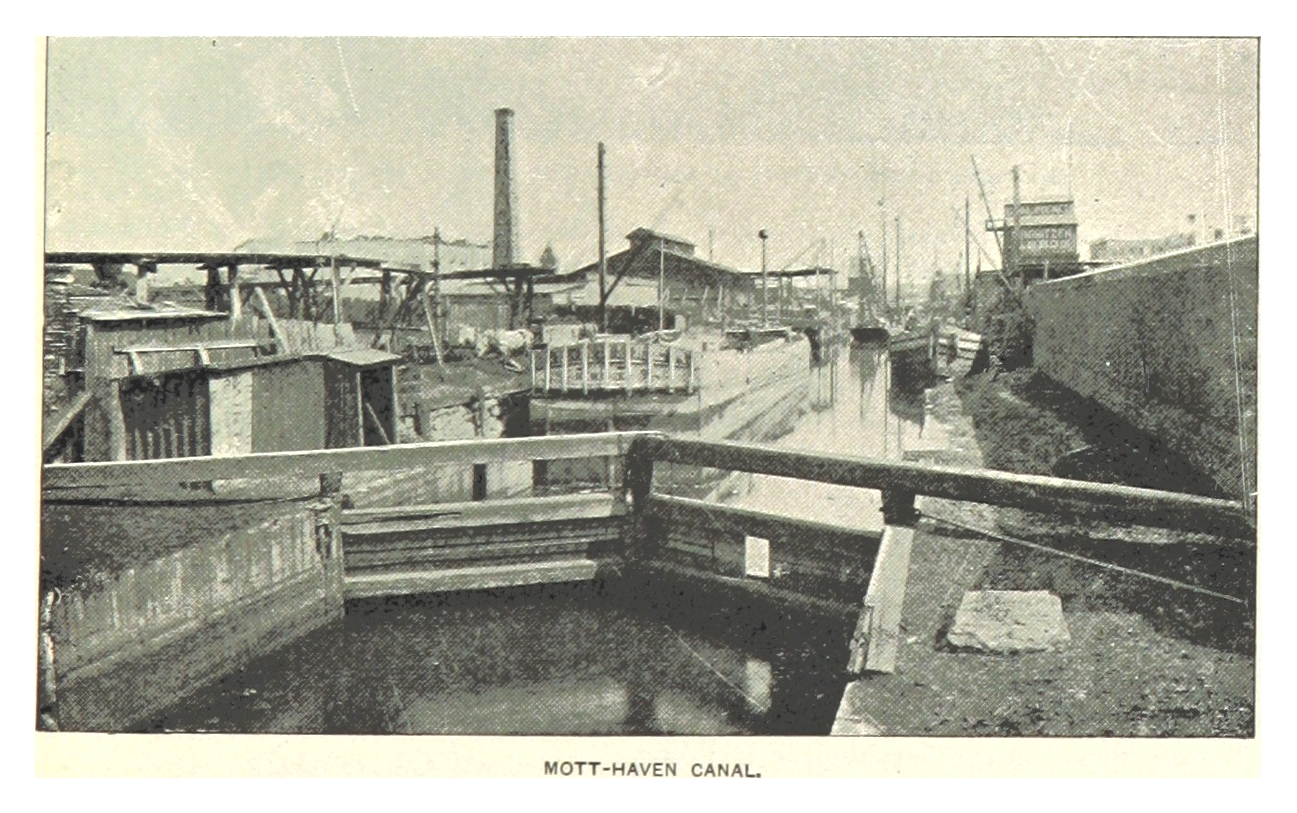
Mott Haven Canal in 1893

The Bronx was named after the Swedish sea captain Jonas Bronck. In 1639, the Dutch West India Company purchased the land of today's Mott Haven from the Wecquaesgeek (groups of Lenape tribe). Bronck built his farm on this land and named it "Emmanus". The house was located close to what is today the corner of Willis Avenue and 132nd Street. The peace treaty between Dutch authorities and the Wecquaesgeek chiefs Ranaqua and Tackamuckwas was signed in Bronck's house. This event is portrayed in a painting by the American artist John Ward Dunsmore (1856–1945).

Even though Bronck only lived in the area for four years, the land became known as "Broncksland" and the river that bordered his land kept the name Bronck's River. The first time the spelling "Bronx land" was used, was in 1697 in the First Legislature outlined the County of West Chester.

=== Development ===
The area that is now called Mott Haven was sold to the Morris family in 1670. A small part of the larger swath of land known as Morrisania, it was purchased by Jordan Lawrence Mott for his iron works in 1849. A vestige of the iron works can be seen just west of the Third Avenue Bridge on East 134th Street. St. Ann's Church (ECUSA) on St. Ann's Avenue is the resting place of Lewis Morris, Gouverneur Morris and other members of that powerful colonial family, and a Registered Historic Place.

As the city below grew, the area quickly developed residentially. At the same time, an upper-middle class residential area, marked by brownstones built in an elaborate and architecturally daring fashion, started to grow along Alexander Avenue by the 1890s (Doctors' Row, aka the Irish Fifth Avenue). A series of brownstones on East 134th Street, east of Willis Avenue., was known as Judges' Row. Soon after, the Bronx grew more quickly, especially with public transit into the area, including the Third Avenue Elevated Line. By the early 20th century, the population density of the area supported the construction of many tenement-style apartment buildings.

From the end of the 19th century through the 1940s, Mott Haven was a mixed German-American (north of East 145th Street) and Irish-American neighborhood (south of East 145th Street), with an Italian enclave west of Lincoln Ave. The first Puerto Rican settlements came in the late 1940s along the length of Brook Avenue. African-Americans came into the area when the Patterson Houses were built.

One of the largest parades in New York City took place here in the late 1940s and early 1950s. It was organized by the veterans of the Irish Republican Army, who marched every Easter Sunday, down Willis Avenue from the Hub to East 138th Street, then west to St. Jerome's. The Star of Munster Ballroom at the northeast corner of Willis Avenue and East 138th Street was a center of Irish music for decades. It was speculated at one time that there were more bars on Willis Avenue than on any other city street, given its short length. More recorded Irish musicians lived in Mott Haven than in any place outside Ireland.

=== "South Bronx" and late-20th century ===
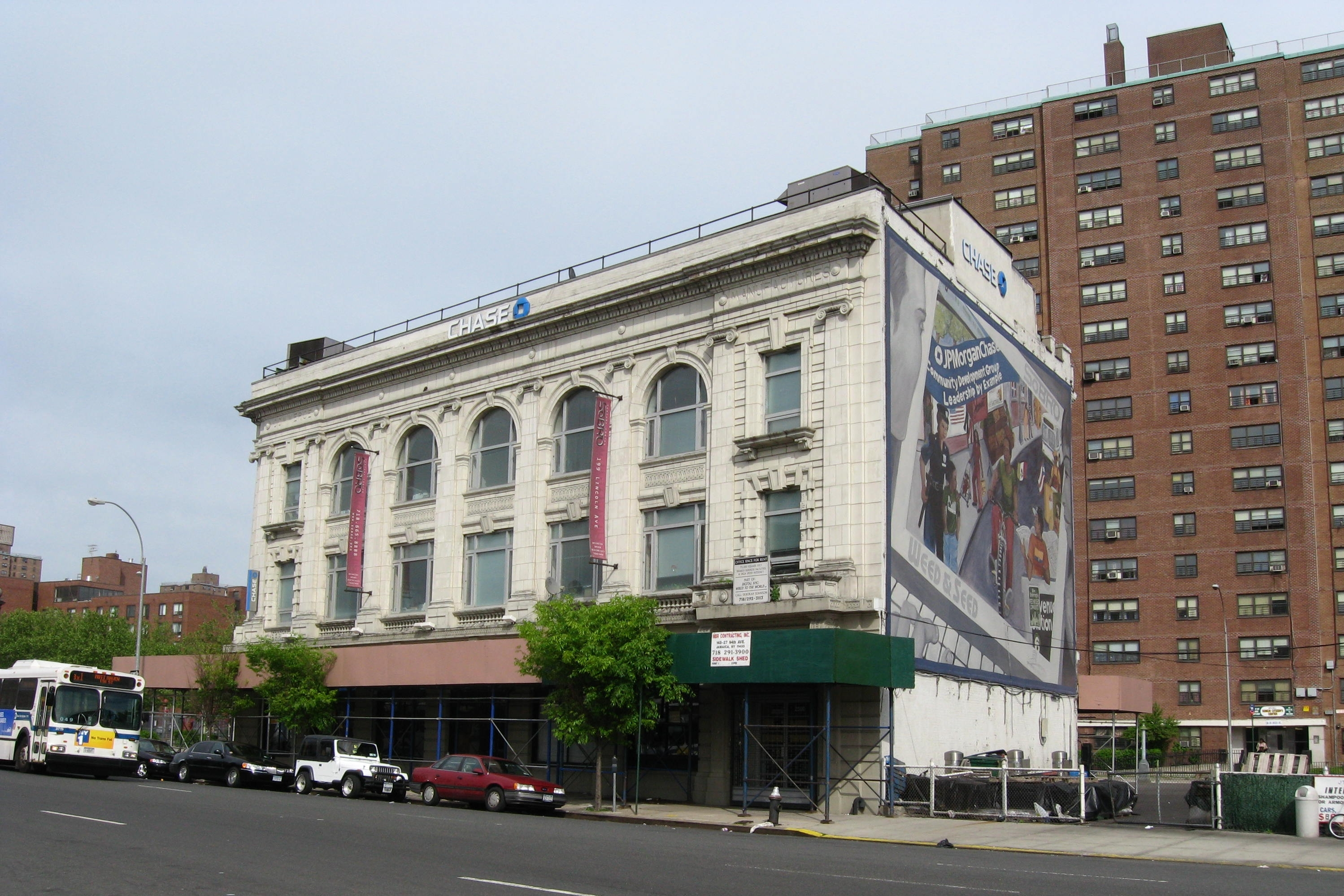
North Side Board of Trade

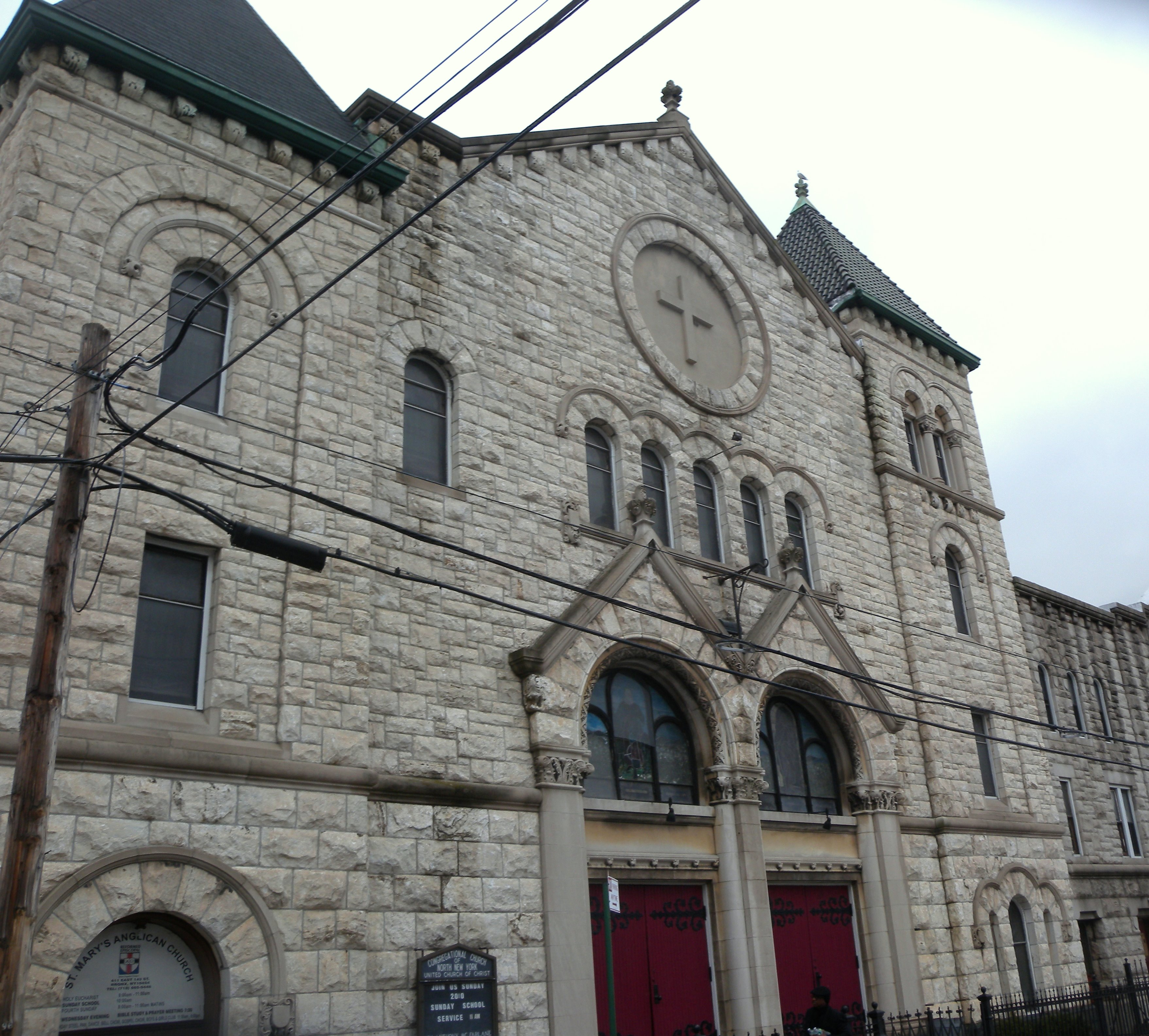
North New York Congregationalist Church

Mott Haven and Port Morris were the first neighborhoods to give rise to the term "South Bronx". Together, they were earlier known as the North Side or North New York. This area was part of New York City after the incorporation of Greater New York in 1898. The Chase Manhattan Bank at Third Avenue and East 137th Street was originally the North Side Board of Trade Building (1912). It later became the North Side Savings Bank, which became the Dollar Dry Dock Savings Bank, which became Chase.

In the 1940s when the Bronx was usually divided into the East Bronx and West Bronx, a group of social workers identified a pocket of poverty on East 134th Street, east of Brown Place, and called it the South Bronx. This area of poverty would spread in part due to an illegal practice known as blockbusting and to Robert Moses building several housing projects in the neighborhood. The poverty greatly expanded northward, following the post-war phenomenon colloquially referred to as white flight, reaching a peak in the 1960s when the socioeconomic North Bronx-South Bronx boundary reached Fordham Road. At this time a wave of arson destroyed or damaged many of the residential, commercial, and industrial structures in the area.

During the course of Mott Haven's growth, the communities of Wilton and North New York were incorporated into it. Later attempts to market Mott Haven as the "Piano District" and the South Bronx as "SoBro" have not found traction.

=== Redevelopment ===
There has been a significant wave of residential redevelopment and gentrification in the neighborhood especially along East 138th Street corridor with developments such as "The Joinery", the first luxury mid-rise condominium in the area, in addition to recently built affordable housing such as "Borinquen Court" and "Tres Puentes" apartment complex. Mott Haven is home to a community-supported agriculture program hosted at Brook Park. Recent development plans include two affordable rental buildings, a Hampton Inn by Monadnock Development and Signature Urban Properties, and the so-called Piano District.

== Demographics ==
Mott Haven is a high-density and mainly low-income neighborhood. Like most neighborhoods in New York City, the vast majority of households are renter-occupied. The neighborhood is largely Puerto Rican, with smaller numbers of African Americans, Mexicans and Dominicans present.

Based on data from the 2010 United States census, the population of Mott Haven and Port Morris was 52,413, a change of 3,383 (6.5%) from the 49,030 counted in 2000. Covering an area of 951.01 acres (384.86 ha), the neighborhood had a population density of 55.1 inhabitants per acre (35,300/sq mi; 13,600/km^{2}).

The racial makeup of the neighborhood was 1.7% (867) White, 24.7% (12,927) African American, 0.2% (95) Native American, 0.4% (214) Asian, 0% (7) Pacific Islander, 0.2% (124) from other races, and 0.6% (310) from two or more races. Hispanic or Latino of any race were 72.3% (37,869) of the population.

The entirety of Community District 1, which comprises Mott Haven and Melrose, had 98,403 inhabitants as of NYC Health's 2018 Community Health Profile, with an average life expectancy of 77.6 years. This is lower than the median life expectancy of 81.2 for all New York City neighborhoods. Most inhabitants are youth and middle-aged adults: 28% are between the ages of between 0–17, 28% between 25 and 44, and 21% between 45 and 64. The ratio of college-aged and elderly residents was lower, at 12% and 10%, respectively.

As of 2017, the median household income in Community Districts 1 and 2, including Longwood, was $20,966. In 2018, an estimated 29% of Mott Haven and Melrose residents lived in poverty, compared to 25% in all of the Bronx and 20% in all of New York City. One in eight residents (12%) were unemployed, compared to 13% in the Bronx and 9% in New York City. Rent burden, or the percentage of residents who have difficulty paying their rent, is 58% in Mott Haven and Melrose, compared to the boroughwide and citywide rates of 58% and 51%, respectively. Based on this calculation, as of 2018, Mott Haven and Melrose were considered to be low-income relative to the rest of the city and not gentrifying.

== Land use and terrain ==
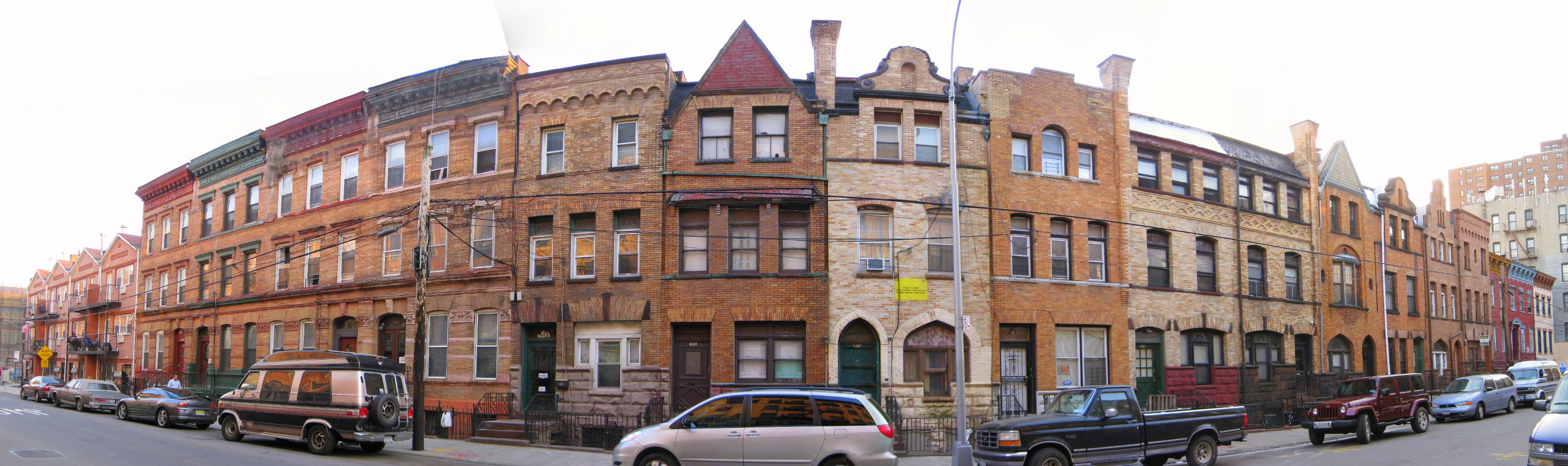
Bertine Block – 136th Street

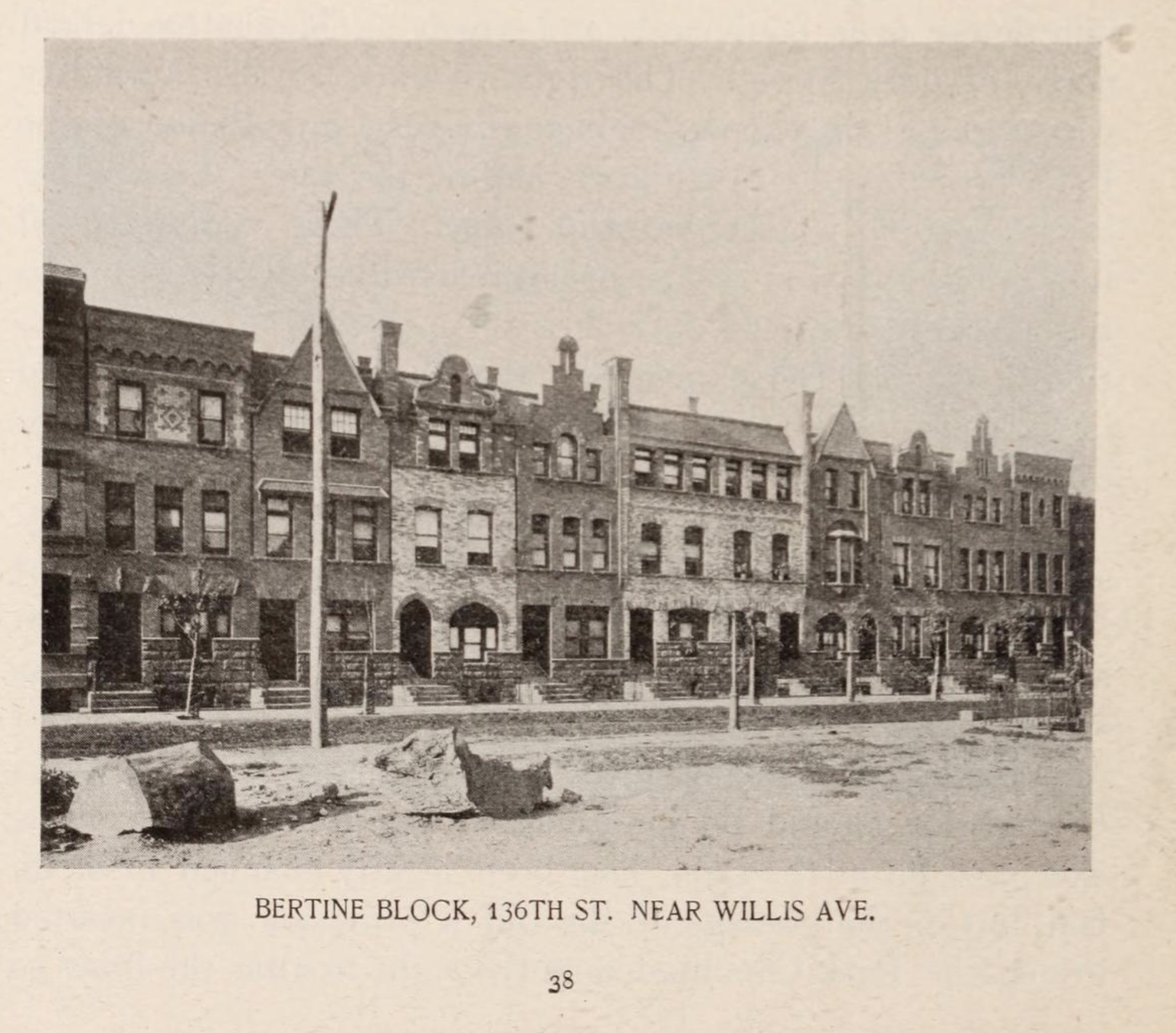
The same block, circa 1890

Mott Haven is dominated by tenement-style apartment buildings and large public-housing complexes. There are three historical districts consisting of brownstone-style rowhouses. In the last two decades, construction of modern two- and three-unit rowhouses and apartment buildings has increased the percentage of owner-occupiers. The neighborhood contains one of the highest concentrations of New York City Housing Authority (NYCHA) projects in the Bronx. The total land area is roughly one square mile. The terrain is low-lying and flat except around St. Mary's Park, where it is somewhat hilly.

=== Historical districts and landmarks ===
Three Historic Districts are located in Mott Haven: Mott Haven, Mott Haven East and the Bertine Block.

- The Mott Haven Historic District is located on Alexander Avenue between East 138th and East 141st Streets. The district is primarily residential in character with four- and five-story row houses dating to the last half of the 19th century, and contains the row of brownstones known historically as Doctors' Row and Irish Fifth Avenue. It also has the 40th Precinct police station, the 1905 neo-renaissance Mott Haven Branch of the New York Public Library, and Saint Jerome's Roman Catholic Church. It was listed on the National Register of Historic Places in 1980.
- The Mott Haven East Historic District is located on East 139th and East 140th Streets between Brook and Willis Avenues. The district contains rows of brownstones, designed by William O'Gorman and William Hornum in 1883, combining Dutch and Flemish architectural aspects on the north side of East 140th Street and neo-Grecian aspects on the south side of East 140th and on East 139th Streets.
- The Bertine Block Historic District is located on East 136th Street between Brook and Willis Avenues. The district contains yellow-faced brick brownstones, designed by Edward Bertine between 1891 and 1895.

St. Ann's Episcopal Church is located on the west side of St. Ann's Avenue, between East 139th and East 141st Streets. It is the Bronx's oldest church, having been built in 1841 and dedicated to Gouverneur Morris's mother Ann. Notable figures buried there include Lewis Morris, a signer of the Declaration of Independence; Gouverneur Morris; and former Mayor of New York City, R. H. Morris.

=== Public housing projects ===
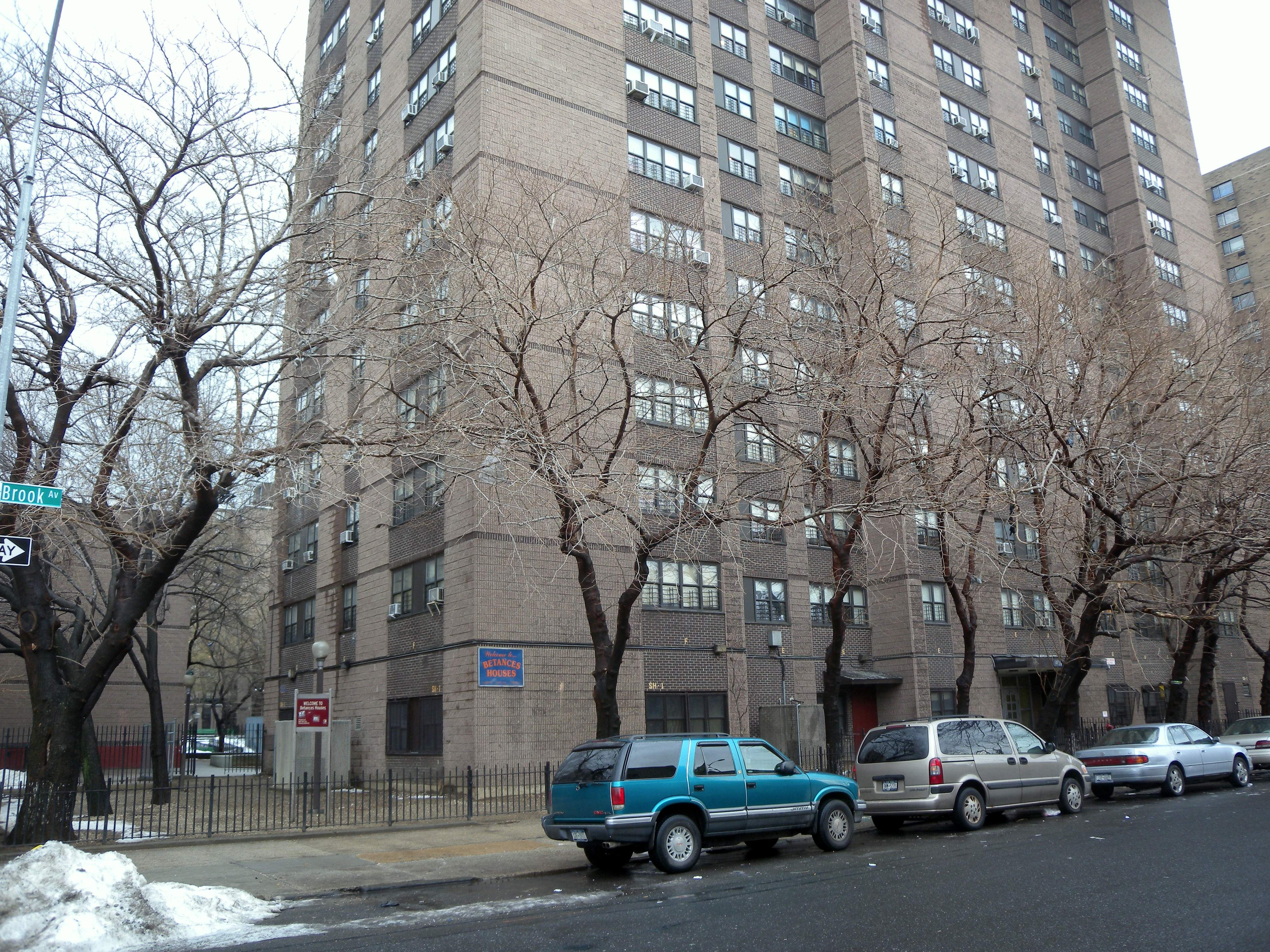
NYCHA Betances Houses on Brook Avenue

The seventeen NYCHA developments in Mott Haven illustrate the various types of public-housing initiatives in vogue in New York City over the decades.

1. Dr. Ramon E. Betances I; thirteen buildings, 3, 4, 11 and 19 stories tall
2. Dr. Ramon E. Betances II, 13; one 6-story building
3. Dr. Ramon E. Betances II, 18; two buildings, 4 and 6 stories tall
4. Dr. Ramon E. Betances II, 9A; one 4-story building
5. Dr. Ramon E. Betances III, 13; two rehabilitated tenement buildings, 5 stories tall
6. Dr. Ramon E. Betances III, 18; one rehabilitated and three abandoned tenement buildings, 5 stories tall
7. Dr. Ramon E. Betances III, 9A; two rehabilitated tenement buildings, 6 stories tall
8. Dr. Ramon E. Betances IV; eight buildings, 3, 4 and 5 stories tall with 282 apartments
9. Dr. Ramon E. Betances V; six rehabilitated tenement buildings, 5 and 6 stories tall
10. Dr. Ramon E. Betances VI; three rehabilitated tenement buildings, 5 and 6 stories tall
11. Millbrook Houses; nine 16-story buildings
12. Millbrook Extension; one 16-story building
13. Mitchel Houses; ten buildings, 17, 19, and 20 stories tall
14. Moore Houses; two 20-story buildings
15. Mott Haven Houses; eight buildings, 20 and 22 stories tall
16. Patterson Houses; fifteen buildings, 6 and 13 stories tall
17. Southern Boulevard M.H.O.P. (Multi Family Homeownership Program); one 7-story rehabilitated tenement building

== Media ==
The Mott Haven Herald is a news outlet that reports in Mott Haven, Melrose and Port Morris. It is produced by students at the City University Graduate School of Journalism and edited by Joe Hirsch.

== Police and crime ==
Mott Haven and Melrose are patrolled by the 40th Precinct of the NYPD, located at 567 E 149th St. The 40th Precinct ranked 59th safest out of 69 patrol areas for per-capita crime in 2010. As of 2018, with a non-fatal assault rate of 186 per 100,000 people, Mott Haven and Melrose's rate of violent crimes per capita was greater than that of the city as a whole. The incarceration rate of 1,214 per 100,000 people was higher than that of the city as a whole.

The 40th Precinct has a lower crime rate than in the 1990s, with crimes across all categories having decreased by 84.7% between 1990 and 2025. The precinct reported 11 murders, 51 rapes, 552 robberies, 905 felony assaults, 365 burglaries, 850 grand larcenies, and 234 grand larcenies auto in 2025.

== Fire safety ==
Mott Haven contains three New York City Fire Department (FDNY) fire stations:

- Squad 41 – 330 East 150th Street
- Engine Company 60/Ladder Company 17/Battalion 14 – 341 East 143rd Street
- Engine Company 83/Ladder Company 29 – 618 East 138th Street

In addition, FDNY EMS Station 14 is located at Lincoln Hospital at 234 East 149th Street.

== Health ==
As of 2018, preterm births and births to teenage mothers were more common in Mott Haven and Melrose than in other places citywide. In Mott Haven and Melrose, there were 95 preterm births per 1,000 live births (compared to 87 per 1,000 citywide), and 35.1 births to teenage mothers per 1,000 live births (compared to 19.3 per 1,000 citywide). Mott Haven and Melrose has a relatively high population of residents who are uninsured. In 2018, this population of uninsured residents was estimated to be 14%, slightly higher than the citywide rate of 12%.

The concentration of fine particulate matter, the deadliest type of air pollutant, in Mott Haven and Melrose is 0.0086 milligrams per cubic metre (8.6×10^{−9} oz/ft^{3}), more than the city average. Fifteen percent of Mott Haven and Melrose residents are smokers, which is higher than the city average of 14% of residents being smokers. In Mott Haven and Melrose, 42% of residents are obese, 20% are diabetic, and 38% have high blood pressure—compared to the citywide averages of 24%, 11%, and 28%, respectively. In addition, 24% of children are obese, compared to the citywide average of 20%.

Eighty-two percent of residents eat some fruits and vegetables every day, which is less than the city's average of 87%. In 2018, 72% of residents described their health as "good", "very good" " or "excellent", lower than the city's average of 78%. For every supermarket in Mott Haven and Melrose, there are 25 bodegas.

The nearest hospital is NYC Health + Hospitals/Lincoln.

== Post offices and ZIP Codes ==
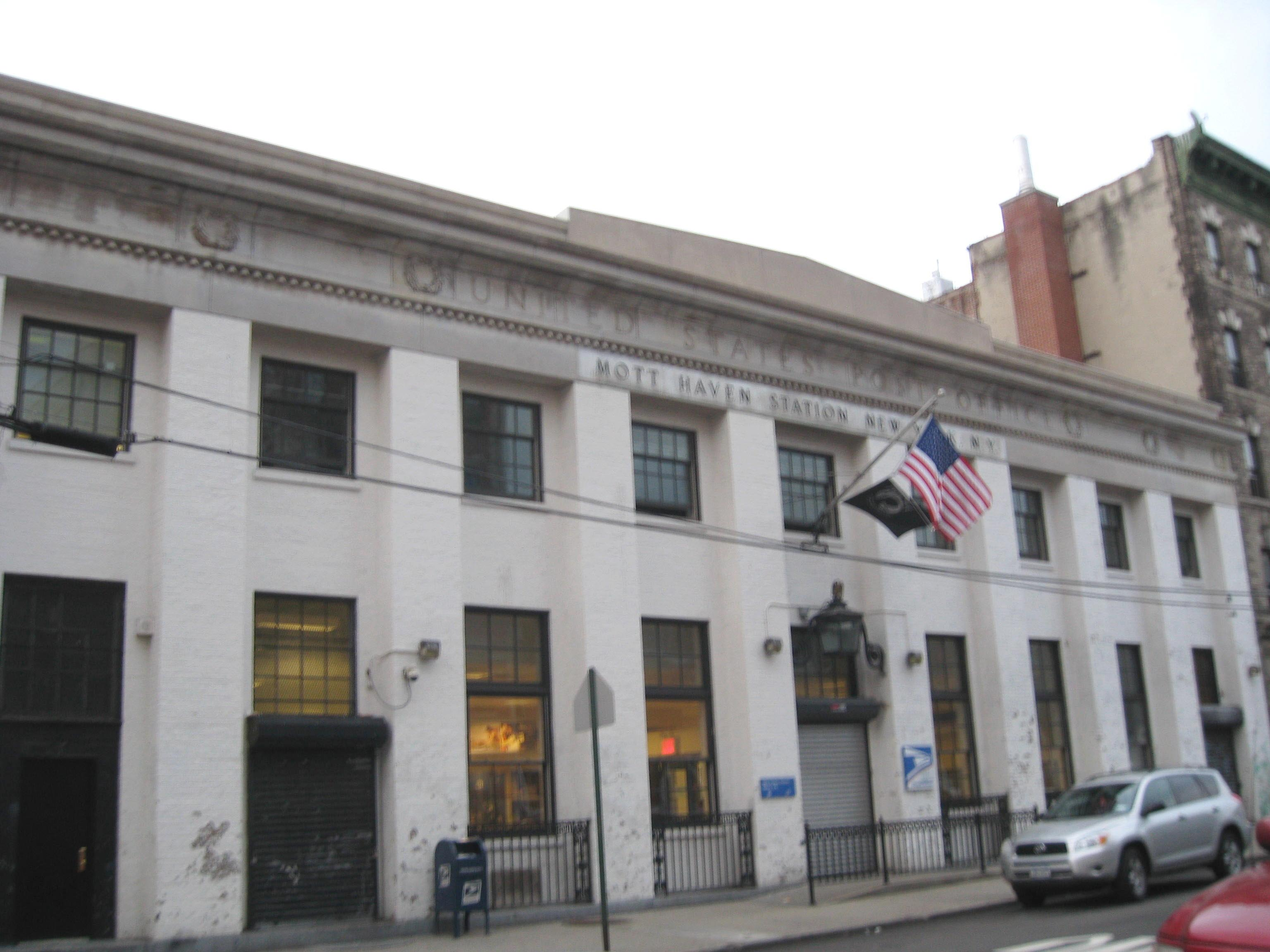
Post office

Mott Haven is covered by multiple ZIP Codes. The section west of Third Avenue is part of 10451, while the sections east of Third Avenue are part of 10455 (north of 145th Street). The section south of 145th Street is part of 10454. The United States Postal Service operates three post offices in Mott Haven:

- Bronx Station – 558 Grand Concourse
- Mott Haven Station – 517 East 139th Street
- Hub Station – 633 St. Ann's Avenue
- Uptown Parcel Annex Station – 845 East 136th Street

== Education ==
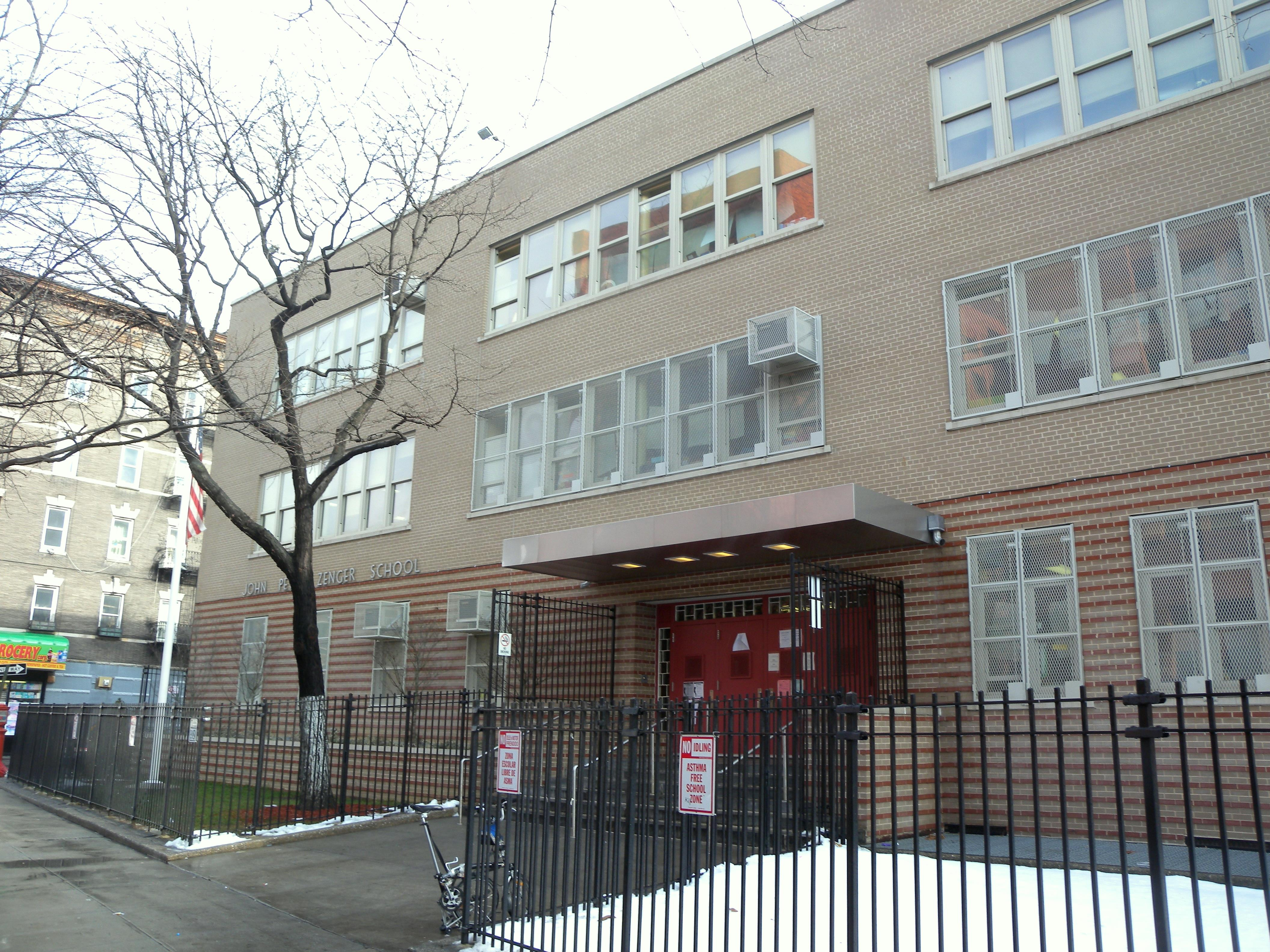
PS 18, Morris Avenue

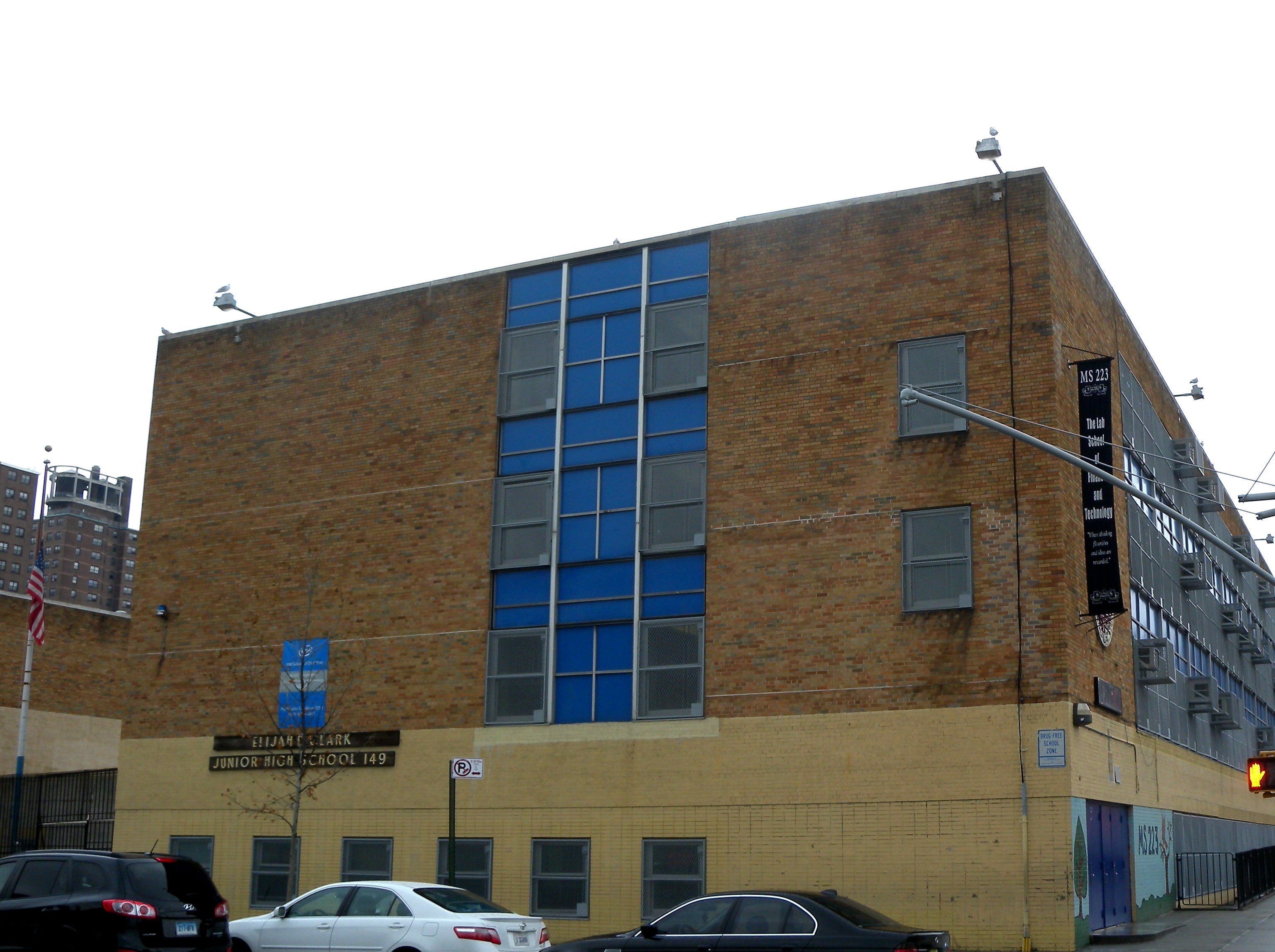
JHS 149, Willis Avenue

Mott Haven and Melrose generally had a lower rate of college-educated residents than the rest of the city, as of 2018. While 16% of residents age 25 and older have a college education or higher, 41% have less than a high school education and 43% are high school graduates or have some college education. By contrast, 26% of Bronx residents and 43% of city residents have a college education or higher. The percentage of Mott Haven and Melrose students excelling in math rose from 18% in 2000 to 37% in 2011, though reading achievement decreased slightly from 25% to 24% during the same time period.

Mott Haven and Melrose's rate of elementary school student absenteeism is more than the rest of New York City. In Mott Haven and Melrose, 32% of elementary school students missed twenty or more days per school year, higher than the citywide average of 20%. Additionally, 62% of high school students in Mott Haven and Melrose graduate on time, lower than the citywide average of 75%.

=== Schools ===
Public:

- South Bronx Classical Charter School II (East 135th Street and Alexander Avenue)
- P.S. 18 John Peter Zenger School (East 148th Street and Morris Avenue)
- P.S. 277 Dr. Evelina Lopez Antonetty (East 147th Street and St. Ann's Avenue)
- P.S 25 Bilingual School (811 East 149th Street)
- P.S. 30 Wilton School (East 141st Street and Brook Avenue)
- P.S. 40 Mott Haven Village (East 140th Street and Brook Avenue)
- P.S. 43 Jonas Bronck School (East 136th Street and Brown Place)
- P.S. 49 Willis Avenue School (East 139th Street and Willis Avenue)
- P.S. 65 Mother Hale Academy (East 141st Street and Cypress Avenue)
- I.S. 139 A. Burger Intermediate School (East 143rd Street and Brook Avenue)
- I.S. 162 Lola Rodriguez de Tio (East 149th Street and St. Ann's Avenue)
- M.S. 223: The Laboratory School of Finance and Technology (East 145th Street and Willis Avenue)
- P.S. 154 Johnathan D. Hyatt School (East 135th Street and Alexander Avenue)
- I.S. 183 Paul Robeson School (East 140th Street and Morris Avenue)
- P.S. 754 School for Career Development/Foreign Language Academy of Global Studies (East 147th Street and Jackson Avenue)
- P.S. 221 South Bronx Preparatory: A College Board School (East 144th Street and Willis Avenue)
- P.S. 369 Young Leaders Elementary School (East 140th Street)
- Leaders of Excellence, Advocacy and Discovery (639 St. Ann's Avenue)
- South Bronx Charter School for International Cultures and the Arts
- The Bronx Charter School for Children
- The Bronx Academy of Letters
- Bronx School for Law Government and Justice
- Health Opportunities High School
- Community School for Social Justice
- Family Life Academy Charter School II
- Dream Charter School (K-12 Campus: Mott Haven Elementary School, Mott Haven Middle School, Mott Haven High School)
- New York City Montessori Charter School
- Mott Haven Academy Charter School
- Samuel Gompers High School (closed)
- KIPP Academy Elementary School
- KIPP Academy Middle School
- Success Academy Bronx 1
- Eugenio María de Hostos Community College of The City University of New York (CUNY)
- Hostos Lincoln Academy (600 St. Anns Ave)
- Strive Charter School

Parochial:

- Saint Luke School
- Saint Pius V School
- Saint Pius V High School
- St. Anselm's School

=== Library ===
The New York Public Library operates the Mott Haven branch at 321 East 140th Street. The branch, a Carnegie library, opened in 1905 and is a New York City designated landmark.

== Transportation ==
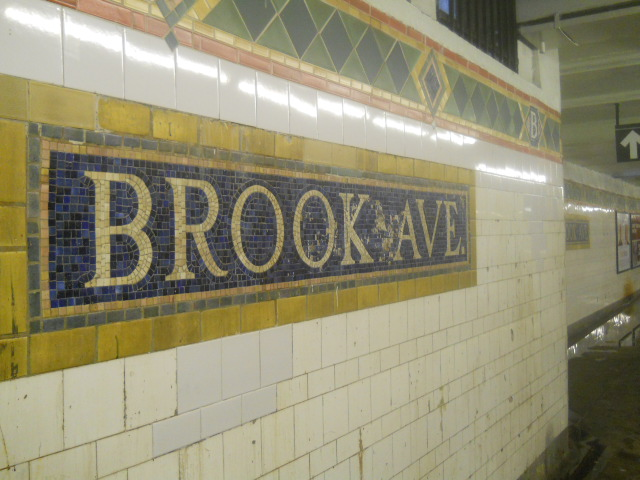
A mosaic along the platform of Brook Avenue station

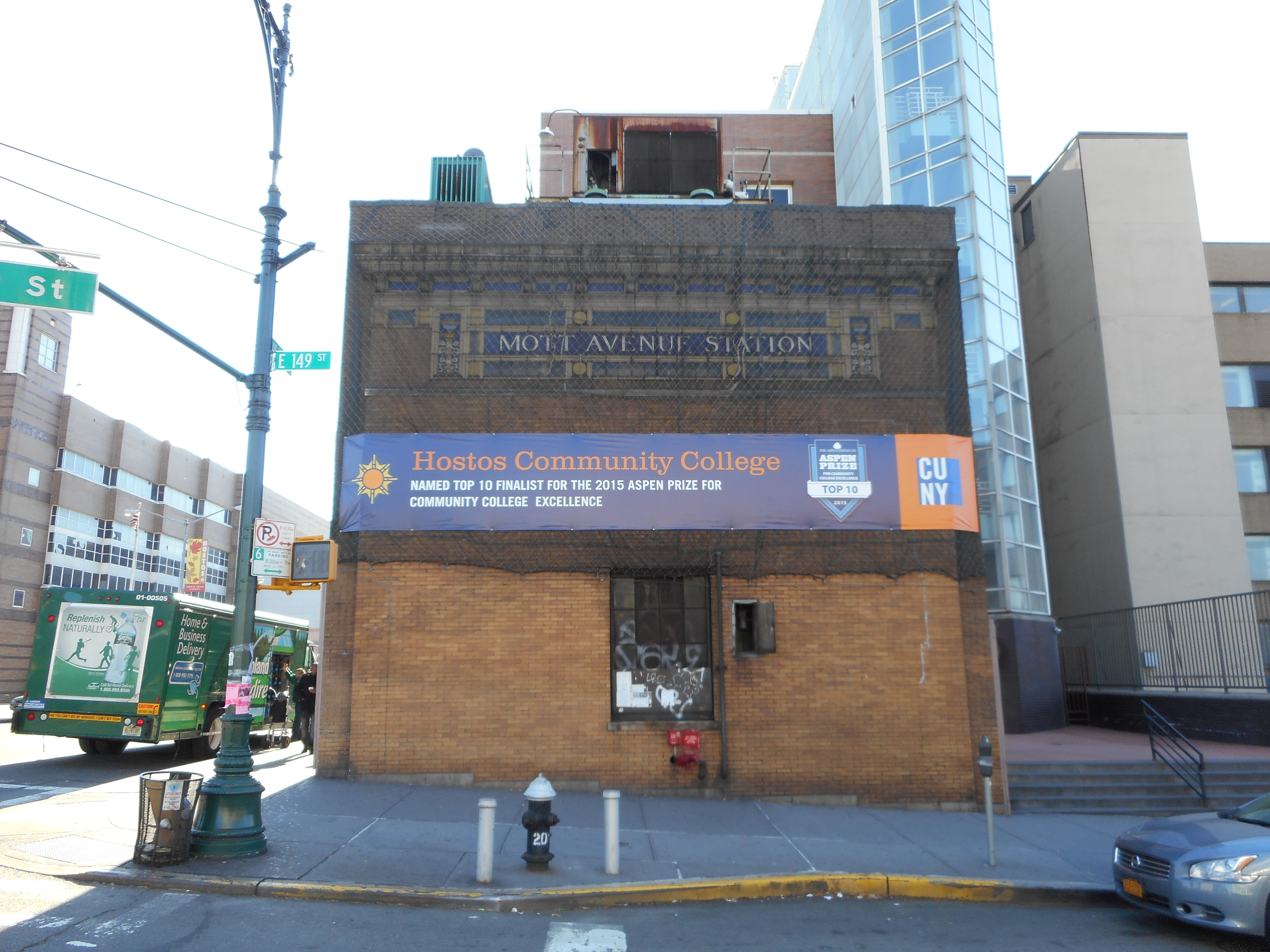
The historic and closed off Mott Avenue Control House, now part of the 149th Street-Grand Concourse Subway Complex

The following New York City Subway stations serve Mott Haven:

- 138th Street–Grand Concourse (4 and 5 trains)
- Third Avenue–138th Street (6 and <6> trains)
- Brook Avenue (6 train)
- Cypress Avenue (6 train)
- East 143rd Street–St. Mary's Street (6 train)
- 149th Street–Grand Concourse (2, 4, and 5 trains)
- Third Avenue–149th Street (2 and 5 trains)

The following MTA Regional Bus Operations bus routes serve Mott Haven:

- Bx1: to Riverdale (via Grand Concourse)
- Bx2: to Kingsbridge Heights (via Grand Concourse)
- Bx4: to Westchester Square (via Westchester Avenue)
- Bx17: to Fordham Plaza (via Prospect and Crotona Avenues)
- Bx19: to Riverbank State Park or Bronx Park (via 149th Street and Southern Boulevard)
- Bx21: to Westchester Square – East Tremont Avenue (6 and <6> trains) (via Boston Road and Morris Park Avenue)
- Bx32: to VA Hospital (via Morris Avenue and Jerome Avenue)
- Bx33: to Harlem or Port Morris, Bronx (via 138th Street)
- Bx41 (including Select Bus Service): to Williamsbridge (via Melrose and Webster Avenues)
- M125: to The Hub or Manhattanville (via Willis Avenue and 125th Street)

The 145th Street Bridge and Madison Avenue Bridge eastward and the Willis Avenue Bridge northward from Manhattan lead to Mott Haven and are maintained by the New York City Department of Transportation. The Triborough Bridge, which also ends in Mott Haven, is maintained by the MTA Bridges and Tunnels, and is tolled.

== Notable residents ==
People who were born, raised, or live in Mott Haven include:

- A.G., rapper of the duo Showbiz and A.G. was raised in the Patterson Houses.
- Danny Aiello (1933–2019), actor who lived on Bergen Avenue and attended Monroe High School
- Nate Archibald (born 1948), former NBA player, was raised in the Patterson Houses.
- Iran Barkley (born 1960), former boxer was raised in the Patterson Houses.
- Jonas Bronck (died 1643), sea captain who was the borough's first European settler and after whom the Bronx is named.
- Bobby Darin (1936–1973), singer who lived at 629 East 135 Street and attended P.S. 43.
- ESG, band, are from the Moore Houses.
- Pedro Espada Jr. (born 1953), former member of the New York Senate, who was convicted on federal corruption charges in May 2012 and sentenced to five years in prison.
- Guy Fisher (born 1947), former drug lord is from the Patterson Houses.
- Edward J. Flynn (1891–1953), politician who served as chairman of the Democratic National Committee from 1940 to 1943.
- Kase2 (1958–2011), graffiti artist, is from the Moore Houses.
- Jonathan Luna (1965–2003) lawyer who served as Assistant United States Attorney in Baltimore.
- French Montana (born 1984), rapper, is from the Mott Haven Houses.
- Percee P (born 1969), rapper, was raised in the Patterson Houses.
- Johnny Pacheco (1935–2021), musician, arranger, composer, producer and bandleader of Cuban music, who coined the term "salsa" to denote the genre.
- Luis Antonio Ramos (born 1973), actor, is from the Patterson Houses.
- Prince Royce (born 1989), singer, is from the Patterson Houses.
- José E. Serrano (born 1943), United States Congressman, representing the Bronx, was raised in the Millbrook Houses.
- Rod Strickland (born 1966), NBA player, was raised in the Mitchel Houses.
