= Third Avenue–138th Street station =

New York City Subway station in the Bronx

3 Avenue–138 Street
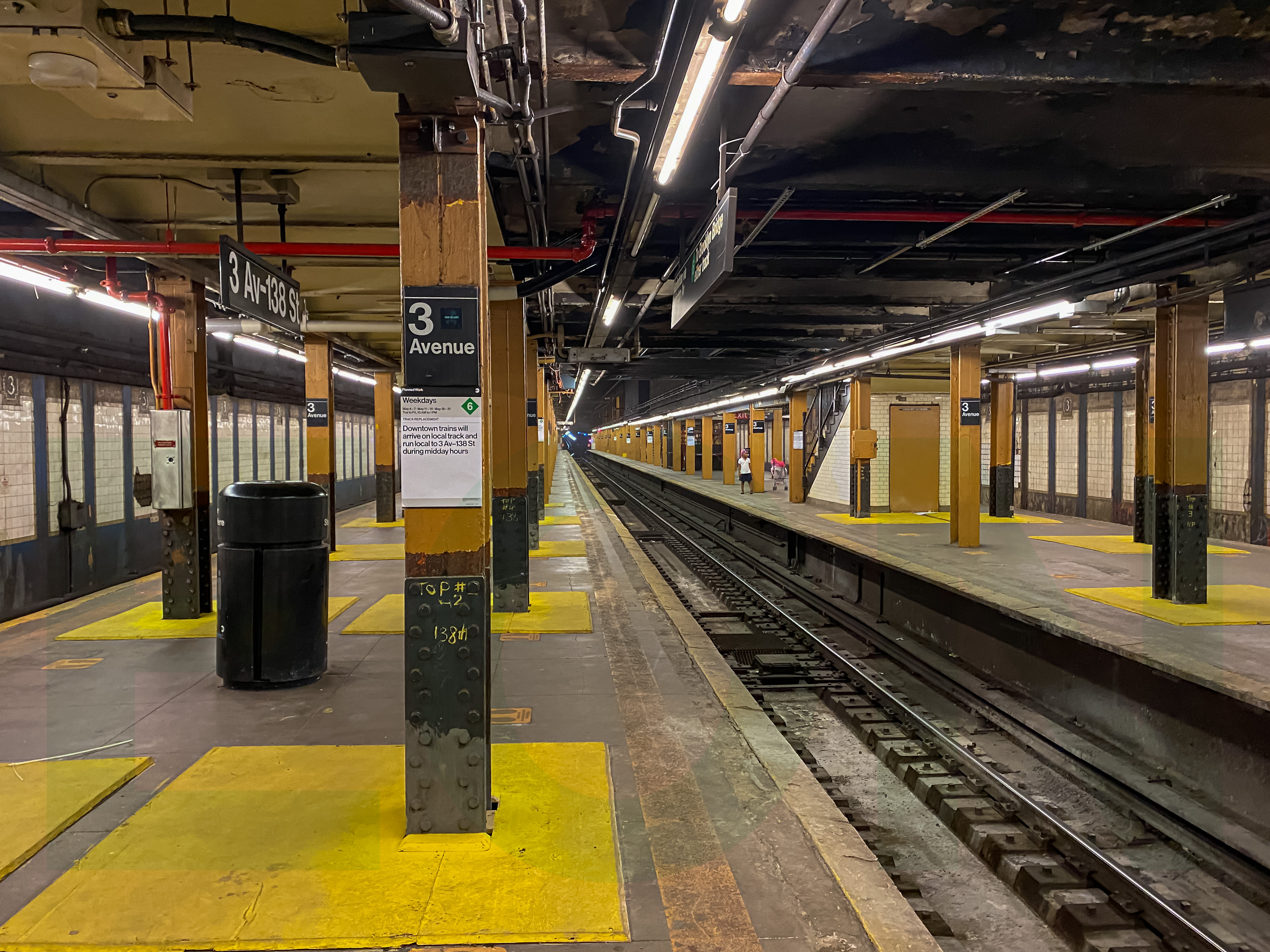
- View from the southbound platform

Station statistics
- Address: Third Avenue and East 138th Street; Bronx, New York
- Borough: The Bronx
- Locale: Mott Haven
- Coordinates: 40.810963°N 73.927217°W
- Division: A (IRT)
- Line: IRT Pelham Line
- Services: 6 (all times) <6> (weekdays until 8:45 p.m., peak direction)
- Transit: NYCT Bus: Bx1, Bx2, Bx21, Bx32, Bx33, M125
- Structure: Underground
- Platforms: 2 island platforms cross-platform interchange
- Tracks: 3

Other information
- Opened: August 1, 1918; 108 years ago
- Accessible: No; under construction

Traffic
- 2025: 1,802,356 ▲9.6%
- Rank: 199 out of 423
Services
| Preceding station | New York City Subway | Following station |
|---|---|---|
| Hunts Point Avenue <6> toward Pelham Bay Park | Express | 125th Street 6 <6> toward Brooklyn Bridge–City Hall |
| Brook Avenue 6 toward Pelham Bay Park | Local | 125th Street 6 <6> toward Brooklyn Bridge–City Hall |
Location
Location within New York City Subway
Location within New York City
Location within New York
Track layout
Street map
Station service legend
| Symbol | Description |
| Stops all times | Stops all times |
| Stops rush hours in the peak direction only | Stops rush hours in the peak direction only |

The Third Avenue–138th Street station is an express station on the IRT Pelham Line of the New York City Subway located at the intersection of Third Avenue and East 138th Street in the Mott Haven neighborhood of the Bronx. It is served by the 6 train at all times and the <6> train during weekdays in the peak direction. The station is slated to undergo renovations to become compliant with the Americans with Disabilities Act of 1990.

== History ==
=== Background ===
In 1913, New York City, the Brooklyn Rapid Transit Company, and the Interborough Rapid Transit Company (IRT) reached an agreement, known as the Dual Contracts, to expand subway service across the City dramatically. The portion of the agreement between New York City and the IRT was known as Contract 3. As part of this contract, the IRT agreed to construct a branch of the original subway, which opened in 1904, north along Lexington Avenue with branches along Jerome Avenue and a three-track branch running northeast via 138th Street, Southern Boulevard and Westchester Avenue to Pelham Bay Park.

The construction of the Lexington Avenue Line, in conjunction with the construction of the Broadway–Seventh Avenue Line would change the operations of the IRT system. Instead of having trains go via Broadway, turning onto 42nd Street, before finally turning onto Park Avenue, there would be two trunk lines connected by the 42nd Street Shuttle. The system would be changed from looking like a "Z" system on a map to an "H" system. One trunk would run via the new Lexington Avenue Line down Park Avenue, and the other trunk would run via the new Seventh Avenue Line up Broadway.

=== Opening ===
The Third Avenue–138th Street station was opened on August 1, 1918, and was the first station of the IRT Pelham Line to open. Service was provided by Lexington Avenue Line local service. The construction of the Pelham Line was part of the Dual Contracts, signed on March 19, 1913 and also known as the Dual Subway System. The Pelham Line was proposed to be a branch of the Lexington Avenue Line running northeast via 138th Street, Southern Boulevard and Westchester Avenue to Pelham Bay Park. This was the terminal of the line until January 7, 1919, when the Pelham Line was extended to Hunts Point Avenue.

Under the 2015–2019 MTA Capital Plan, the station, along with thirty other New York City Subway stations, will undergo a complete overhaul and would be entirely closed for up to 6 months. Updates would include cellular service, Wi-Fi, charging stations, improved signage, and improved station lighting. However, these renovations are being deferred until the 2020–2024 Capital Program due to a lack of funding. In 2019, the MTA announced that this station would become ADA-accessible as part of the agency's 2020–2024 Capital Program. In early 2024, to discourage fare evasion, the MTA reconfigured emergency exits at the station so the exits opened only after a 15-second delay. The renovation of the station was to be funded by congestion pricing in New York City, but the renovation was postponed in June 2024 after the implementation of congestion pricing was delayed. However, after congestion pricing was approved, the MTA announced that the elevator installations would proceed.

== Station layout ==
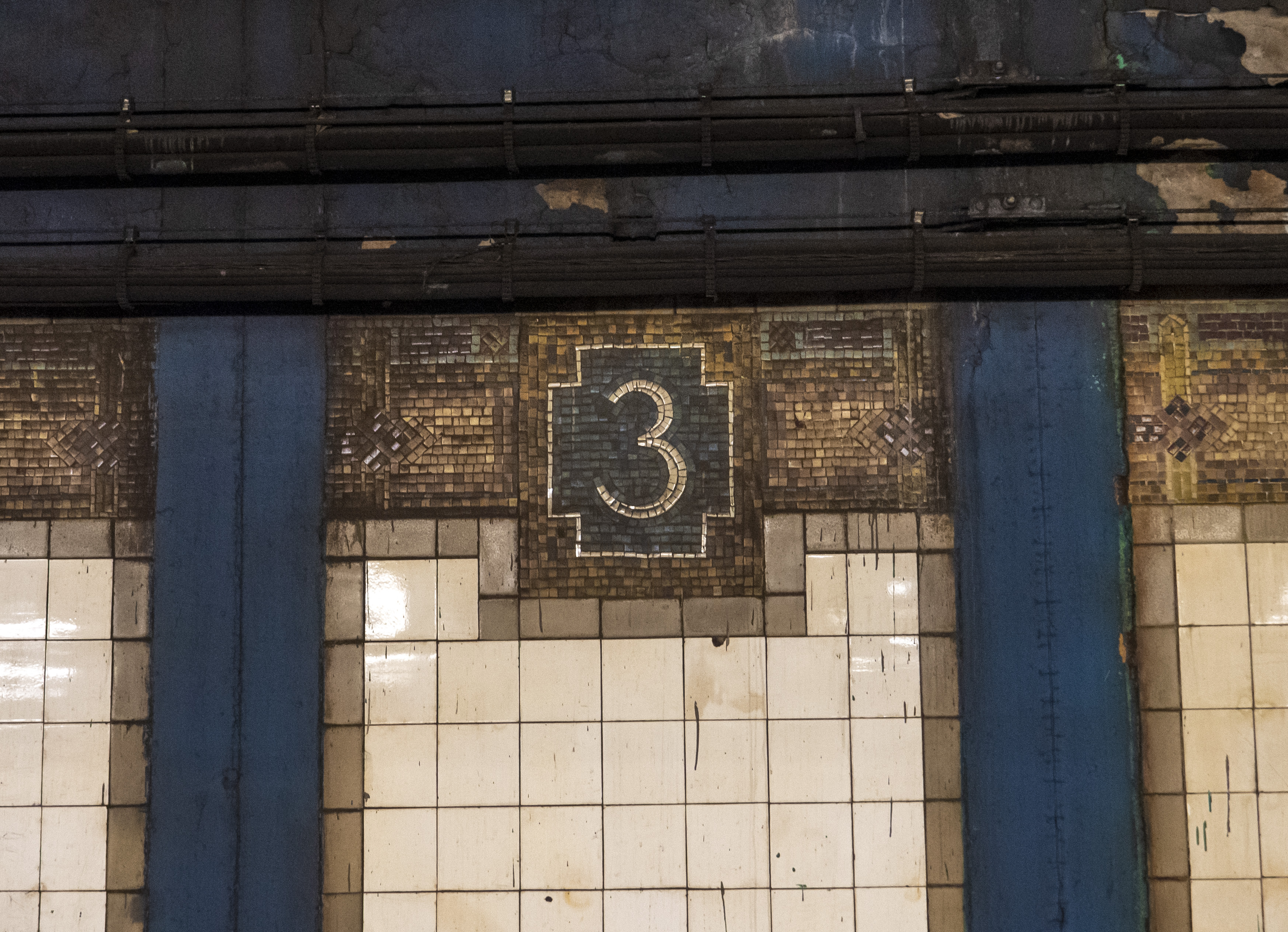
Mosaic "3" frieze on trim

The station has two island platforms and three tracks, with the center track used for weekday peak direction express service. The 6 stops at the station at all times, while the <6> stops there during weekdays in the peak direction. The next stop to the south is 125th Street. The next stop to the north is Brook Avenue for local trains and Hunts Point Avenue for express trains. During weekday morning rush hour, two southbound 6 trains originate here.

The mosaic trim on the station's track walls are predominantly tan and buff, with the numeral "3" shown in slightly cruciform-shaped friezes with a slate blue background appearing at regular intervals. Clusters of small blue diamonds set in dark blue sit on either side of these plaques. A crossover exists via the mezzanine, and a closed crossunder is located at the center of the platforms. A high ceiling is found in the station and the northbound platform has an old tower at the south end.

To the south, the line goes under the Harlem River into Manhattan and merges with the IRT Jerome Avenue Line to form the IRT Lexington Avenue Line. Just before the slight jog going towards Manhattan, a provision was provided in anticipation of its connection with the then newly planned Second Avenue Subway, which was originally planned to take over the service south of this point, and relieve congestion on the IRT Lexington Avenue Subway.

A paid transfer was available to the IRT Third Avenue Line at the 138th Street station. This is the southernmost station in the Bronx on the IRT Pelham Line.

=== Exits ===
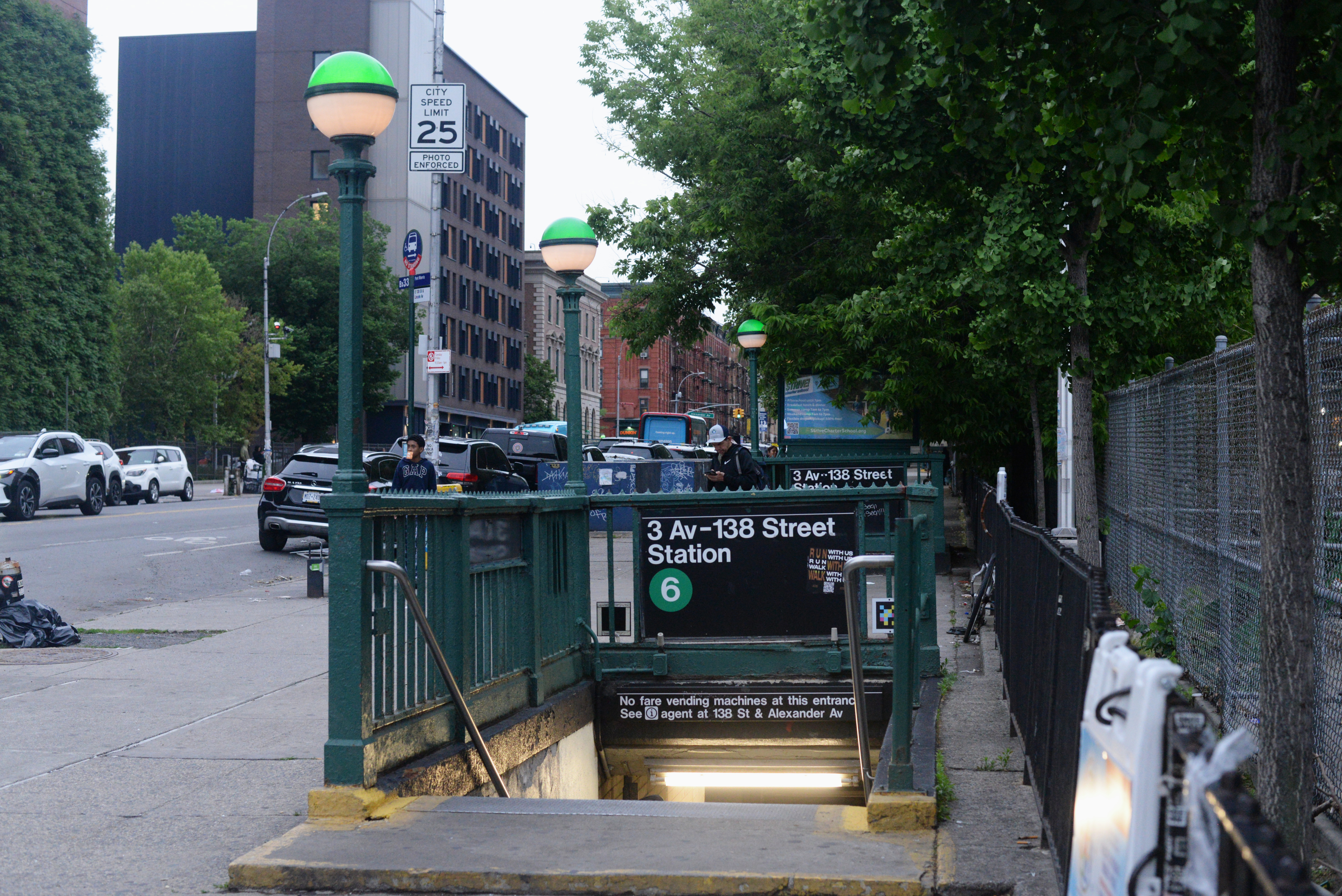
Third Avenue entrances

| Exit location | Number of exits | Platform served |
|---|---|---|
| NE corner of 138 Street and Third Avenue | 1 | Both (HEET turnstile entrance only.) |
| SE corner of 138 Street and Third Avenue | 2 | Both (HEET turnstile entrance only.) |
| NW corner of 138 Street and Alexander Avenue | 2 | Both |
| SW corner of 138 Street and Alexander Avenue | 2 | Both |
