= Bx12 bus =

Bus route in New York City

bx12 bx12
- Fordham Road−Pelham Parkway; 207th Street Crosstown Line
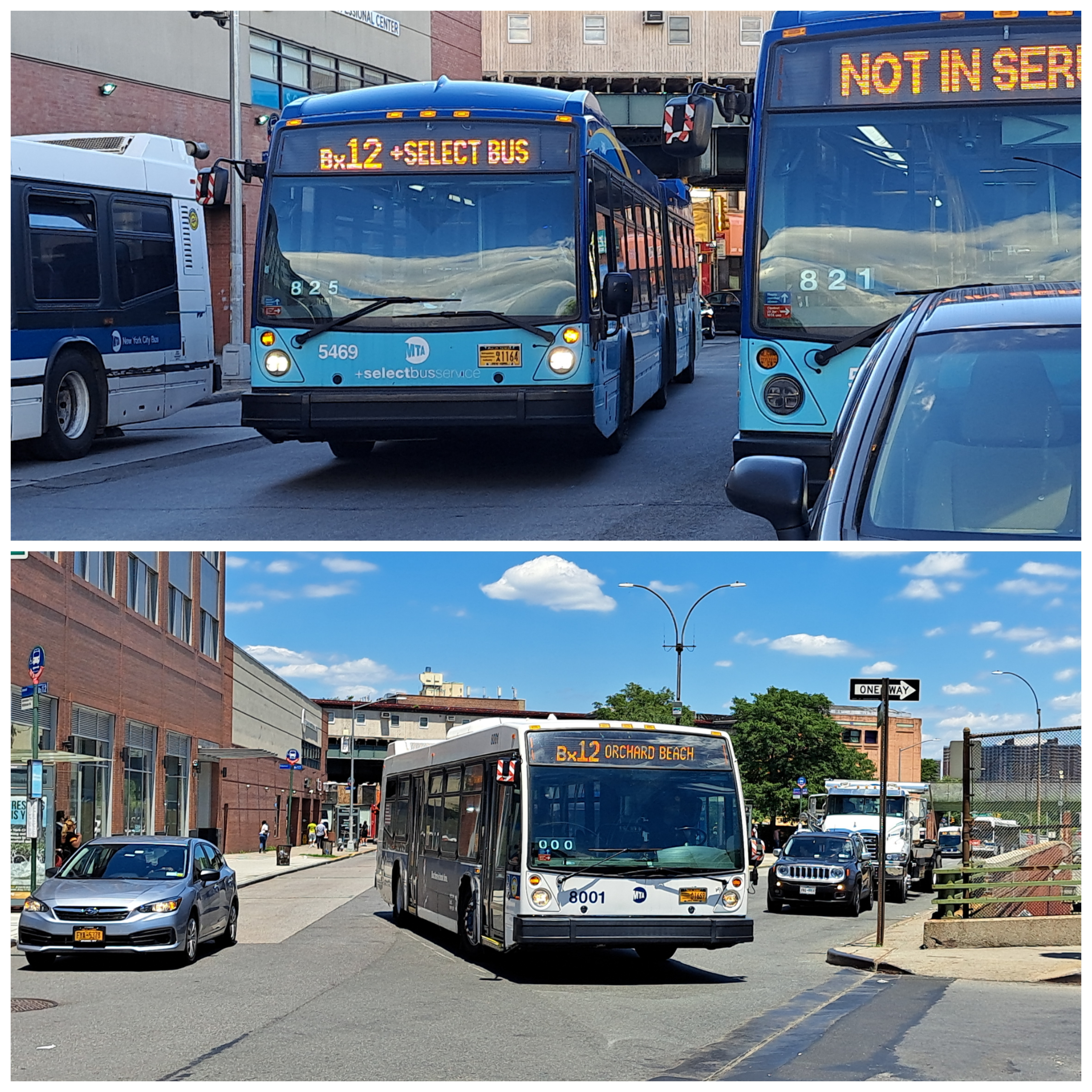
- A 2017 Nova Bus LFS Articulated (5469) on the Bx12 SBS and a 2011 Nova Bus LFS (8001) on the Bx12 Local at Pelham Bay Park station.

Overview
- System: MTA Regional Bus Operations
- Operator: Manhattan and Bronx Surface Transit Operating Authority
- Garage: Gun Hill Depot; Kingsbridge Depot (local summer service)
- Vehicle: Nova Bus LFS articulated (main vehicle); New Flyer Xcelsior XD60 (local main; SBS supplemental); Nova Bus LFS; Nova Bus LFS HEV; New Flyer Xcelsior XD40; New Flyer Xcelsior XE40 (supplemental service); Nova Bus LFSe+ (local summer supplemental)
- Livery: Bx12 SBS: Select Bus Service

Route
- Locale: The Bronx and Manhattan, New York, U.S.
- Communities served: Inwood, University Heights, Fordham, Belmont, Allerton, Morris Park, Pelham Gardens, Pelham Bay, Baychester, Co-op City
- Landmarks served: Fordham Plaza, Fordham University, New York Botanical Garden, Bronx Zoo, Pelham Bay Park, Bay Plaza Shopping Center, Orchard Beach
- Start: Inwood – Broadway / 207th Street (full route); University Heights – Sedgwick Avenue (daytime local)
- Via: 207th Street, Fordham Road, Pelham Parkway
- End: Pelham Bay Park (daytime local); Orchard Beach (summertime local); Baychester – Edson Avenue (late night); Bay Plaza Shopping Center (full route) (Note: Overnights, no service operates to Bay Plaza)
- Length: 8.2 miles (13.2 km)

Service
- Operates: 24 hours (Bx12 Local) (Note: Bx12 SBS does not operate overnights)
- Annual patronage: 6,005,355 (2025)
- Timetable: Bx12 Bx12 SBS

The Bx12 is a public transit line in New York City bus route running east-west along 207th Street in Upper Manhattan and along the continuous Fordham Road and Pelham Parkway in the Bronx.

The line started operating in the early 1900s as a streetcar line between Inwood in Manhattan and Belmont in the Bronx. This line was known as the 207th Street Crosstown Line, the Fordham Road−207th Street Crosstown Line or the Fordham Road Crosstown Line.

In 1948, the streetcar route was converted into a bus route, operated by the New York City Transit Authority under the subsidiary Manhattan and Bronx Surface Transit Operating Authority (MaBSTOA). Throughout the late 20th century, several separate bus routes were combined to form the Bx12. The bus line became the first bus rapid transit route to enter service in the city in 2008, when the Bx12 Limited became the Bx12 Select Bus Service (SBS). Both the Bx12 local and SBS carry over 53,000 riders each weekday. In 2025, the total ridership was 6,005,355, making it the third-busiest line citywide.

== Route description and service ==
=== Current bus service ===
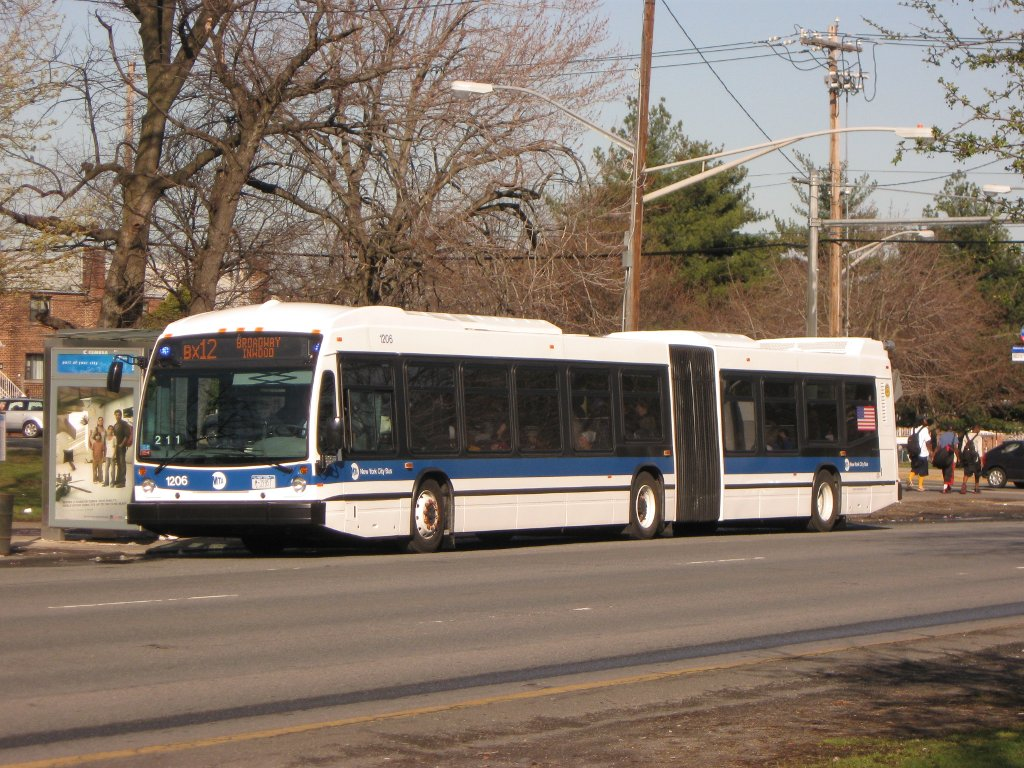
A 2010 Nova Bus LFS Articulated (1206) on the Inwood-bound Bx12 SBS picks up customers at the Eastchester Road stop along Pelham Parkway, prior to SBS wrap

The Bx12 runs crosstown from Inwood in Manhattan to various areas in the northeastern Bronx. The line, eastward, begins at the Inwood–207th Street subway station (A train) on Broadway and West 207th Street. The Bx12 then loops around via Isham Street and Sherman Avenue and rejoins West 207th Street, continuing across the University Heights Bridge into University Heights. The route runs along Fordham Road through Fordham Center, Fordham Plaza, and Belmont until the road becomes Pelham Parkway near the Bronx Zoo and New York Botanical Garden in Bronx Park. The route then runs along Pelham Parkway's main roadway to Pelham Bay, where it takes a somewhat circuitous route. The line turns off Pelham Parkway onto Burr Avenue stopping at the Pelham Bay Park subway station. From here, the Bx12 services that do not terminate here make a U-turn and join the New England Thruway to Bay Plaza or veer east along Shore Road to Orchard Beach.

At the Pelham Bay Park station, Manhattan-bound buses use stops along southbound Amendola Place. The setup requires westbound service to make a U-turn onto Shore Road before heading onto Pelham Parkway.

During the daytime and evening hours, local service runs between Sedgwick/Webb Avenue in University Heights and the Pelham Bay Park subway station (6 and <6> trains). Some local service also originates from Belmont Avenue and 182nd Street in Belmont during the afternoons on school days. Most service between Manhattan and Bay Plaza is served by Bx12 Select buses during that time, although some local buses continue to Bay Plaza. During the summer, Bx12 local buses are extended to Orchard Beach, with all weekend service operating to/from Inwood during the summer. Some westbound buses terminate at Fordham Plaza or University Avenue.

During the overnight hours, all service runs local, serving the entire route with the exception of Bay Plaza. Buses instead terminate on Edson Avenue, in front of the Gun Hill Bus Depot, as the shopping center is closed during these times.

=== Select Bus Service ===
The Bx12 is New York City's first bus rapid transit service, marketed as Select Bus Service, which began on June 29, 2008. Selected as the Bronx corridor for the pilot project in 2004, the MTA, New York City Department of Transportation (NYCDOT) and the New York State Department of Transportation (NYSDOT) drew up plans to convert the Bx12's limited service to BRT. The route was selected for the project mainly because of its mostly straight crosstown route through the Bronx, intersecting with seven different subway lines and all Metro-North lines.

Buses are outfitted with special identification (including a special blue wrap and blue route signs) and traffic signal prioritization was enacted along the route, timing traffic signals in favor of the bus. When supplemental service is needed, the blue wrap may be absent. The NYCDOT also added dedicated bus lanes painted in maroon-red along Pelham Parkway and Fordham Road, with signs indicating that the lanes are bus-only from 7:00 am to 7:00 pm on weekdays, along with additional police enforcement. Off-board fare collection, via MetroCard fare machines and coin meters, allows passengers with proof of payment to board through any door. Bx12 Select Bus Service operates daily, from around 6am to 10pm weekdays, 7am-11pm weekends.

==== Stops ====
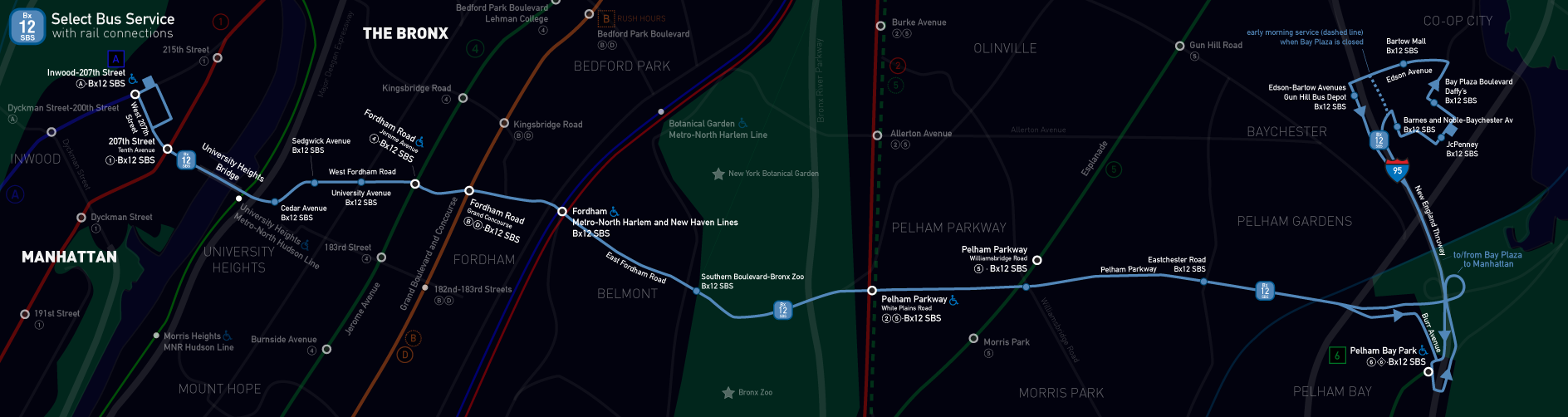
The Bx12 route (in light blue), as of Summer 2012

| Station Street traveled | Direction | Connections |
Manhattan
| West 207th / Isham Streets Broadway | Westbound terminus, eastbound station | NYC Bus: Bx7, Bx20; MTA Bus: BxM1; NYC Subway: train at Inwood–207th Street |
| Tenth Avenue West 207th Street | Bidirectional | NYC Bus: M100; NYC Subway: train at 207th Street |
University Heights Bridge
The Bronx
| Cedar Avenue West Fordham Road | Bidrectional | Metro-North: Hudson Line at University Heights (one block west at Major Deegan Expressway) |
| Sedgwick Avenue West Fordham Road (Note: Sedgwick Avenue stop added in January 2009.) | Bidrectional | NYC Bus: Bx12 Local |
| University Avenue West Fordham Road | Bidrectional | NYC Bus: Bx3, Bx12 Local |
| Jerome / Walton Avenues East Fordham Road | Bidrectional | NYC Bus: Bx12 Local, Bx32; NYC Subway: train at Fordham Road |
| Grand Concourse / Valentine Avenue East Fordham Road | Bidrectional | NYC Bus: Bx1, Bx2, Bx12 Local, Bx22, Bx34; Bee-Line: 62; NYC Subway: trains at Fordham Road |
| Webster and Third Avenues Fordham Plaza / Fordham University East Fordham Road | Bidrectional | NYC Bus: Bx9, Bx12 Local, Bx15, Bx17, Bx22, Bx41 Local, Bx41 SBS; Metro-North: Harlem and New Haven lines at Fordham; Bee-Line: 60, 61, 62 |
| Southern Boulevard Bronx Zoo / Botanical Garden East Fordham Road | Bidrectional | NYC Bus: Bx9, Bx12 Local, Bx19, Bx22; Bee-Line: 60, 61, 62 |
| White Plains Road Pelham Parkway | Bidrectional | MTA Bus: BxM11; NYC Bus: Bx12 Local, Bx30, Bx39; NYC Subway: trains at Pelham Parkway; Bee-Line: 60, 61, 62 |
| Williamsbridge Road Pelham Parkway | Bidrectional | NYC Bus: Bx8, Bx12 Local; NYC Subway: train at Pelham Parkway |
| Eastchester Road Jacobi Medical Center Pelham Parkway | Bidrectional | NYC Bus: Bx12 Local, Bx31; MTA Bus: BxM10 |
| Stillwell Avenue Pelham Parkway | Bidrectional | NYC Bus: Bx12 Local |
| Pelham Bay Park Amendola Plaza | Bidrectional | MTA Bus: Bx23, Q50, BxM8; NYCT Bus: Bx5, Bx12 Local, Bx24, Bx29; NYC Subway: trains at Pelham Bay Park; Bee-Line: 45 |
| Baychester Avenue Bay Plaza Boulevard | Eastbound | |
| Bay Plaza Shopping Center The Mall at Bay Plaza | Eastbound terminus, westbound station | NYC Bus: Bx5 (Weekend Only), Bx25, Bx38 |
| Co-Op City Boulevard Bay Plaza Boulevard | Westbound | NYC Bus: Bx5 (Weekend Only), Bx25, Bx38 |
| Bartow Avenue/Bartow Mall (Note: Bartow Mall stop added in Spring 2009.) | Westbound | MTA Bus: Bx23, Q50; NYC Bus: Bx5 (Weekend Only), Bx28 |
| Bartow Avenue Gun Hill Depot Edson Avenue | Westbound | NYC Bus: Bx5 (Weekend Only), Bx25, Bx26, Bx28, Bx38 |

== History ==
=== Streetcar service ===
The Fordham Road/Pelham Parkway service began as a streetcar line operated by the Union Railway Company, a subsidiary of the Third Avenue Railway, and was the last Union Railway franchise to be constructed. In February 1903, the company announced plans to construct a two-track line along Pelham Avenue (the former name of Fordham Road and Pelham Parkway) between Bronx Park and Pelham Bay Park, running through largely undeveloped land and parkland. Called the Pelham Avenue Line, its western terminus would be at Third Avenue in modern Fordham Plaza, at the Fordham station of the then-New York Central Railroad (now the Metro-North Railroad Harlem Line) and the entrance of what was then St. John's College (now Fordham University's Rose Hill campus). Its eastern end would be at the Pelham Bridge in Pelham Bay.

By 1904, the line was running along Fordham Avenue and Pelham Avenue (today's Fordham Road) between Sedgwick Avenue in University Heights and Third Avenue in Fordham. That year, the company released plans to extend the line west across the yet-to-be-constructed University Heights Bridge to Broadway and 207th Street in Inwood, Manhattan. By fall 1908, after the opening of the bridge, the Union Railway petitioned for an extension west to Manhattan, and east to Pelham Bay Park. By 1909, the planned eastern extension was truncated to Southern Boulevard, with both extension plans delayed due to deadlock in negotiations with the city. In 1910, the company once again petitioned the New York City Board of Estimate and the New York State Public Service Commission for a western extension to Manhattan, and for an eastern extension from Southern Boulevard to the eastern edge of Bronx Park (at about Boston Road, White Plains Road, and Bronx Park East). The Manhattan extension was finally granted in June 1910. Service across the bridge to Inwood began on November 29, 1910.

In late 1916, the railway petitioned for another extension along either Vermilyea Avenue or Nagle Avenue, and Dyckman Street west to the ferry terminal at the end of Dyckman Street, to connect with ferries to New Jersey and upstate New York, particularly the Palisades region and Palisades Interstate Park. The franchise was granted in December of that year. The extension was initially opposed since many streets in the area were narrow. Later, the Union Railway sought to annul the franchise agreement, which was opposed by the local Dyckman (Inwood/Washington Heights) community due to growing business interests created by the line. The extension was never implemented.

=== Conversion to bus service ===
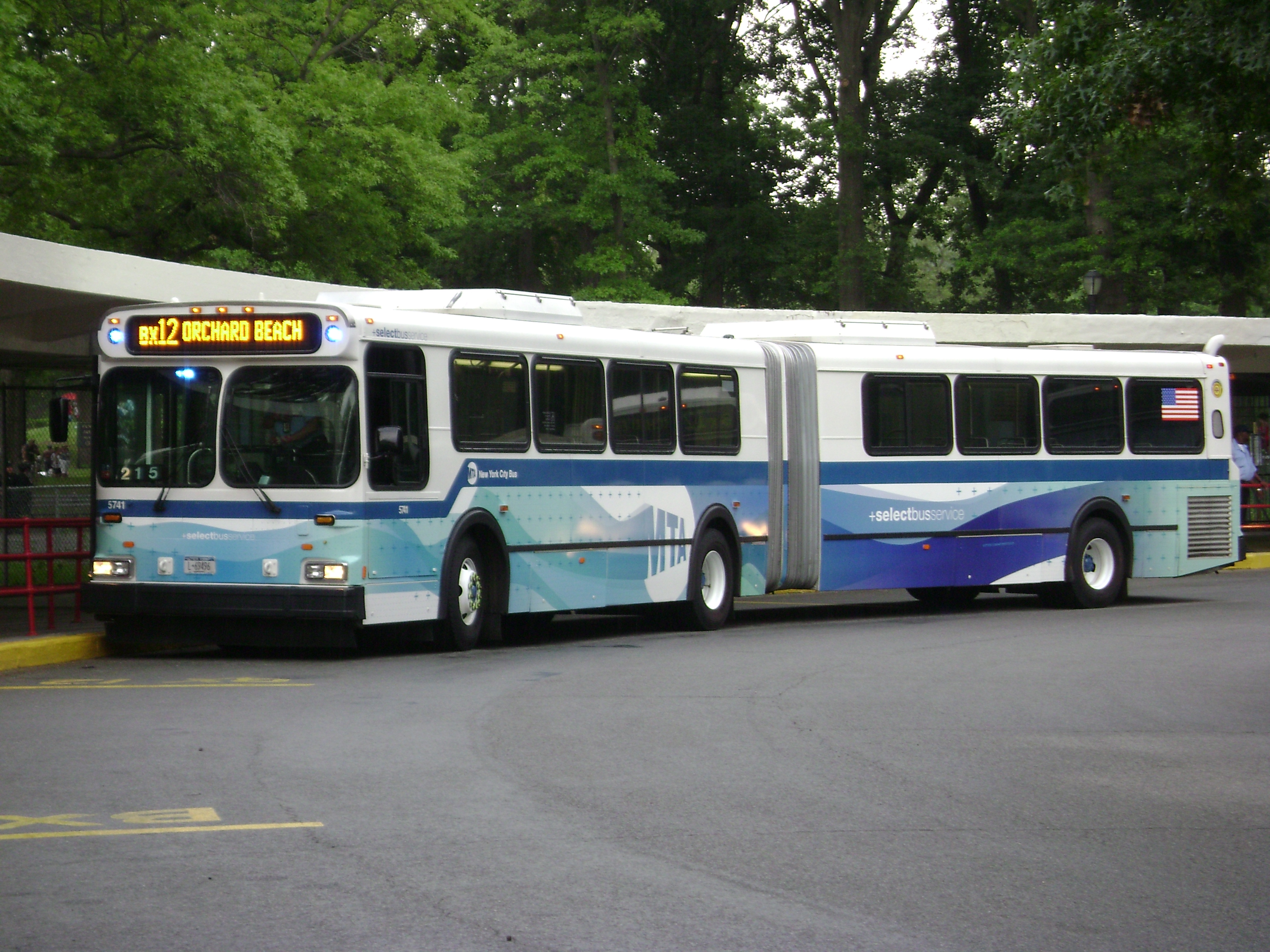
A 2003 New Flyer D60HF (5741) on the Bx12 SBS having just completed its trip to Orchard Beach in 2008. The Bx12 SBS no longer serves Orchard Beach, and all high-floor buses are retired.

Beginning in the 1920s, many streetcar lines in the Bronx, Manhattan, and the rest of the city began to be replaced by buses, particularly after the unification of the city's three primary transit companies in June 1940. That year, the railroad company began relinquishing its trolley franchises with the city, to be replaced by buses operated by the subsidiary Surface Transportation Corporation. The 207th Street Crosstown Line was replaced with the then-Bx19 bus service operating between Broadway-207th Street and Southern Boulevard on January 25, 1948, the same date as the motorization of the Bronx and Van Cortlandt Parks Crosstown Line (today's Bx9). The route would be operated by Surface Transit until 1956, and by the New York City Omnibus Corporation (later under the brand Fifth Avenue Coach Lines) until the company's routes were taken over by the New York City Transit Authority through its subsidiary Manhattan and Bronx Surface Transit Operating Authority (MaBSTOA) in 1962 after a strike.

As the years progressed, service was eventually consolidated from multiple routes, and was given a single label, the Bx12. The route saw extensions east to City Island, seasonal service to Orchard Beach, and a branch to the Bartow-Pell Mansion in the Pelham Bay Golf Course, along with the introduction of limited-stop service on weekdays. The Orchard Beach branches were labeled Bx12A and Bx12B until July 1, 1974, when they were merged into the Bx12 designation.

On April 21, 1989, the New York City Transit Authority presented two proposals to rationalize the eastern terminals of service on the Bx12 to the MTA Board for approval. The first proposal called for the discontinuation of the summer only Bx12 Golf Course Shuttle, which ran between Orchard Beach and Pelham Bay Golf Course between 8 a.m. and 6 p.m., since it was only used by an average of ten daily passengers. This change took effect in June 1989. The second proposal up for approval was the extension of Bx12 trips that terminated at the Pelham Bay Park subway station to the new Gun Hill Depot at Bartow Avenue and the New England Thruway when it opened in September 1989. This change was intended to rationalize service and establish a relief point for bus operators. While it increased net costs, it increased operating efficiencies. In early 1990, the MTA proposed a dedicated route from City Island to Pelham Bay, the current Bx29. The Bx12 continued to run to City Island through mid-1990, but the bus routes were split by 1991. The split service pattern remains in effect today, with some minor adjustments.

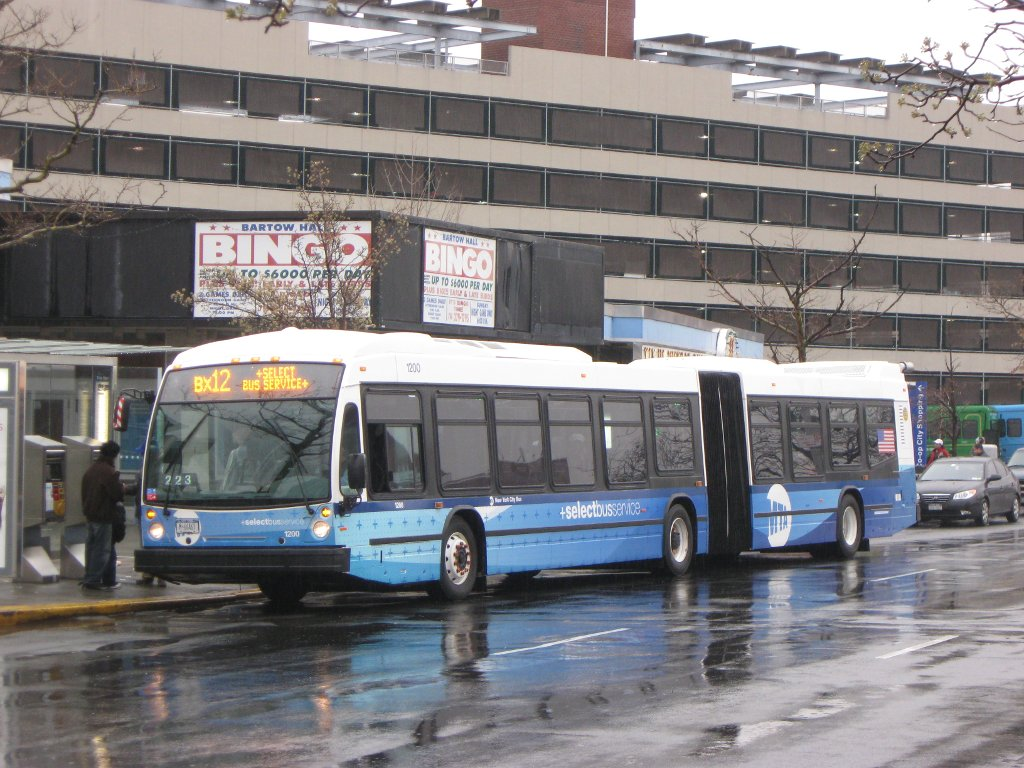
A 2009 Nova Bus LFS Articulated (1200) on the Bx12 SBS at Bartow Plaza

In 1988, due to the reconstruction of the University Heights Bridge, the Bx12 began detouring 0.5 miles (0.80 km) to cross into Manhattan via Bailey Avenue and the Broadway Bridge at 225th Street, as opposed to the direct path via 207th Street. The route was restored in September 1994 as the vehicle weight restriction on the bridge was removed. In 1989, limited-stop service began on the Bx12, saving up to five minutes per trip. In January 1995, an additional limited stop was added at Jacobi Hospital, and the hours of limited-stop service were expanded from 6:57 – 8:39 a.m. and 4:55 – 6:41 p.m. to 6:30 – 9:30 a.m. and 4 – 6:30 p.m.. Extending the span of the limited-stop service to operate all day between 7 a.m. and 7 p.m. was considered, with a plan to revisit the idea if the increase in the span of limited-stop service was successful. The span of the Bx12 was extended to operate all day between 6:30 a.m. and 7 p.m. on September 8, 1997. Exactly one year later, on September 8, 1998, the Bx12 began stopping in the Bay Plaza Shopping Center.

In 2004, the MTA in conjunction with the NYCDOT and NYSDOT, performed an initial study on bus rapid transit, with 80 corridors studied citywide. Five routes were prioritized, including the Bx12 route. On June 29, 2008, the Bx12 Limited was converted into the Bx12 Select Bus Service. Initially, during summer months Bx12 SBSs alternated between Bay Plaza and Orchard Beach. In 2009, Bx12 locals were extended to Orchard Beach during summer months, with all SBSs terminating at Bay Plaza. Summer local service to Inwood was also added at this time. The total ridership in 2009 was 14,736,515, ranking the route third in ridership citywide and the busiest in the Bronx. In 2010, the high-floor articulated buses on the SBS route were replaced with low-floor articulated buses to improve boarding and alighting of passengers.
