= Bx41 (New York City bus) =

Bus route in the Bronx, New York

bx41 bx41
- Melrose/Webster Avenue
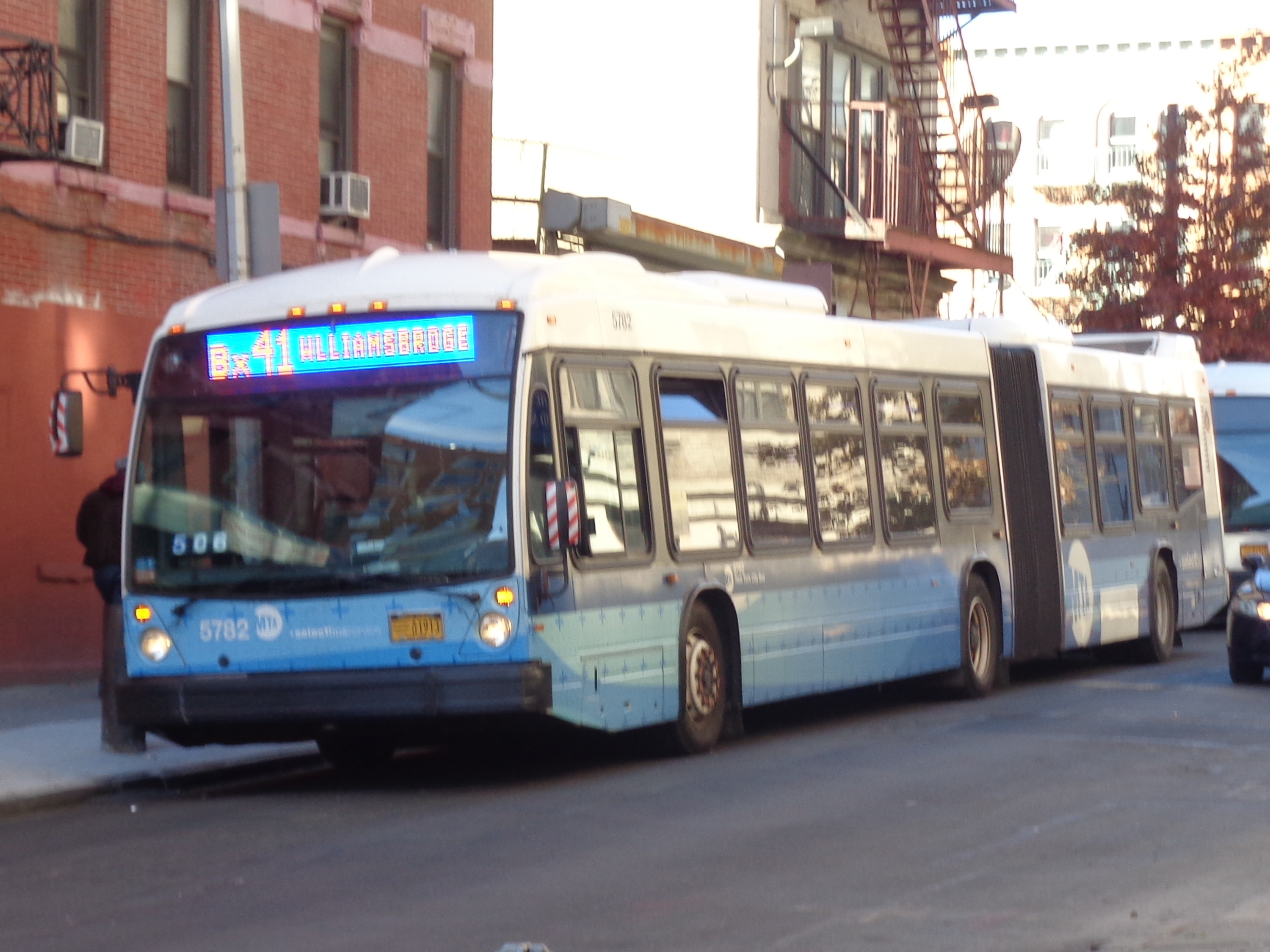
- A 2011 Nova Bus LFS Articulated (5782) on the Bx41 SBS at The Hub (East 148th St/3rd Ave), just about to leave for Williamsbridge. This wrap has been removed.

Overview
- System: MTA Regional Bus Operations
- Operator: Manhattan and Bronx Surface Transit Operating Authority
- Garage: Gun Hill Depot
- Vehicle: Nova Bus LFS articulated (main vehicle); New Flyer Xcelsior XD60 (local main; SBS supplemental); Nova Bus LFS; Nova Bus LFS HEV; New Flyer Xcelsior XD40 (supplemental service)
- Began service: June 27, 1948 (Bx41); June 30, 2013 (Bx41 SBS)

Route
- Locale: The Bronx, New York, U.S.
- Landmarks served: The Hub, Bronx Borough Courthouse, Fordham Plaza, Fordham University, New York Botanical Garden
- Start: The Hub - E 149th Street & Third Avenue
- Via: Melrose Avenue, Webster Avenue
- End: Williamsbridge - White Plains Road & Gun Hill Road
- Length: 5.3 miles (8.5 km)
- Other routes: Bx15 3rd Ave

Service
- Operates: 24 hours (Bx41); All times except late nights (Bx41 SBS)
- Ridership: 2,422,776 (2025)
- Transfers: Yes
- Timetable: Bx41 Bx41-SBS

The Bx41 is a public transit line in New York City. It runs within the borough of the Bronx, operating along Melrose and Webster Avenue.

The Bx41 replaced the Webster and White Plains Avenues Line streetcars in 1948. It started at the south end of the Bronx in Mott Haven and continued north to the northern end of the Bronx at Wakefield. It was the longest north-south line in the borough at the time, running nearly 8.4 miles (13.5 km), ending near the borders of Harlem in Manhattan and Mount Vernon in Westchester County until its current configuration in 2010. The bus line became the second bus rapid transit route to enter service in the Bronx, replacing Limited service with Select Bus Service in June 2013.

== Route description ==
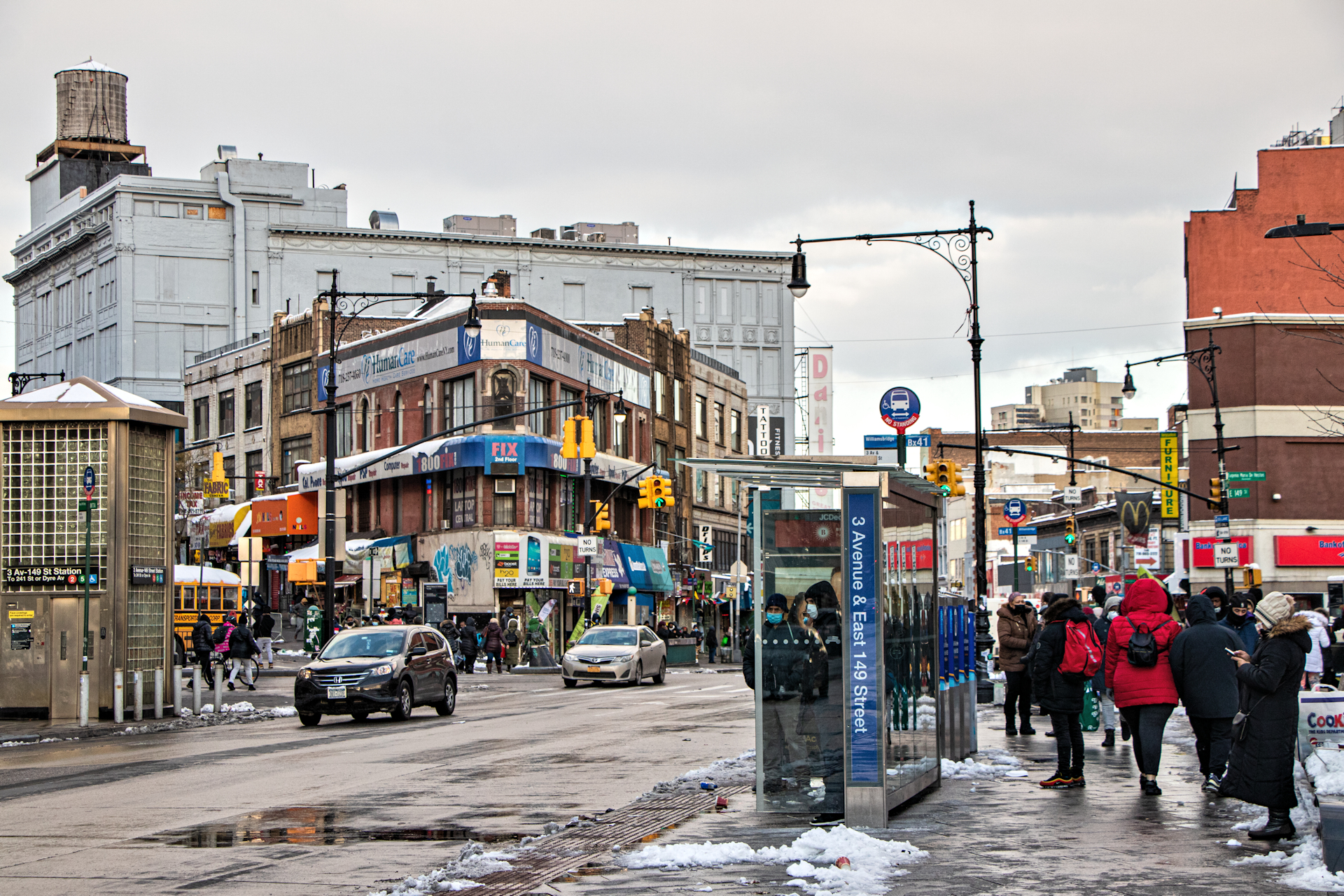
Bx41 Williamsbridge stops at The Hub on Third Avenue

The Bx41 begins service at Third Avenue and East 149th Street. Buses that terminate here drop off at Melrose Avenue and East 149th Street and continue south in a counterclockwise loop, using East 149th Street, Courtlandt Avenue and East 148th Street before assuming layover. This loop was added around 2008 after a reconstruction project that modified traffic in the area and to reduce traffic along Third Avenue, which many bus routes use. Heading northbound, buses turn left onto Third Avenue to pick up passengers before heading north to East 152nd Street, where it turns left to continue north via Melrose Avenue. North of Melrose, Melrose Avenue becomes Webster Avenue, and the Bx41 continues north along Webster Avenue until Gun Hill Road, where it turns right to serve the Gun Hill Road station at White Plains Road. Local buses terminate on the local street, while the Select Bus Service route has a dedicated terminal outside the station.

=== Select Bus Service Stops ===
| Station Street traveled | Direction | Connections |
|---|---|---|
| The Hub East 149th Street Melrose Avenue | Southbound terminus | NYCT Bus: Bx2, Bx4, Bx15, Bx19, Bx21, Bx41 Local, M125; NYC Subway: trains at Third Avenue–149th Street |
| East 148th Street Third Avenue | Northbound station | NYCT Bus: Bx2, Bx4, Bx15, Bx19, Bx21, Bx41 Local, M125; NYC Subway: trains at Third Avenue–149th Street |
| East 160th/162nd Streets Melrose Avenue | Bidirectional | NYCT Bus: Bx6, Bx6 SBS, Bx13, Bx41 Local; Metro-North: Harlem Line at Melrose (two blocks west on Park Avenue) |
| East 167th Street Webster Avenue | Bidirectional | NYCT Bus: Bx35, Bx41 Local |
| East 170th Street Webster Avenue | Bidirectional | NYCT Bus: Bx41 Local |
| Claremont Parkway Webster Avenue | Bidirectional | NYCT Bus: Bx11, Bx41 Local |
| East Tremont Avenue Webster Avenue | Bidirectional | NYCT Bus: Bx36, Bx41 Local; Metro-North: Harlem Line at Tremont (one block east on Park Avenue) |
| East 180th Street Webster Avenue | Bidirectional | NYCT Bus: Bx40, Bx41 Local, Bx42 |
| East Fordham Road Fordham Plaza, Fordham University Webster Avenue | Bidirectional | NYCT Bus: Bx9, Bx12, Bx12 SBS, Bx15, Bx17, Bx22, Bx41 Local; Metro-North: Harlem Line and New Haven Line at Fordham; Bee-Line: 60, 61, 62 |
| Bedford Park Boulevard Botanical Garden Webster Avenue | Bidirectional | NYCT Bus: Bx25, Bx26, Bx41 Local; Metro-North: Harlem Line at Botanical Garden |
| East 204th Street Webster Avenue | Bidirectional | NYCT Bus: Bx41 Local |
| East Gun Hill Road Webster Avenue | Bidirectional | NYCT Bus: Bx28, Bx38, Bx41 Local |
| Williamsbridge East Gun Hill Road White Plains Road | Southbound station, northbound terminus | MTA Bus: BxM11; NYCT Bus: Bx28, Bx38, Bx39, Bx41 Local; NYC Subway: trains at Gun Hill Road |

=== School trippers ===
When school is in session, one local bus departs near Validus Preparatory Academy and two other schools at Claremont Parkway & Third Avenue at 3:15pm. This trip heads to Webster Avenue via Claremont Parkway and operates the rest of its northbound route.

== History ==
=== Early history ===
The Bx41 bus replaced the Webster and White Plains Avenues Line streetcars on June 27, 1948. The original south-western terminus was at Mott Haven-Third Avenue/East 141st Street. Service was extended to Lincoln Avenue-East 136th Street (near the Third Avenue–138th Street station) in July 1974.

=== Introduction of limited-stop service ===
Rush-hour Limited-Stop service was introduced on September 11, 1995, operating on weekdays between 6:45 and 9 a.m. and between 3:45 and 6:15 p.m, and making limited stops between East 211th Street and East 138th Street.

In December 1999, the MTA announced a proposed change to service between Third Avenue and East 138th Street and East 134th Street and Alexander Avenue to enable the dispatcher at East 138th Street to better supervise service on the route, and to avoid traffic near Bruckner Boulevard. Bx41 would now share a terminal with the Bx21 and Bx32 at Lincoln Avenue and East 138th Street. After stopping at East 138th Street on Third Avenue, southbound service had previously run south on Lincoln Avenue and east along East 134th Street to its terminal. Northbound service continued east on East 134th Street, north on Alexander Avenue, west on East 135th Street, and north along Lincoln and Third Avenues. Only 100 daily riders alighted and only 200 daily riders boarded in the discontinued segment south of East 136th Street. The change was expected to save $50,000 a year. The change would take effect in early 2000. Shortly after, the MTA announced a proposed revision in the route's terminal loop at East 241st Street and Baychester Avenue. Instead of making a U-turn to head back west on East 241st Street and head south on White Plains Road, northbound buses would turn east White Plains Road at East 238th Street (Nereid Avenue), and then north onto Baychester Avenue before merging onto East 241st Street. The terminal would be moved from the south side of East 241st Street at Baychester Avenue to the north side of East 241st Street at Cranford Avenue. Two northbound bus stops on White Plains Road at East 239th Street and East 240th Street would be discontinued. This not only got rid of a difficult U-turn, but also helped improved reliability as the Bx41 was converted from a 40 feet (12 m) route to a 60 feet (18 m) Articulated bus route. The change would take effect in fall 2000.

In March 2002, a plan to revise service on the Bx1, Bx2, and Bx41 routes in Mott Haven by extending the Bx1 and Bx2 to a new terminal at Lincoln Avenue and East 138th Street and truncating the Bx41 to East 149th Street and Third Avenue was announced. The Bx41 would have a terminal loop consisting of Third Avenue, East 146th Street, Willis Avenue, East 147th Street, and Third Avenue. At the time, the Bx1 had terminated at the 138th Street–Grand Concourse subway station, while the Bx2 had terminated at East 147th Street and Third Avenue near the Third Avenue–149th Street subway station. The changes were intended to improve service reliability on the Bx1 and Bx2 by consolidating route supervision at their new terminal. There was no dispatcher at Grand Concourse and East 138th Street, and without full supervision, trips were often out of order when they merged at Grand Concourse and East 165th Street. The truncation of the Bx41 made the changes cost-neutral and ensured there would not be too many buses in the vicinity of East 138th Street and Lincoln Avenue. About 1,000 Bx41 daily riders would need to transfer with the changes. The changes took effect on September 8, 2002.

24/7 service on the Bx41 began in November 2005, giving it late night service for the first time.

On August 16, 2008, Bx41 service were rerouted in The Hub due to the reconstruction of streets by the New York City Department of Transportation to improve pedestrian safety. Northbound Bx41 service would run north on Third Avenue, west on East 152nd Street, and north on Melrose Avenue before resuming its previous route, while southbound service would run south on Melrose Avenue, east on East 154th Street, south on Elton Avenue, and then south on Third Avenue before resuming its previous route. Southbound service was slightly modified and moved back to Melrose Avenue shortly after due to heavy congestion along Third Avenue.

In June 2010, service was later cut back from 241st Street to Gun Hill Road due to budget-related service reductions, and was replaced by extended Bx39 service.

=== Proposed expansions and conversion to Select Bus Service ===
Beginning in 2008, there were plans to improve service along the Webster Avenue Corridor. One plan was to introduce a new Bx50 between Fordham Plaza and LaGuardia Airport. This would replace the Bx41 limited south of Fordham Plaza, as well as supplement the M60 bus in Queens. Many airport riders use the M60 and transfer in Harlem to the subway for service in the Bronx, and the Bx50 was proposed to relieve congestion from the M60. The plan was pushed back in June 2010 due to budget cuts and was proposed again shortly after as part of the LaGuardia Airport Access Alternatives Analysis. No further studies for an extension to LaGuardia Airport have been made as of September 2023.

In 2009, as part of Phase II of the MTA and New York City Department of Transportation (DOT)'s Select Bus Service (SBS), both the Third Avenue and Webster Avenue bus corridors were studied for the implementation of a north-to-south bus rapid transit service through the South Bronx. The Bx41 along Webster Avenue was chosen for Select Bus Service since it would serve more riders and was wider, making it easier to accommodate bus lanes. In April 2013, the MTA Board approved the planned replacement of limited-stop service with Select Bus Service. The Bx41 SBS would make all the same stops as limited-stop service except for northbound stops at 189th Street and Westchester Avenue. Bx41 SBS service would use a new off-street stop at the Gun Hill Intermodal Terminal to improve the connection to the subway. The span of service would increase from being peak-hour-only to operating between 6 a.m. and 9:30 p.m.. Service on the Bx41 would increased 30 percent on weekdays, 22 percent on Saturdays, and 51 percent on Sundays. Offset bus lanes were installed between East 165th Street and East Gun Hill Road. The Bx41 changes took effect on June 30, 2013. The implementation of Bx41 SBS increased operating costs by $1.28 million a year, including $700,000 in cost savings from replacing the Bx55 with the Bx41 Select Bus Service and newly implemented Bx15 Limited.

== Incidents ==
On November 16, 2018, a Bx41 bus was going northbound on Webster Avenue when it crashed into the back of a fire truck. The firefighters were responding to an emergency in Mount Hope when their truck got hit as it turned left from East 175th Street. The bus operator, twenty passengers, and all firefighters aboard the fire truck were injured.
