= Fordham station =

Metro-North Railroad station in the Bronx, New York

Fordham
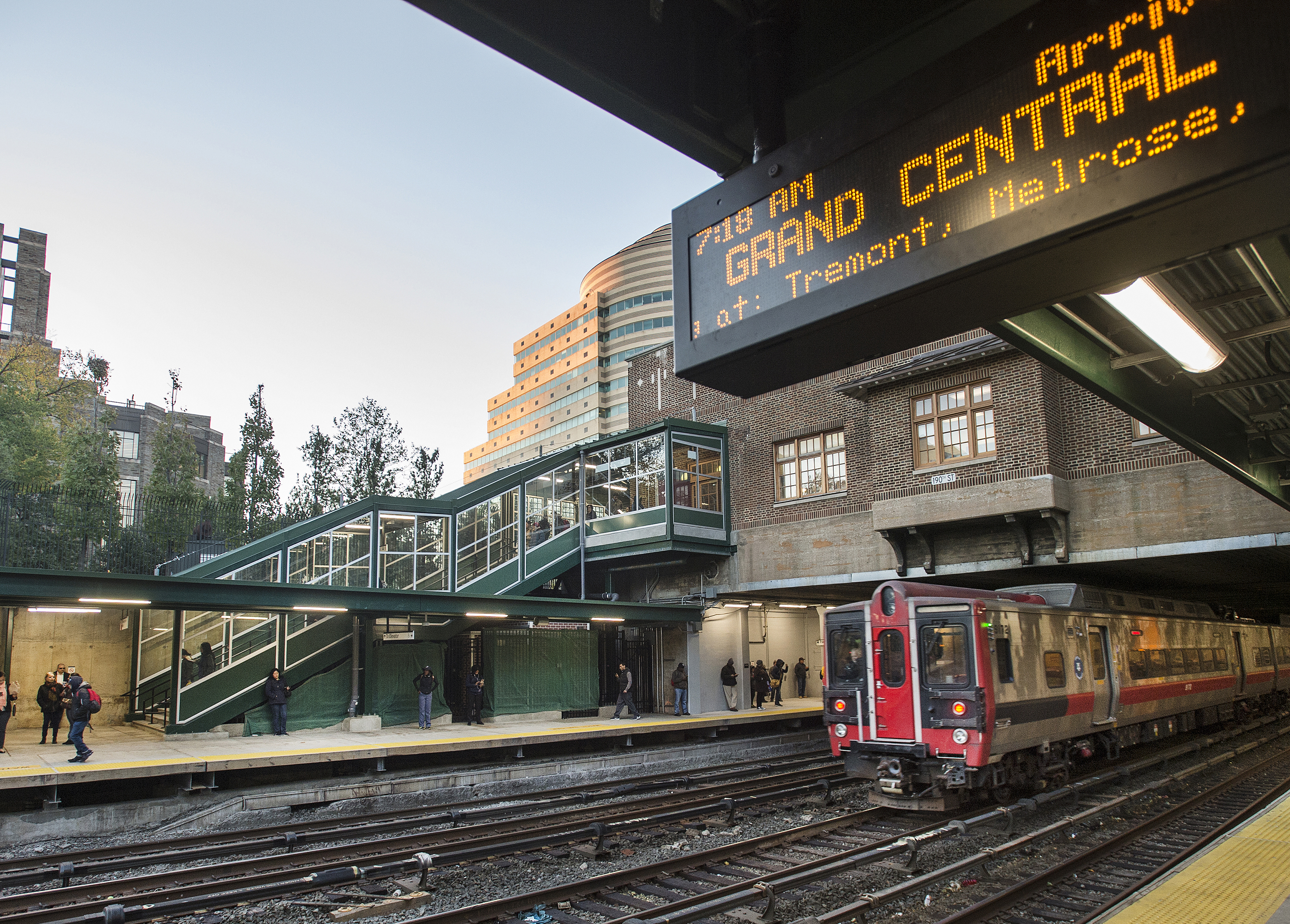
- A New Haven Line train passing through Fordham

General information
- Location: 417 East Fordham Road; Fordham, Bronx, New York
- Coordinates: 40.861534°N 73.890561°W
- Line: Harlem Line
- Platforms: 2 side platforms
- Tracks: 4
- Connections: New York City Bus: Bx9, Bx12, Bx12 SBS, Bx15, Bx17, Bx22, Bx41, Bx41 SBS; Bee-Line Bus System: 60, 61, 62

Construction
- Accessible: yes

Other information
- Fare zone: 2

History
- Opened: March 1, 1841
- Electrified: 700V (DC) third rail

Passengers
- 2018: 6,746 (Metro-North)
- Rank: 4 of 109

Services
Preceding station	Metro-North Railroad	Following station
Tremont toward Grand Central	Harlem Line	Botanical Garden toward North White Plains
Harlem–125th Street toward Grand Central	New Haven Line	Mount Vernon East toward Stamford
Former services
Preceding station	New York Central Railroad	Following station
183rd Street toward New York	Harlem Division	Botanical Garden toward Chatham
Location

Fordham station, also known as Fordham–East 190th Street station, is a commuter rail station located at Fordham Plaza in the Bronx, New York City. It is served by the Harlem Line and New Haven Line of the Metro-North Railroad system. The station has two below-ground side platforms, long enough to serve eight cars, on the outer tracks of the four-track mainline. The station building sits above the tracks on the Fordham Road (East 190th Street) overpass, and still bears the name New York Central Railroad on its facade. The station is among the busiest rail stations in the Bronx.

== Service ==
Most service is provided to Grand Central Terminal by local Harlem Line trains from and to North White Plains. These trains run at least every half-hour. However, during the reverse peak (outbound mornings and inbound evenings), express trains to and from Southeast also serve the station. On early weekend mornings and late evenings, a few express trains to and from Southeast stop here as well.

The station is partially served by off-peak local New Haven Line trains to and from Stamford and some peak trains. It is the only station in the Bronx that New Haven Line trains serve daily. Until 2019, New Haven Line trains to Grand Central could only discharge passengers while trains to Connecticut could only pick up passengers. Those going to and from Manhattan had to use the Harlem Line. This is due to Metro-North's operating agreement with the Connecticut Department of Transportation (CDOT), which dates to the 19th century. Beginning April 14, 2019, passengers heading to and from Manhattan can also travel on New Haven Line trains. This was a result of an agreement reached with CDOT, under which revenue from tickets between Fordham and Manhattan would be split between Metro-North and CDOT.

The Fordham station is the busiest reverse-peak commutation station in the United States. Over 3,000 passengers travel outbound on an average weekday, more than ten times the reverse-peak-commuter number in 1982. In addition, it is the busiest Metro-North station in the Bronx and the third-busiest station outside Manhattan.

== Station layout ==
The station is adjacent to the western end of the Rose Hill campus of Fordham University. It is part of the Fordham Plaza complex, served by several MTA and Bee-Line bus routes that operate through the Bronx and Westchester County. The station has two high-level side platforms, each eight cars long, serving the outer tracks of the four-track line. Both are accessible via stairways from the station building and from Fordham Plaza. There are also elevators from each platform to the station building.

The Fordham Plaza Bus Terminal is located on the south side of East Fordham Road, across from the headhouse. It is a terminal for routes serving the Bronx and southern Westchester County:

- New York City Bus: Bx9, Bx12, Bx12 SBS, Bx15, Bx17, Bx22, Bx41, Bx41 SBS
- MTA Bus: BxM4
- Bee-Line Bus: 60, 61, 62

== History ==
The New York and Harlem Railroad laid tracks through Fordham as far back as 1841, and a station is known to have existed shortly afterwards. The New York and Harlem was bought by the New York Central and Hudson River Railroad in 1864. A March 17, 1848, agreement gave the New York and New Haven Railroad trackage rights over the NY&H from Williamsbridge south into New York City. NY&NH was merged with the Hartford and New Haven Railroad to form the New York, New Haven and Hartford Railroad in 1872, and the trackage rights along the Harlem Division remained intact. This aspect of the line would prove to be of little importance to the station until the next century. Throughout the late-19th Century, the Harlem Division was widened and rebuilt into an open cut line as part of a grade elimination project, and Fordham Station was one of several in the Bronx that were rebuilt with a station house on a bridge over all four tracks, including Melrose, the former Morrisania and Tremont stations. The reconstruction of the Harlem Line in this area lead to the creation of Fordham Plaza.

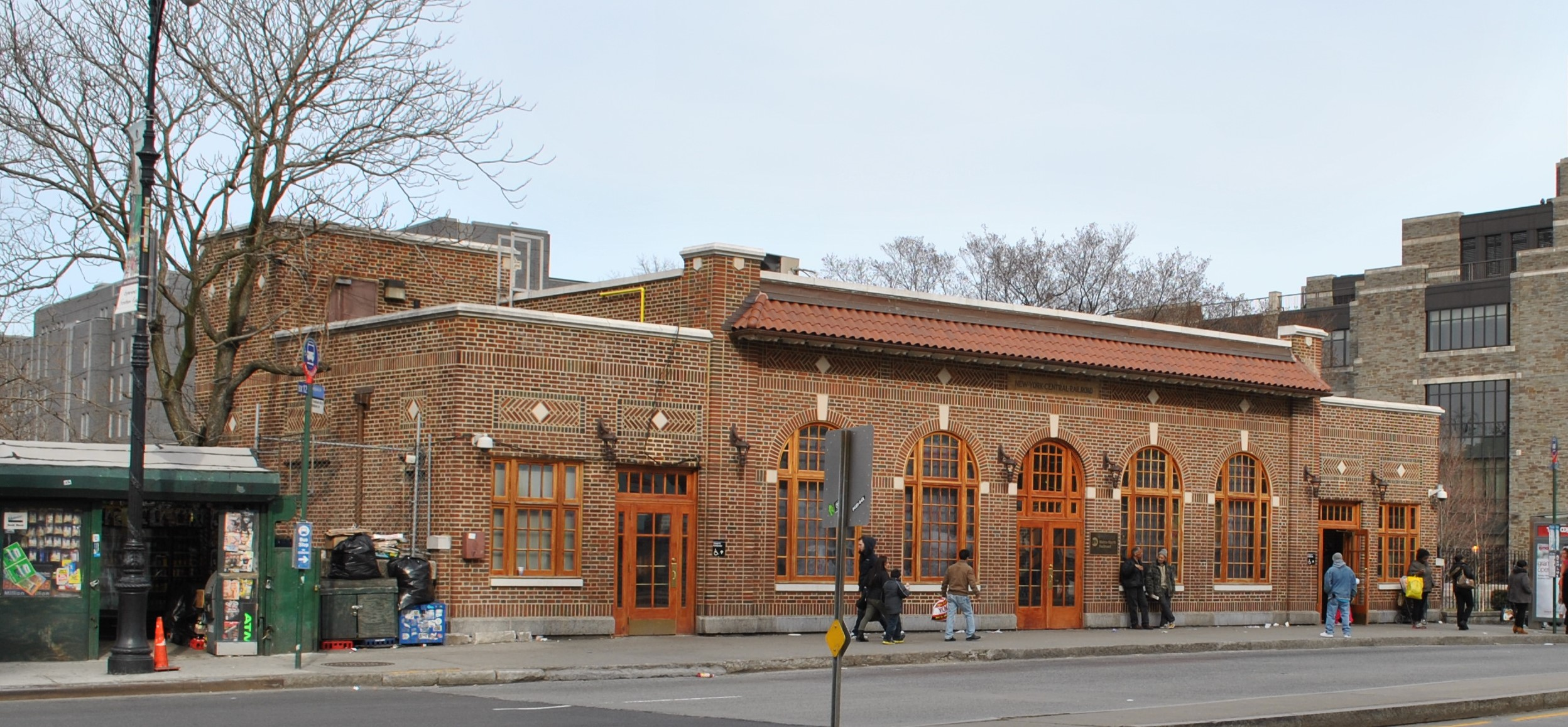
The station building in 2013

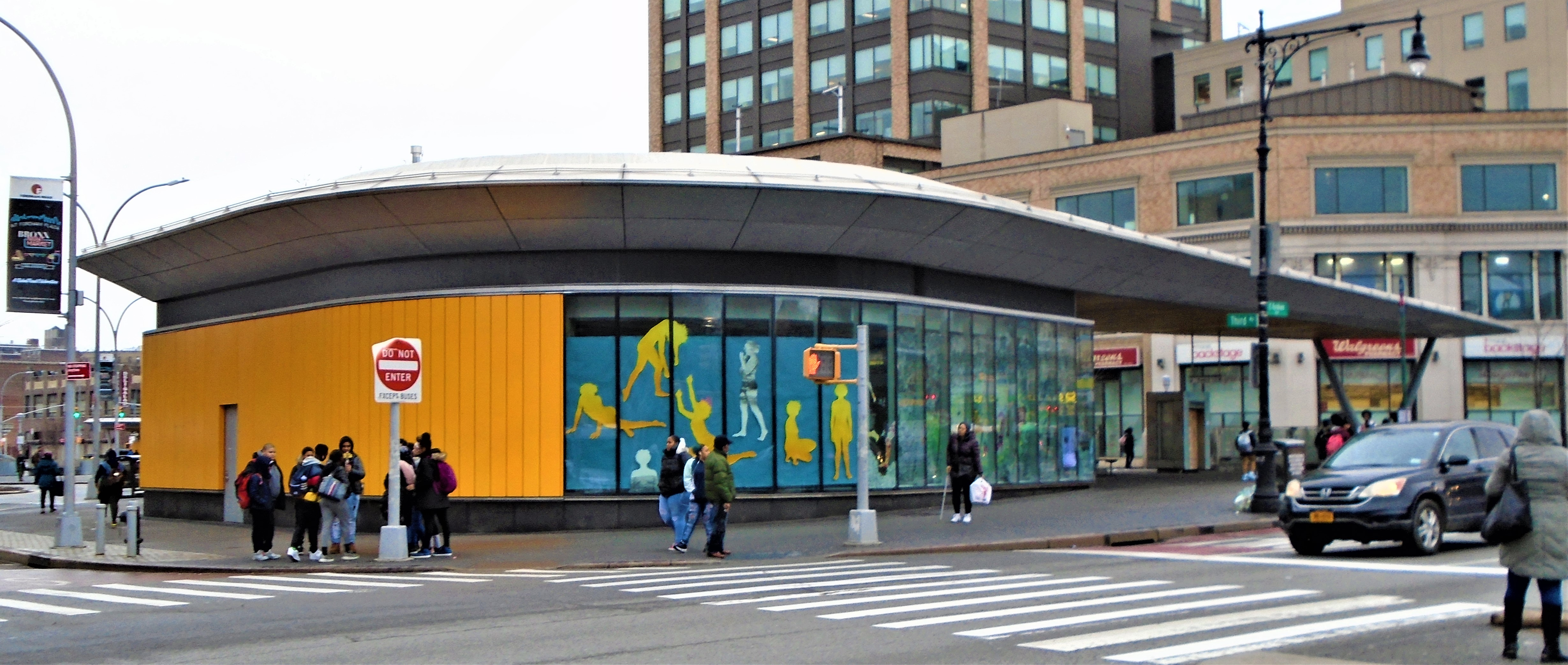
The new Fordham Plaza entrance, across Fordham Road from the station building, in 2020

Two major milestones of the early 20th Century brought an increase in ridership to the station. The Metropolitan Elevated Railway (later acquired by the Interborough Rapid Transit Company) extended the Third Avenue Elevated Line to Fordham Station, bringing a rapid transit connection on July 1, 1901. Pelham Avenue station was the northern terminus of the line until it was extended to Bronx Park Terminal ten months later. As a result, the Third Avenue Railway also began to operate from Fordham Plaza converting it into the major transit hub that it is to this day. Due to the popularity of football games between the Fordham Rams and Yale Bulldogs in the 1920s, joint service between the New York Central Railroad and New York, New Haven and Hartford was moved from Woodlawn station to Fordham, where it remains.

As with other NYC stations in the Bronx, the station became a Penn Central station once the NYC & Pennsylvania Railroads merged in 1968. Penn Central acquired the New Haven Railroad in 1969, thus transforming the station into a full Penn Central station. However, because of the railroad's serious financial distress following the merger, commuter service was turned over to the Metropolitan Transportation Authority in 1972. To make matters worse, the connection to the Fordham Road–190th Street station as well as the rest of the IRT Third Avenue Line was eliminated in 1973, although the station still had a major mass transit connection in the form of Fordham Plaza.

The station and the railroad were turned over to Conrail on April 1, 1976. On September 1, 1976, New Haven Line trains began stopping at Fordham as part of regular service, with three trains stopping in each direction. The station and both lines became part of the MTA's Metro-North Railroad in 1983. Metro-North extended the platforms to handle longer trains in the 1990s, and removed the luncheonette and other local businesses that operated from the station.

Major changes to Fordham station were completed on November 22, 2016. The renovation's scope included a new entrance leading directly to Webster Avenue and 193rd Street, a new permanent artwork, and a rebuilt northbound platform. The northbound platform was widened from being just under ten feet wide to being 19 feet wide. This was made possible with the acquisition of property from Fordham University. At the north end of the southbound platform a ramp was installed. Both platforms received rehabilitated elevators, new LED lighting, new benches and canopies, real-time information monitors, and public address systems.

In 2018, work was completed on a new interlocking to the north of the station, which was expected to increase reliability and capacity on the line. This project cost $29.9 million.
