= Fordham Plaza, Bronx =

Commercial area in New York City

Fordham Plaza
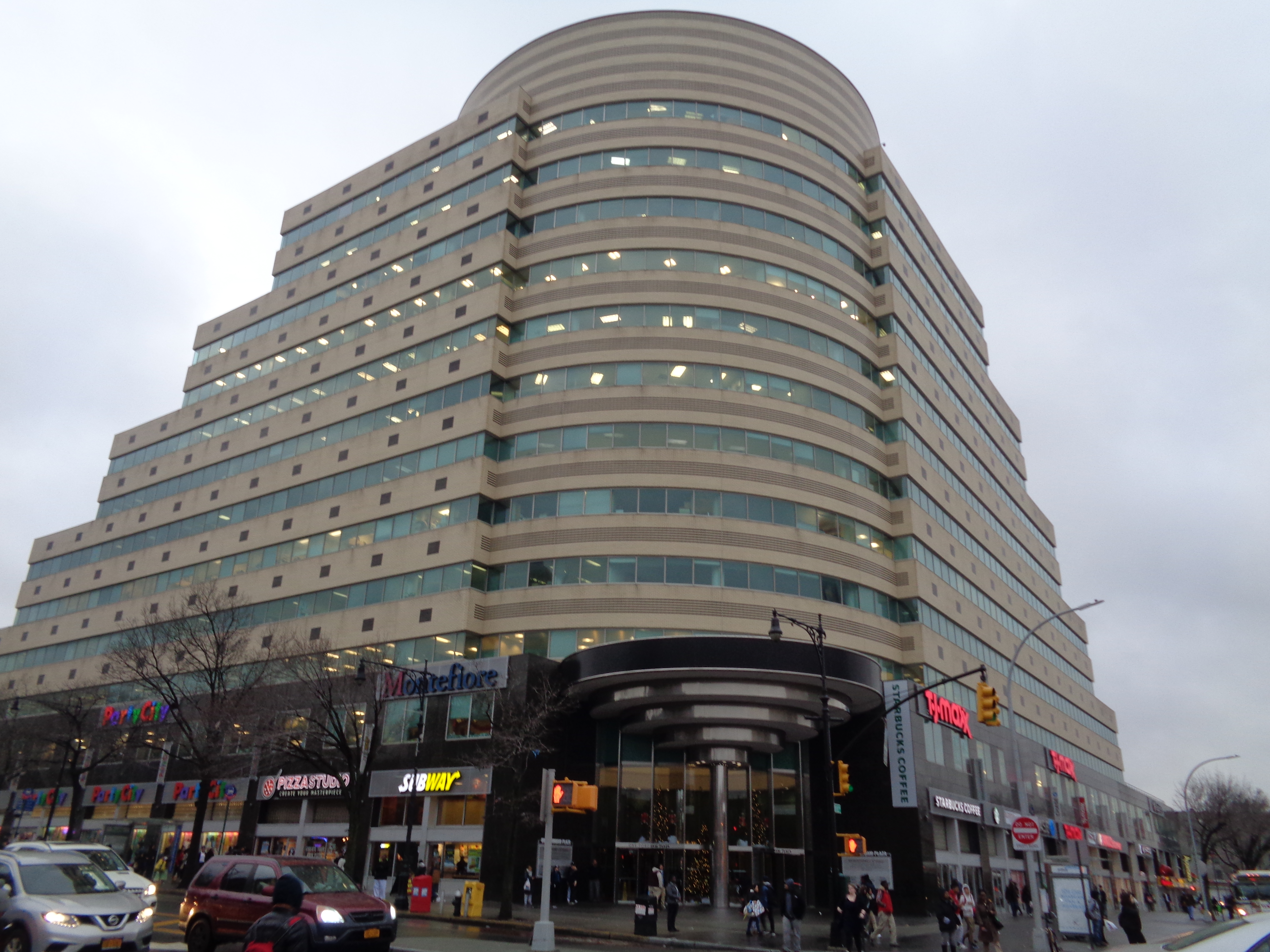
- One Fordham Plaza
- Interactive map of Fordham Plaza
- Coordinates: 40.861°N 73.891°W
- Locale: Belmont and Fordham, Bronx, New York
- Rail services: Harlem Line New Haven Line
- Bus routes: New York City Bus: Bx9, Bx12, Bx12 SBS, Bx15, Bx17, Bx22, Bx34, Bx41, Bx41 SBS; Bee-Line Bus System: B-L60, B-L61, B-L62

Fordham Plaza, originally known as Fordham Square, is a major commercial and transportation hub in the Fordham and Belmont neighborhoods of the Bronx in New York City, New York, United States. It is located on the south side of Fordham Road at Third and Webster Avenues, at the eastern end of the commercial strip along Fordham Road ("Fordham Center") that runs past Grand Concourse and Jerome Avenue to about Grand Avenue, and to the west of the Bronx's Little Italy district on Arthur Avenue in Belmont.

The plaza is located across from Fordham University's Rose Hill campus, and above the Fordham station of the Metro-North Railroad. The Fordham Plaza name refers specifically to two locations in the area: the office building One Fordham Plaza on the east side of Third Avenue; and the Fordham Plaza Bus Terminal, a bus loop and pedestrian plaza on the west side above the station. It along with the rest of the Fordham Road commercial district constitutes the largest shopping strip in the Bronx, and the third largest in New York City.

== Location ==
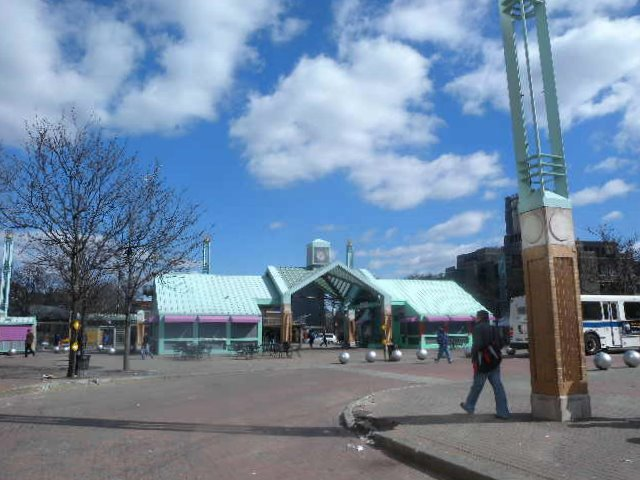
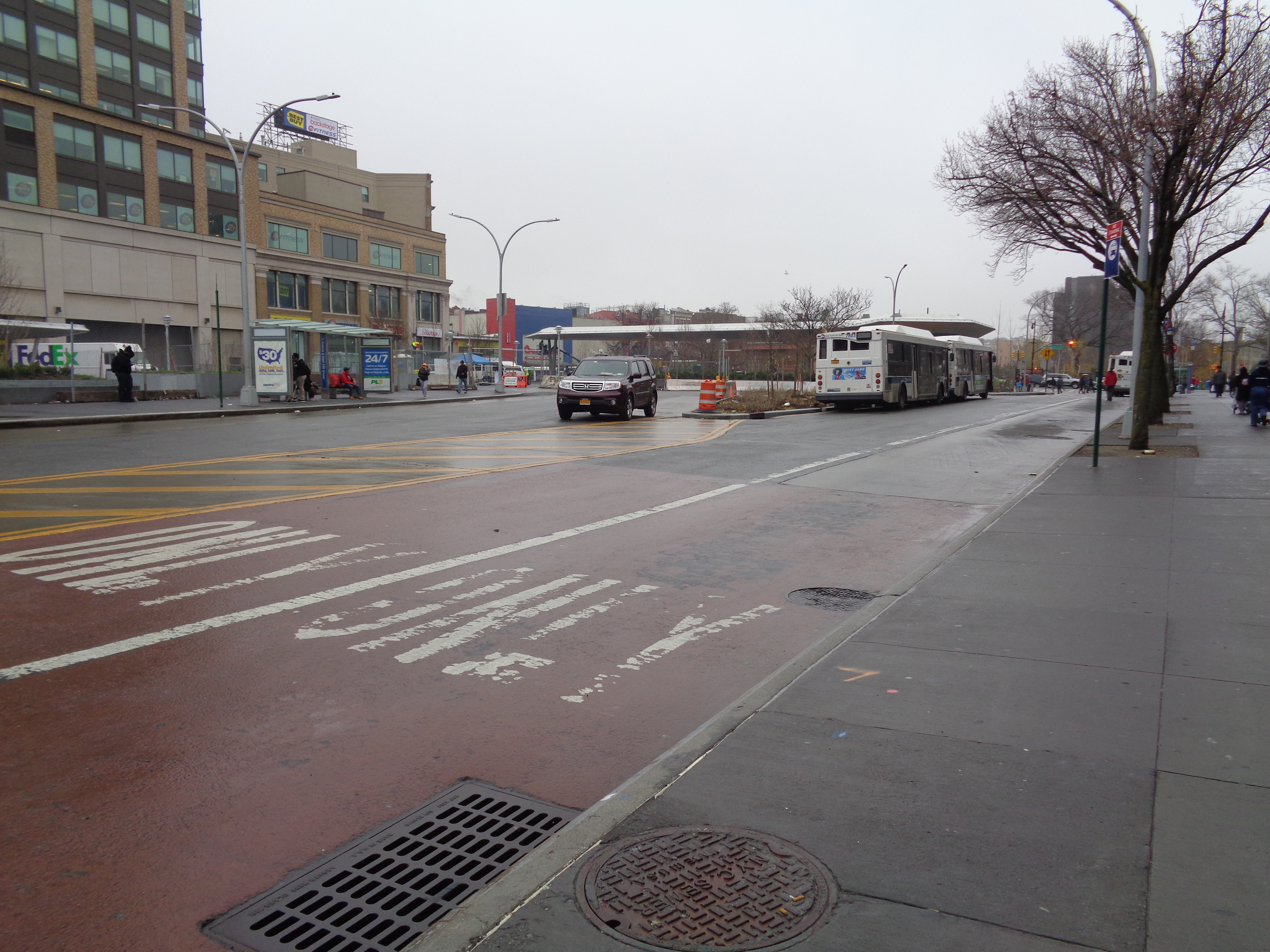
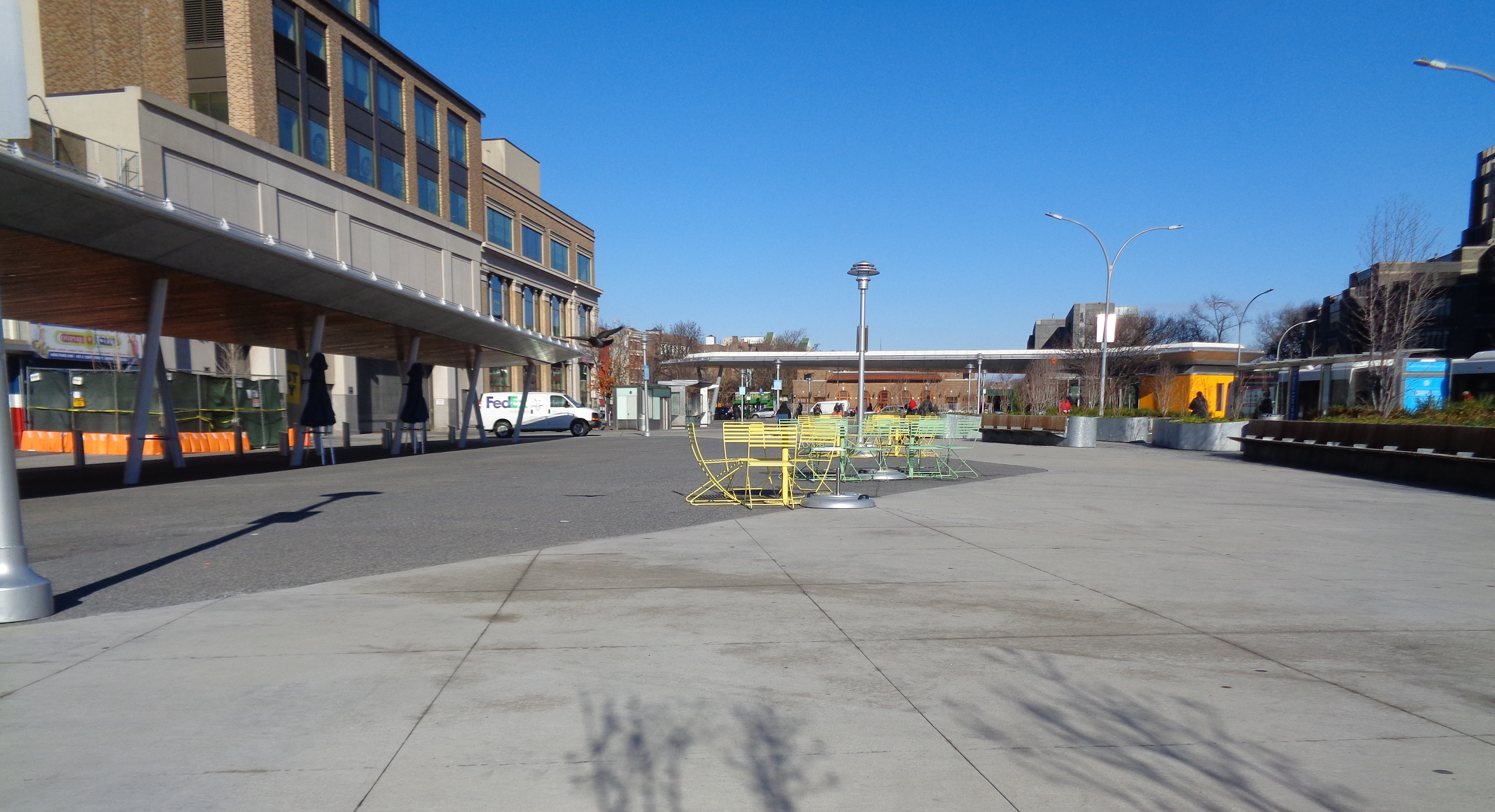
The Fordham Bus Plaza, in 2011 (top) prior to renovations, in 2015 (middle) after the first phase of the project which opened the bus loop, and in 2016 (bottom) following the opening of the new pedestrian plaza.

The name "Fordham Plaza" refers to a two-block-long area on the south side of Fordham Road between Webster Avenue to the west and Washington Avenue to the east. The area is bounded to the south by East 189th Street. Third Avenue runs up the middle of the area to Fordham Road; Park Avenue formerly ran north through the plaza as well, but currently ends at 189th Street.

=== Fordham Place and One Fordham Plaza ===
There are two primary structures on the site. On the southeast corner of Fordham Road and Webster Avenue is Fordham Place (400 East Fordham Road), a brick structure occupying half of the western block. Existing since the 1910s, it is owned by Retail Properties of America, Inc., and consists of a 7-story building and an adjacent 14-story building with mixed retail and office use. Several stores occupy the complex, including a Best Buy location and, until 2014, a Sears location (leading to the nickname of the "Sears Building"), which has since been leased by Macy's. It was previously known as the Roger's Building, for the Rogers and Sons Department Store that preceded Sears.

The second building is One Fordham Plaza (also stylized as 1 Fordham Plaza), a 14-story office complex which occupies the entire eastern block on Fordham Road and Washington Avenue. The building was designed by the Skidmore, Owings & Merrill firm, and architect Raul de Armas. It is L-shaped, with sides along Fordham Road and Third Avenue. It is constructed in a "layer-cake" or "ziggurat" design with yellow stone, black marble, and polished chrome. The two sides meet at a domed structure at the corner of Fordham Road and Third Avenue. Its architectural style has been described as "Neo Art Deco" or "post-modern". Opened in 1986 and owned by Chase Enterprises, it also features stores on its lower levels including a TJ Maxx, the Family Health Center for Montefiore Medical Center, the Union Health Care Center for the New York City Housing Authority run by St. Barnabas Hospital, and a multi-level parking garage.

=== Bus terminal ===
In between the two buildings is the Fordham Plaza Bus Terminal (4750 Third Avenue), encompassing Third Avenue and the former right-of-way of Park Avenue on a "bridge-structure" over the Metro-North Railroad tracks. From 1997 to early 2013, this was also the location of a cobblestone-paved outdoor market space. This included tents and stands for items such as fruit. At its north end were two concession stands built into the southern entrance stairs to the Metro-North station. Throughout the plaza were several obelisk-like pillars, some of which were combined with canopies and glass bricks to form bus shelters.

The market area, concession stands, and the remainder of Park Avenue in the Plaza (used only for bus turnarounds and layovers, as well as local deliveries to Fordham Place) were demolished as part of the "Fordham Plaza Reconstruction Project" from 2013 to 2016. The renovation, designed by Grimshaw Architects, constructed a bus loop on Third Avenue (used to turn Bx15 buses) and closed the street to all traffic except buses. It also replaced the concession stand with a cafe and canopy over the Metro-North stairs. A second canopy with food kiosks was constructed at the south end of the plaza. Several PlaNYC wayfinding signs were also installed.

=== Fordham University ===
Located across from the plaza to the north is Fordham University's Rose Hill campus and its associated William D. Walsh Family Library and Fordham Preparatory School. Across Washington Avenue to the east is Theodore Roosevelt Educational Campus (formerly Theodore Roosevelt High School). The Bronx Library Center of the New York Public Library is located nearby at Kingsbridge Road. The plaza is located near several attractions of Bronx Park, including the New York Botanical Garden and the Bronx Zoo. Fordham Plaza is part of the Fordham Road Business Improvement District, which extends west to around Jerome Avenue past Grand Concourse and includes much of the "Fordham Center" commercial district.

== History ==
=== Previous development ===
In the 1840s, what is now the intersection of Fordham Road and Webster Avenue was a rural junction in the town of West Farms, characterized by farmland and cottages with a few small businesses. At the site of Fordham Plaza at Washington Avenue was the Powell Farm House, the oldest residence in the neighborhood which was built at the turn of the 19th Century as part of the Union Hill Farm. A boarding school was also present on the farm grounds. Originally owned by the Bayard family, it came under the control of Rev. William Powell in 1830. Powell, who started the boarding school, was the founder of the St. Peter's Church, Chapel and Cemetery Complex in then-Westchester County (now Westchester Square, Bronx). At the northwest corner of the Fordham Road-Webster Avenue intersection was Nolan's Hotel, said to have been visited by George Washington, and frequented by local Fordham resident Edgar Allan Poe.

Major development in the area began with the opening of St. John's College (now Fordham University) in 1841. Beginning in 1849, after Powell's death, the estate was broken up, with a small triangle of land at Third Avenue, Washington Avenue, and 188th Street going to the city to become the Flood Triangle park. A station on the New York and Harlem Railroad (now the Harlem Line of the Metro-North) at this location was constructed by 1850. In 1899 and 1902 respectively, the Bronx Zoo and the New York Botanical Garden were opened on the former eastern grounds of St. John's College. The Third Avenue El was extended to a new terminal at Fordham Road (then Pelham Avenue) in 1901, while streetcar service in the area was introduced during the late 19th and early 20th Centuries. Streetcar lines included the 207th Street Crosstown Line along Fordham Road, the Willis Avenue Line along Third Avenue, and the Webster and White Plains Avenues Line along Webster Avenue. Because of these developments, the area's population exploded, and Fordham Road evolved into a major commercial district by the early 1900s.

=== Creation and early years ===
Plans to create Fordham Plaza as a park or development were proposed around 1911. At the time, much of the property in the area was owned by the New York Edison Company (now Con Edison). A political headquarters for the Tammany Hall political party, the North End Democratic Club, was also located in the area. The area was known as Fordham Square, which was also the name of the park at the northeast corner of Fordham Road and Webster Avenue (today's Rose Hill Park).

In 1912, the city municipal engineers released plans to construct a plaza between Third and Park Avenues south of Fordham Road. This would involve removing the wooden bridge at Fordham Road across the railroad tracks, and covering the then-open-cut railroad tracks between Fordham Road and Welch Street (East 189th Street) to create the plaza. In September 1916, the Francis Rogers & Sons Department Store purchased the block on Fordham Road and Webster Avenue, then occupied by twenty two-story stores and office buildings, to build what would become 400 East Fordham Road. It was the company's second location in the borough; the other was in what is now The Hub. The new store opened in 1919.

The plaza was built in the 1920s in conjunction with the reconstruction of the railroad station, which was completed by 1926. A 1938 map shows the name "Fordham Plaza" identifying the current plaza area above the Metro-North tracks. In 1943, the area was rezoned from a business district to a retail district in an effort to make it the "Times Square of the Bronx".

In the 1940s and again in the 1960s, the United States Postal Service (USPS) sought land for a new post office site to serve as the central facility for the Bronx, replacing the Bronx General Post Office on 149th Street. In 1964, the building site (now planned as a Federal Building and post office) was placed at Washington Avenue and Fordham Road, with a final design plan created in 1967. It was to be named after Bronx House of Representatives member Charles A. Buckley, who oversaw the project, following Buckley's death in 1967. The project ultimately fell through due to federal opposition from the administration of President Richard Nixon, in part due to the plan to name the site after Buckley.

=== Redevelopment efforts ===
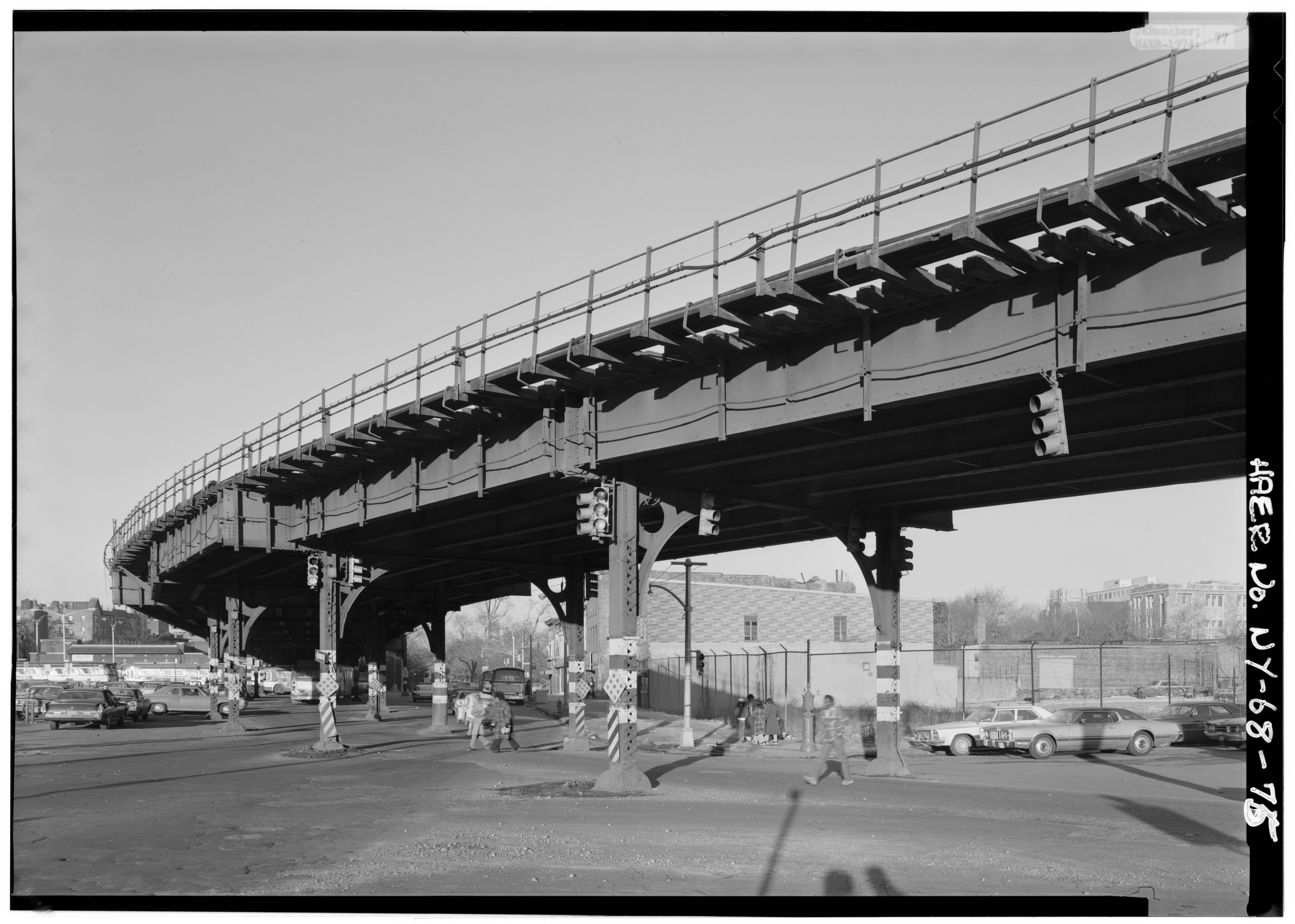
The Third Avenue El through Fordham Plaza in the 1970s

In 1973, the Fordham Road – 190th Street elevated station was closed along with the rest of the Third Avenue El, in part to encourage development in areas such as Fordham Plaza and The Hub. The elevated structure was removed by 1977. Also in 1973, a shopping complex (called Fordham Plaza Development or Fordham Road Plaza Development) was planned for construction on the undeveloped Postal Service site, anchored by the E. J. Korvette department store. The 10-story site would have contained office space for Con Edison and extended south to 188th Street, with 189th Street to be demapped. The project would also include a parking garage, a car dealership, and a scaled-down version of the planned central post office.

The project had been proposed in part to stave off blight and economic downturn in the area due to the 1970s fiscal crisis, which had led city officials to try to prevent Fordham University from relocating out of the borough and into Westchester County, in addition to declare Fordham Road the northern boundary of the South Bronx to reduce the stigma of Fordham being associated with the rundown South Bronx. While construction was planned to be completed by mid-1977, it was delayed by negotiations with the Postal Service (who were asking $8 million for the sale of the site after paying $1.8 million a decade earlier), and ultimately stopped in 1981 when the application for federal funds for the project was frozen.

=== Later redevelopment ===
In 1981, the Sears location on Webster Avenue opened within the former space of the Rogers Department Store branch. In October 1984, a groundbreaking ceremony was held for One Fordham Plaza, the successor to the mall project of the 1970s and the first new office complex in the borough in over 25 years. The Skidmore, Owings & Merrill-designed structure was built on the 5.5-acre (2.2 ha) former Postal Service property that had been a vacant urban-renewal site for over a decade prior; the USPS was paid $1.4 million in 1983 to give up the plot and move to a smaller site one block south on East 188th Street, which is now the Fordham Post Office. The structure was complete by 1985, and it opened in August 1986 at the cost of about $65 million. Upon opening, it was predominantly leased by city and state agencies, while much of the retail space was vacant. The building was over 95 percent occupied by 1991.

Prior to the 1990s, what is now the Fordham Plaza Bus Terminal was a peddler's market, metered parking lot, and bus layover area. In the 1980s, it was proposed to redevelop the site into a bus terminal and public space. Construction began in 1995, paving the plaza with cobblestone and adding the bus shelters and obelisk sculptures. It was officially opened on August 28, 1997.

In 2004, the Sears Building was purchased by the Acadia Realty Trust and P/A Associates. A year later, an expansion project was announced. On March 29, 2007, groundbreaking began on the expansion of the complex, renamed Fordham Place, which would build a new 14-story mixed use structure on two parking lots adjacent to the Sears building. It was the first mixed-use development in the borough since the opening of One Fordham Plaza. The Sears store closed that year due to the project. The new Fordham Place, however, brought several new outlets, including the borough's first Best Buy location, a Walgreens pharmacy, and a new smaller Sears store. The enlarged complex opened in February 2009. As of March 11, 2025, however, all 3 stores have since closed or relocated due to increased crime.

Mayor Michael Bloomberg published the PlaNYC 2030 plan of public initiatives in 2007. Part of that plan included a restructuring of Fordham Plaza's bus terminal and market area, in order to improve lighting and public safety and increase public space. The project received funding from the United States Department of Transportation, including $7.2 million from the TIGER grant program. Construction began in February 2013. Renovations on the Fordham Metro-North station in conjunction with the project began in March 2014. The current bus loop was completed in 2014, and construction started on the second phase of the project on August 27, 2014. The entire plaza opened to the public on January 20, 2016. In 2018, the Bronx Night Market was founded.

== Transportation ==
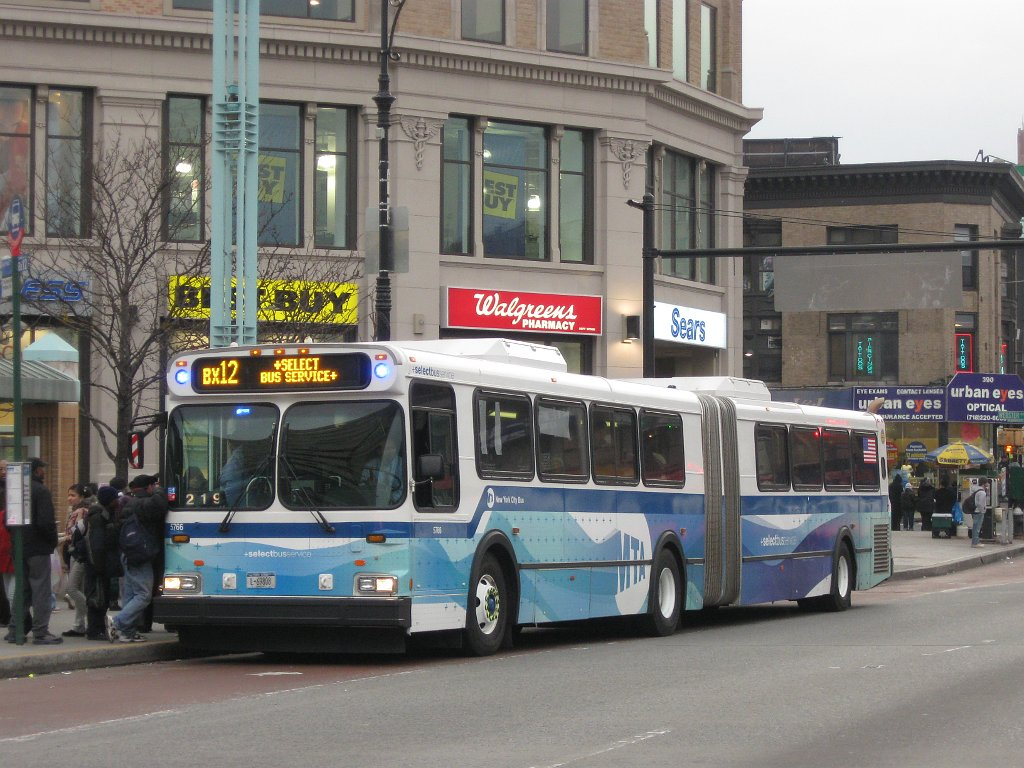
A Bx12 SBS bus stopped at Fordham Plaza near Fordham Place in 2009

Twelve New York City Bus local routes, as well as three from the Bee-Line Bus System of Westchester County, stop at or near the plaza. These include the Bx12 and Bx41 Select Bus Service routes that run along Fordham Road and Webster Avenue respectively. Only two routes (the Bx15 and Bx17) actually stop within the plaza's bus terminal area, and only the Bx15 uses the loop.

The plaza is located directly above the Metro-North's Fordham station, one of the busiest in that system. The main entrance and ticket office is located across Fordham Road, while a secondary entrance (consisting of two stairways to the respective northbound and southbound platforms) is located at the north end of the plaza bus loop.

With the closure of the Third Avenue El in 1973, the closest subway stop to the plaza is the Fordham Road station of the IND Concourse Line six blocks west, along the B and D trains.

== See also ==
- The Hub, Bronx, another major shopping and transportation hub on Third Avenue and 149th Street in the South Bronx.
- Norwood News, local newspaper.
