= Botanical Garden station (Metro-North) =

Metro-North Railroad station in the Bronx, New York

Botanical Garden
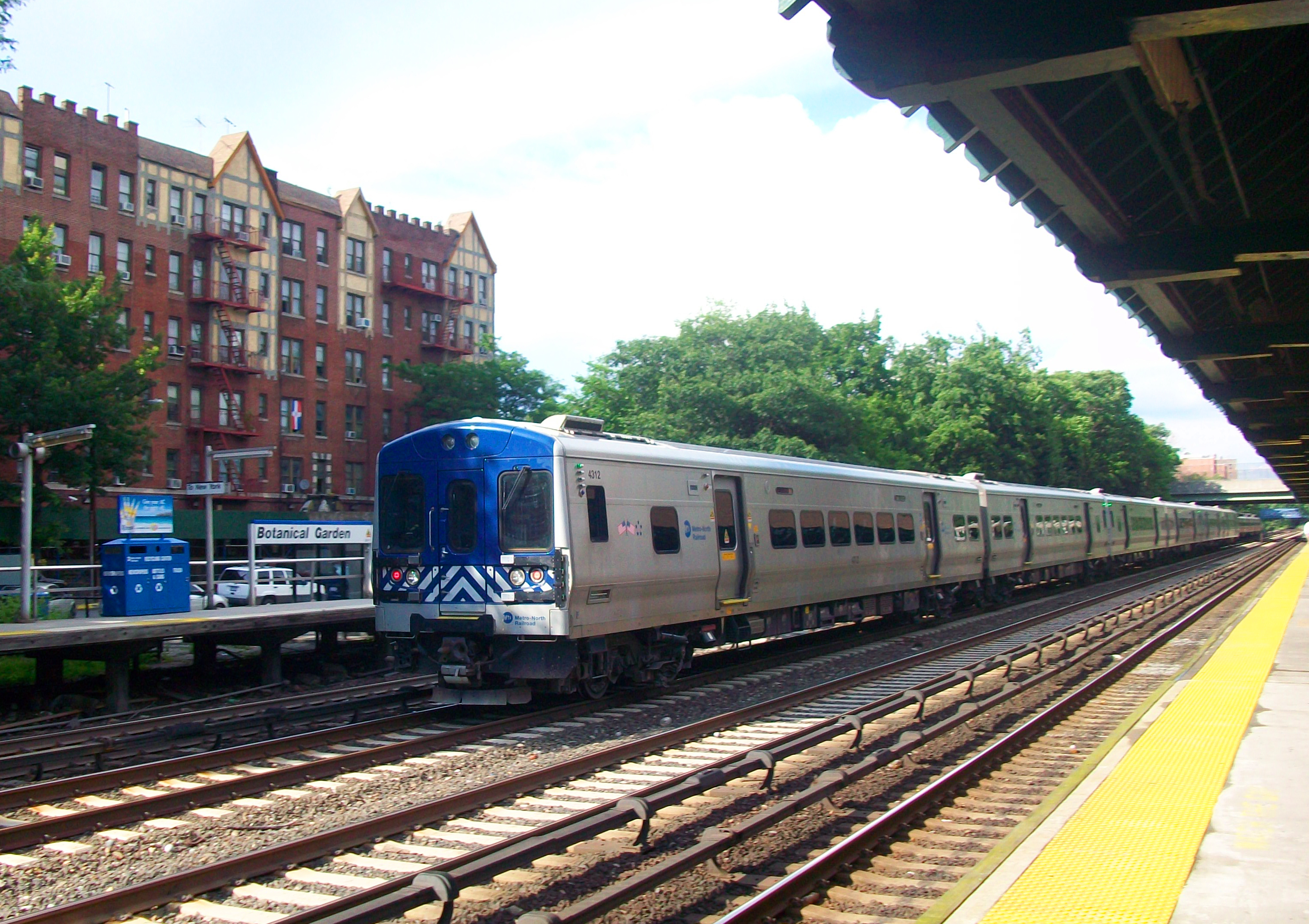
- A southbound Harlem Line train passing through the station

General information
- Location: 2999 Southern Boulevard; Bedford Park, Bronx, New York
- Coordinates: 40.8671°N 73.8819°W
- Owner: Metro-North Railroad
- Line: Harlem Line
- Platforms: 2 side platforms
- Tracks: 4
- Connections: New York City Bus: Bx25, Bx26, Bx41, Bx41 SBS

Construction
- Parking: Yes; Private
- Accessible: yes

Other information
- Fare zone: 2

History
- Opened: 1890s
- Electrified: 700V (DC) third rail

Passengers
- 2018: 793 (Metro-North)
- Rank: 62 of 109

Services
Preceding station	Metro-North Railroad	Following station
Fordham toward Grand Central	Harlem Line	Williams Bridge toward North White Plains
New Haven Line does not stop here

Former services
Preceding station	New York Central Railroad	Following station
Fordham toward New York	Harlem Division	Williams Bridge toward Chatham
Location

Botanical Garden station (also known as Botanical Garden–East 200th Street station) is a commuter rail stop on the Metro-North Railroad's Harlem Line, serving the Bedford Park section of the Bronx, New York City. The station is located just north of the intersection of Southern Boulevard and Bedford Park Boulevard (East 200th Street) adjacent to northern Bronx Park and the New York Botanical Garden. The station has two high-level side platforms, each eight cars long, that serve the outer tracks of the four-track Harlem Line.

== History ==
Prior to the establishment of the Botanical Garden station, its location was the former site of Bedford Park station, a railroad station that connected to a privately owned one-mile spur leading west to the Jerome Park Racetrack, which contained its own station of the same name. The racetrack was closed on October 4, 1894 to make way for the installation of the Jerome Park Reservoir, and the spur was used for construction of the reservoir until 1906.

Like the site for which it was named, Botanical Garden station originates back to the 1890s, although it originally had structures on both sides of the tracks. The structure that serves the gardens itself on the north side of the tracks still exists, while the old station house on the southbound platforms was torn down. Botanical Gardens station was south of a derailment on February 16, 1907 that resulted in 20 deaths and 150 injuries. This was one day after New York Central Railroad electrified the Harlem Line in reaction to being chastised in the press after the Park Avenue Tunnel accident of 1902. Some sources have mistakenly referred to the site of the crash as being at Woodlawn station. From 1920 to 1973, there was also a connection to the 200th Street station along the IRT Third Avenue Line over the intersection of Webster Avenue and Bedford Park Boulevard just southwest of the station.

As with many NYCRR stations in the Bronx, the station became a Penn Central station once the NYC & Pennsylvania Railroads merged in 1968. Penn Central's continuous financial despair throughout the 1970s forced them to turn over their commuter service to the Metropolitan Transportation Authority.On September 10, 1974, the MTA announced that work would start on the construction of high-level platforms at eleven stations in Manhattan and the Bronx including at Botanical Gardens. The entire project cost $2.8 million. The work was expected to be completed in the late summer of 1975. Sometime between 1975 and 1981, MTA demolished the southbound station house and replaced it with aluminum and Plexiglas bus shelters. The station and the railroad were turned over to Conrail in 1976, and eventually became part of the MTA's Metro-North Railroad in 1983. In June 2025, the MTA began replacing the elevators at the Botanical Garden station, as part of a project that also added elevators to the Williams Bridge and Woodlawn stations.
