= Fordham Road =

Street in the Bronx, New York

Coordinates: 40°51′44.13″N 73°53′56.07″W

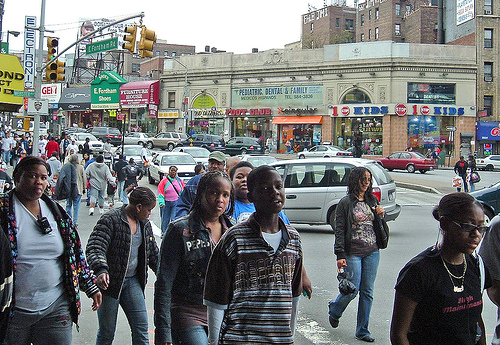
- Fordham Road at Webster Avenue in Belmont
- Maintained by: NYCDOT
- Length: 2.4 mi (3.9 km)
- Component highways: US 1 from Belmont to Bronx Park
- Location: The Bronx
- West end: I-87 / University Heights Bridge in University Heights
- Major junctions: US 1 in Belmont
- East end: US 1 / Bronx River Parkway / Pelham Parkway in Bronx Park

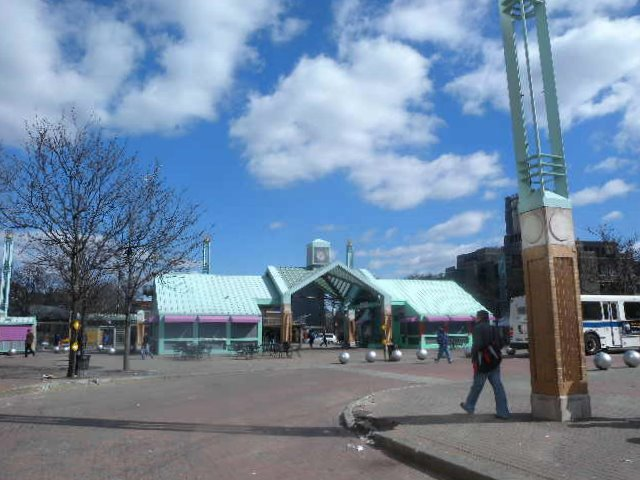
Fordham Plaza bus hub

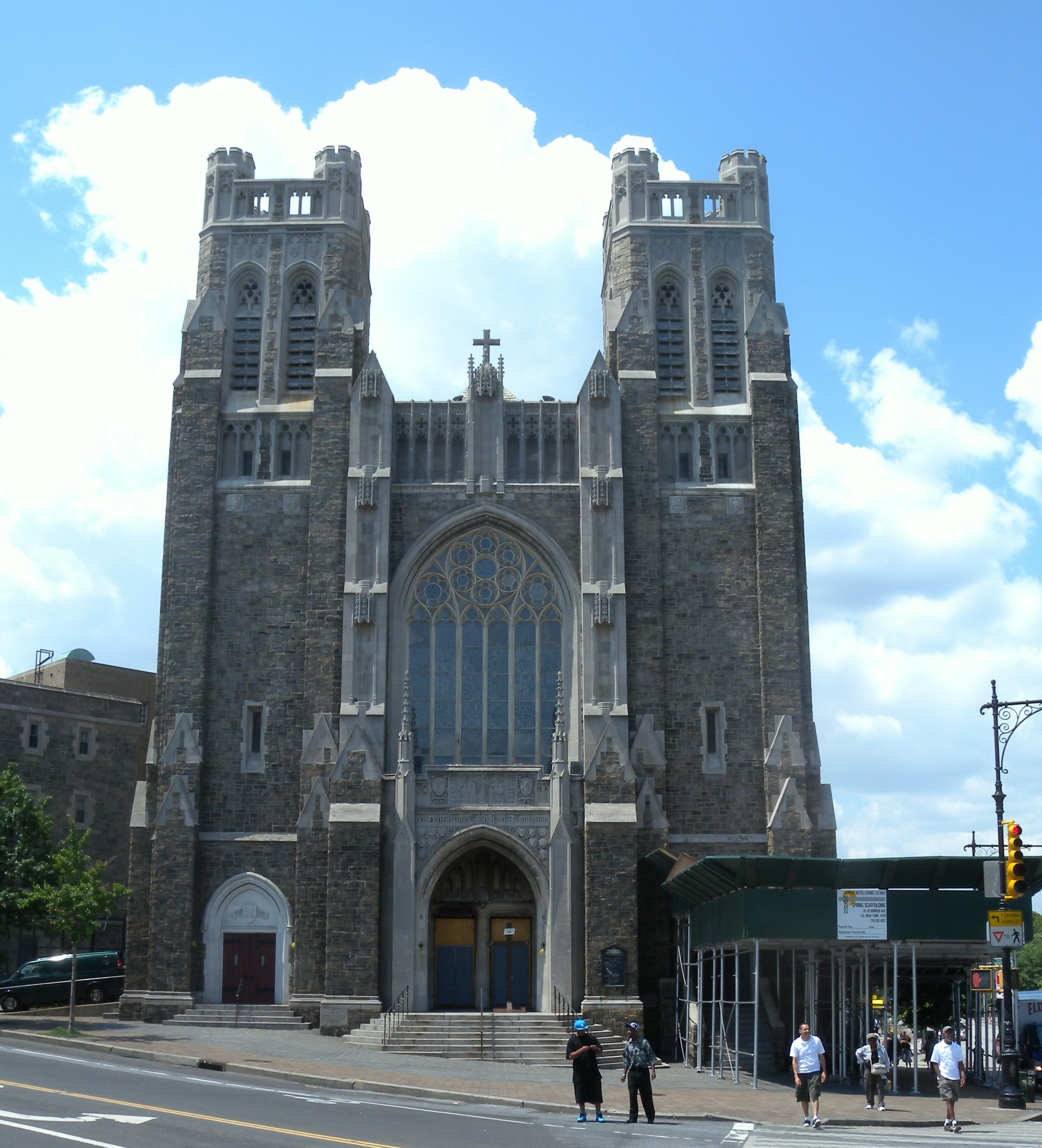
St Nicholas of Tolentine Church

Fordham Road is a major thoroughfare in the Bronx, New York City, that runs west-east from the Harlem River to Bronx Park. Fordham Road houses the borough's largest and most diverse shopping district. It geographically separates the geopolitical North Bronx from the South Bronx.

This street runs through the neighborhood of University Heights, divides Fordham from Fordham-Bedford and finally runs along the northern border of Belmont. It begins to the east as a continuation of Pelham Parkway and continues to the west as the University Heights Bridge into Manhattan. It is a two-way, four-lane road. Fordham Road runs concurrent with U.S. Route 1 from Webster Avenue to the Bronx River Parkway. Fordham Road is divided into East Fordham Road and West Fordham Road by Jerome Avenue following after the Manhattan grid, with address numbers for both the East Fordham Road and West Fordham Road increasing away from Jerome Avenue.

Fordham Road is under the management of the Fordham Road Business Improvement District, a non-profit organization under contract with the City of New York. The BID maintains, develops, and markets the merchants along Fordham Road and hosts many community events throughout the year.

== Transportation ==
East of Webster Avenue and directly across from Fordham University, Fordham Plaza is a major hub for buses and a stop on the Metro-North Railroad's Harlem and New Haven lines. Metro North Railroad's Hudson Line stops at the University Heights station. Fordham Road is served by the New York City Subway at Jerome Avenue (4 train) and Grand Concourse (B and D trains).

The following bus routes serve Fordham Road:

- The Bx12 local & Select Bus Service are the primary routes running along the entire length of Fordham Road.
- The Bx9 runs between East Kingsbridge Road and Southern Boulevard.
- The Bx17 runs between Crotona Avenue and either Washington Avenue (Fordham Plaza) or Third Avenue (Port Morris).
- The Bx22 provides additional service east of Valentine Avenue (Castle Hill) or East Kingsbridge Road (Paul Avenue). Fordham service operates straight to/from Valentine.
- The Bx19 and Bx41 local & Select Bus Service intersect with the road at Southern Boulevard and Webster Avenue, respectively.
- The Bx15 uses Fordham from Third to Washington Avenues and back the other way to change direction from Fordham Plaza to The Hub.
- Additional service is provided by Westchester County’s Bee-Line Bus routes 60 and 61 east of Washington Avenue (Bronx) or Third Avenue (opposite terminals), and route 62 east of Tiebout Avenue.

== Points of interest ==
- Fordham Plaza is a major commercial and transportation hub.
- St. Nicholas of Tolentine's Church is located on West Fordham Road at University Avenue in University Heights.
- Rose Hill Campus of Fordham University is at 441 East Fordham Road.
- Theodore Roosevelt High School is on the other side of Fordham Road from Fordham University.
- The Bronx Zoo and New York Botanical Garden are at the eastern terminus of Fordham Road in Bronx Park.

== Major intersections ==
The entire route is in the New York City borough of the Bronx.

| Location | mi | km | Destinations | Notes |
|---|---|---|---|---|
| University Heights | 0.0 | 0.0 | University Heights Bridge | Continuation west |
| University Heights | 0.1 | 0.16 | I-87 (Major Deegan Expressway) – Albany, RFK Bridge, Queens | Exit 9 on I-87 |
| University Heights | 0.3 | 0.48 | Sedgwick Avenue | |
| Fordham | 0.7 | 1.1 | Jerome Avenue | |
| Fordham | 0.9 | 1.4 | Grand Concourse | Access via service roads; former NY 22; no left turns |
| Belmont | 1.2 | 1.9 | US 1 south (Webster Avenue) | Western end of US 1 concurrency; no westbound left turn |
| Belmont | 1.4 | 2.3 | To US 1 south (Webster Avenue) | Access via Washington Avenue |
| Belmont | 1.7– 2.0 | 2.7– 3.2 | Bronx Zoo, Fordham University, Botanical Garden | Interchange; access via Southern Boulevard |
| Bronx Park | 2.4 | 3.9 | Bronx River Parkway – White Plains, Soundview Park | Cloverleaf interchange; exits 7E-W on Bronx River Parkway |
| Bronx Park | 2.4 | 3.9 | US 1 north (Boston Road) / Pelham Parkway east | Continuation east; eastern end of US 1 concurrency |
1.000 mi = 1.609 km; 1.000 km = 0.621 mi: Incomplete access
