= Bronx Night Market =

Night market in New York

Coordinates: 40°51′39″N 73°53′28″W

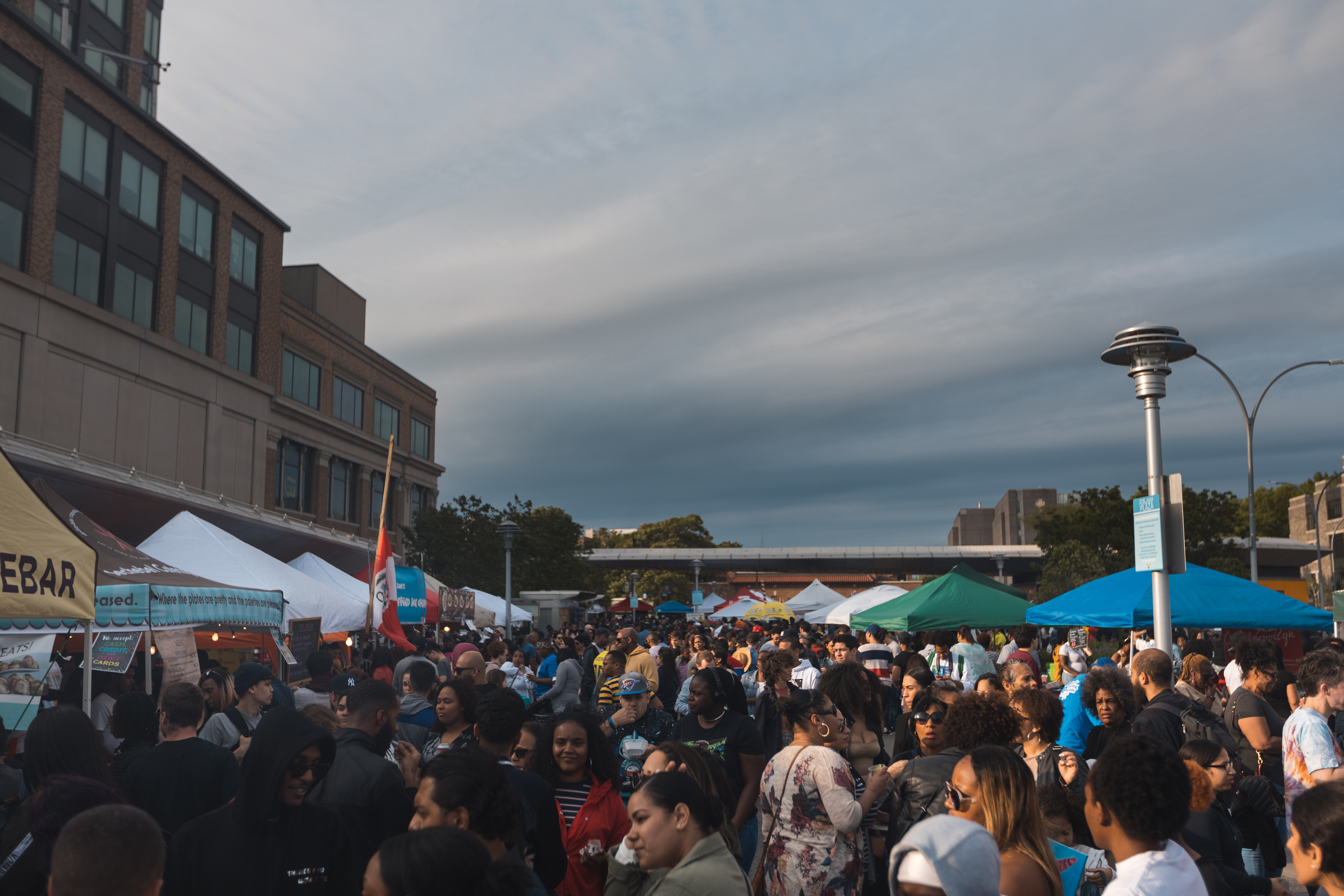
The Bronx Night Market

The Bronx Night Market is an open-air market that originated in Fordham Plaza, Bronx next to Fordham University. It takes place on the last Saturday of the month from April to November from 4 pm to 10 pm. Vendors sell foods from more than 40 countries and a variety of merchandise, with live music.

== History ==
The Bronx Night Market was founded in 2018 by Marco Shalma and it is the first night market and series event in the Bronx. The market grew in popularity quickly in the borough.

The market continued during the COVID-19 pandemic in New York City such as requiring face coverings and contact tracing.
