= Validus Preparatory Academy =

Public school in New York City

Location
- 1595 Bathgate Avenue; Bronx, New York 10457; United States
- 40°50′24″N 73°54′06″W

Information
- Motto: "Strong Mind. Strong Body."
- Established: 2005
- School district: New York City Geographic District # 9
- School number: X263
- Principal: Christopher Hibbert
- Teaching staff: 20.0 (as of 2007–08)
- Grades: 9–12
- Enrollment: 336 (as of 2007–08)
- Student to teacher ratio: 16.8 (as of 2007–08)
- Colors: Black, Purple, Gray
- Athletics: Baseball, JV Baseball, Softball, Cross Country, Wrestling
- Mascot: Bathgate Bulldogs
- Nickname: VPA
- Team name: Bathgate Bulldogs
- Website: http://www.validusprep.org/

Validus Preparatory Academy is a small public high school in the south Bronx, New York. Founded in 2005, Validus currently enrolls 432 students in grades 9–12.

== History ==
Validus Prep was initially supported through a Gates Foundation grant to partner with New York City Outward Bound to create small learning communities in New York City.

== Campus ==
The campus houses its own municipal purpose center, library and all classes are centered around a glass atrium in the main hall.

== Curriculum ==
The school follows the state curriculum, incorporating curriculum from Expeditionary learning schools Expeditionary Learning Schools Outward Bound. The curriculum is very challenging and contains leadership classes to enhance students leadership potential. Validus students were featured in an MSNBC video speaking about the challenges of a presidential election.

== Extracurricular activities ==
All ninth graders attend a week-long Outward Bound experience in the fall at Sharpe Reservation at Harriman State Park to build character, teamwork and leadership skills. All Students in Validus are put in groups of 10-15 student groups called crews; Crews are headed by Validus teachers who act as personal guidance counselors. All Crews are involved in a crew challenge called crew Olympics where they compete against one another to become Crew Champions.
