= Muni Meter =

Parking meter system in New York City

Muni Meter is the name used by the New York City Department of Transportation (NYCDOT) for its pay and display centralized parking meter system. The Muni Meter system was introduced broadly in 2009, following a period of experimentation that began in 1999. Muni Meters are located on streets adjacent to a group of parking spots, with no designated striping that separates spots. A driver parks their car, pays at the Muni Meter (using coins, credit cards, or prepaid parking cards), and takes a receipt provided by the Meter. They then display that receipt on their vehicle's dashboard. The system reduces the number of individual meter devices required, increases the number of parking spots available (by allowing as many cars to park as can fit) and, some argue, reduces losses due to unused time left on meters (which may then be reused by subsequent parkers).
