= Bx15 and M125 buses =

Bus routes in Manhattan and the Bronx, New York

bx15, m125 bx15
- Third Avenue/125th Street Line
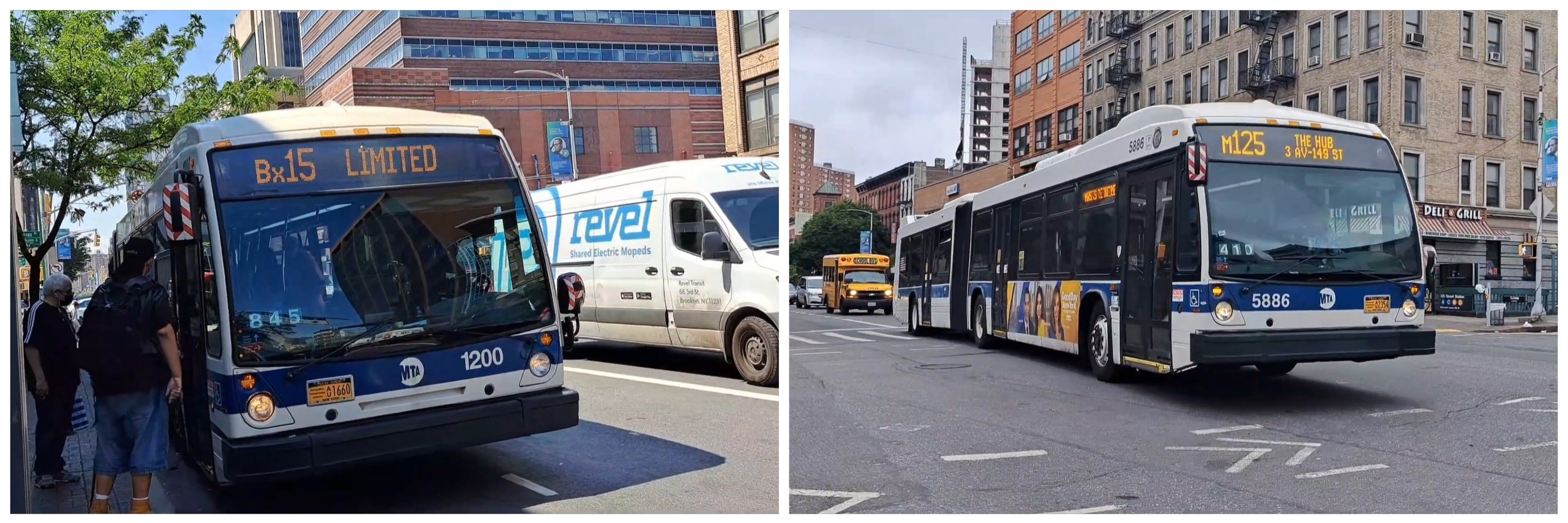
- 2009 Nova LFSA #1200 on the BX15 (Pre-Redesign 2022) and 2013 Nova LFSA #5886 on the M125 (Post-Redesign 2022)

Overview
- System: MTA Regional Bus Operations
- Operator: Manhattan and Bronx Surface Transit Operating Authority
- Garage: Kingsbridge Depot (Bx15); Mother Clara Hale Depot (M125)
- Vehicle: Nova Bus LFS articulated; New Flyer Xcelsior XD60; Nova Bus LFS Nova Bus LFS HEV Nova Bus LFSe+ (Bx15 supplemental service); New Flyer Xcelsior XDE40 (M125 supplemental service)
- Began service: 1864 (streetcar line); April 1, 1916 (Bronx-Harlem streetcar); August 5, 1941 (Previously Bx29, and present Bx15 bus service); June 26, 2022 (M125 bus service)

Route
- Locale: The Bronx and Manhattan, New York, U.S.
- Communities served: Fordham, Belmont, Tremont, Morrisania, Melrose, Mott Haven (Bx15); Mott Haven, East Harlem, Harlem, Manhattanville (M125)
- Start: Fordham Plaza, Bronx – Fordham Road (Bx15); The Hub, Bronx – 149th Street (M125)
- Via: Third Avenue (Bx15), 125th Street (M125)
- End: The Hub, Bronx – 149th Street (Bx15); Manhattanville, Manhattan – 12th Avenue (M125)
- Length: 3.5 miles (5.6 km) (Bx15); 3.2 miles (5.1 km) (M125)
- Other routes: Bx41 Webster Av; M60 SBS 125th St/Astoria Bl/LaGuardia Airport; M100 B'way/Amsterdam Av; M101 3rd/Lexington Avs/125th St/Amsterdam Av

Service
- Operates: 24 hours
- Annual patronage: 1,467,468 (Bx15, 2025); 1,595,377 (M125, 2025)
- Timetable: Bx15 M125

The Bx15 and M125 bus routes constitute the Third Avenue/125th Street Line, a public transit line in New York City. The Bx15 runs between Fordham Plaza and the Hub in the Bronx, running primarily along Third Avenue. The M125 runs between the Hub in the Bronx and Manhattanville in Manhattan, running along Willis Avenue in the South Bronx and along 125th Street in Harlem, Manhattan.

Prior to 2022, the corridor was a single bus route, the Bx15. The route is the successor to a streetcar line of the Union Railway Company and later the Third Avenue Railway known as the Willis Avenue Line or Willis Avenue−125th Street Line. The streetcar line, the first street railway in the Bronx, was known as the Harlem Bridge, Morrisania, and Fordham Railroad. The route began operation on Third Avenue in the Bronx in 1864, and the company was incorporated as the Union Railway Company in 1892. The Union Railroad applied in 1904 for extensions of several streetcar lines into Manhattan, including an extension of the Willis Avenue Line across 125th Street. The Willis Avenue Line was ultimately extended in 1916 across the 125th Street Crosstown Line.

The streetcar line was replaced by bus service in 1941; the route was known as the Bx29 prior to 1984. From 1973 to 2013 the Bx15 shared Third Avenue with the Bx55, a limited-stop service which replaced rapid transit service on the Third Avenue Elevated line between the Hub and Williamsbridge. In 2013, the Bx55 was converted into the Bx15 Limited, extending the route south to Manhattan, but eliminating service north of Fordham Plaza. The Bx15 south of the Hub was expected to be split into a new M125 bus route in 2020, but was delayed due to the COVID-19 pandemic in New York City; the split took place on June 26, 2022.

== Route description and service ==
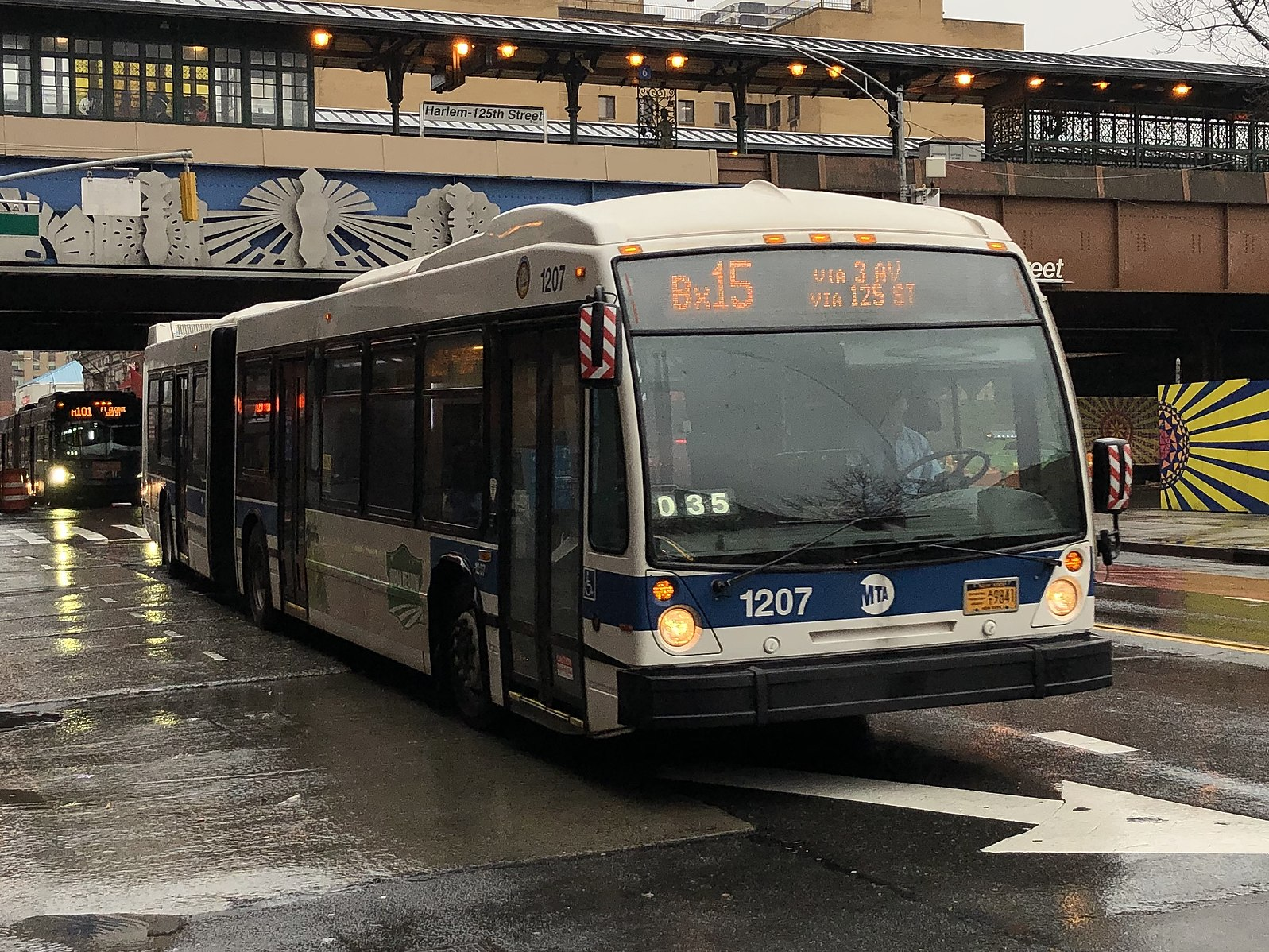
A 2010 Nova Bus LFS articulated (1207) on the West Harlem-bound Bx15 at 125th Street/Park Avenue in 2020

The current Bx15 bus route begins at Fordham Road and Third Avenue in today's Fordham Plaza. It runs south down Third Avenue to Third Avenue–149th Street station in the Hub, where it terminates. The Bx15 connects the two largest shopping districts in the Bronx: Fordham Road and the Hub.

The M125 bus route begins at the Hub, traveling south on Willis Avenue. At 138th Street, southbound buses turn west and travel on the Third Avenue Bridge into Manhattan, while northbound buses use the Willis Avenue Bridge from Manhattan. After crossing the bridge into Harlem, the M125 turns west along 125th Street, sharing the 125th Street Crosstown Line with several other bus routes. It terminates at the west shore of Manhattan, on 12th Avenue. In Manhattan, the M125 shares the 125th Street Crosstown corridor with two other bus routes: the M101 local bus and the M60 Select Bus Service route to LaGuardia Airport.

On weekdays except early mornings and nights, the Bx15 Limited operates the entire route between 149th Street and Fordham Plaza, making limited stops. The Bx15 local runs between 149th Street and Fordham Plaza at all times. Local and limited buses typically run every 8 to 12 minutes all day, except during late nights, when local buses run every hour and limited service does not run. Select southbound buses terminate at Claremont Parkway. The M125 also runs every 8 to 12 minutes all day, except during late nights when buses run every hour. The M125 makes all local stops.

The Bx15 fleet is maintained at the Kingsbridge Depot and mainly uses articulated buses (mostly Nova Bus LFS articulated). The M125 fleet is from Mother Clara Hale Depot and uses Nova articulates and New Flyer XD60s. During BX15’s weekday peak hours and both routes’ supplemental needs, Nova Bus LFS 40 foot (12 m) long buses run on the routes to fill in for articulates.

=== Ridership ===
In 2018, the latest year for which passenger numbers are available, the Bx15 and Bx15 Limited had a combined 7,004,278 passengers, or an average of 21,777 per weekday.

== History ==
=== As a streetcar line ===
In 1863, the first street railway was constructed in the Bronx, known as the Harlem Bridge, Morrisania, and Fordham Railroad. The route ran from the Harlem Bridge (now Third Avenue Bridge) to Fordham via Third Avenue, and began operation in 1864. It was informally called the "Huckleberry Road". In 1892, the company was incorporated as the Union Railway Company. On August 23 of that year, it was granted several streetcar franchises in the Bronx by the Board of Aldermen, as part of an expanded "Huckleberry System". This included a line from the Harlem River to the Westchester County border via Willis Avenue, Melrose Avenue, Webster Avenue, and Bronx River Road. The line was completed by fall 1895. The company would become a subsidiary of the Third Avenue Railway in 1898.

In February 1904, the Union Railroad would apply for extensions of several streetcar lines into Manhattan. This included an extension of the Willis Avenue Line from 134th Street in Mott Haven over the recently constructed Willis Avenue Bridge (opened in 1901) into East Harlem at 125th Street, connecting with lines of the Third Avenue Railway. Ten years later on July 2, 1914, the company received a permit to extend Willis Avenue service across the bridge, then west along 125th Street to Fort Lee Ferry, which connected Manhattan with Fort Lee, New Jersey. The service was requested to eliminate the required transfer to other streetcar lines. The new service was inaugurated on April 1, 1916, providing a link between the Bronx and New Jersey. The occasion was celebrated with a 7-day carnival in Harlem. Thereafter, the line became alternately known as the Willis Avenue−125th Street Line.

In its final iteration, the line traveled between Fordham and western Harlem using Third Avenue, the Willis Avenue Bridge, and 125th Street. The line terminated at a loop at 12th Avenue (Riverside Drive) between 125th Street and Saint Clair Place (geographically 129th Street). At 12th Avenue there was a connection to the Fort Lee Ferry. The line formerly proceeded further north along Webster Avenue to McClean Avenue, at the border with the city of Yonkers in Westchester County. This portion of the line was discontinued on August 18, 1935. Between 149th Street and Gun Hill Road, the line ran directly underneath the Third Avenue Elevated line, a rapid transit line which formerly ran to Lower Manhattan. The route between Fordham Plaza and the city line along Webster Avenue was also shared with the Webster and White Plains Avenues Line streetcars.

=== As a bus line ===
==== 20th century ====
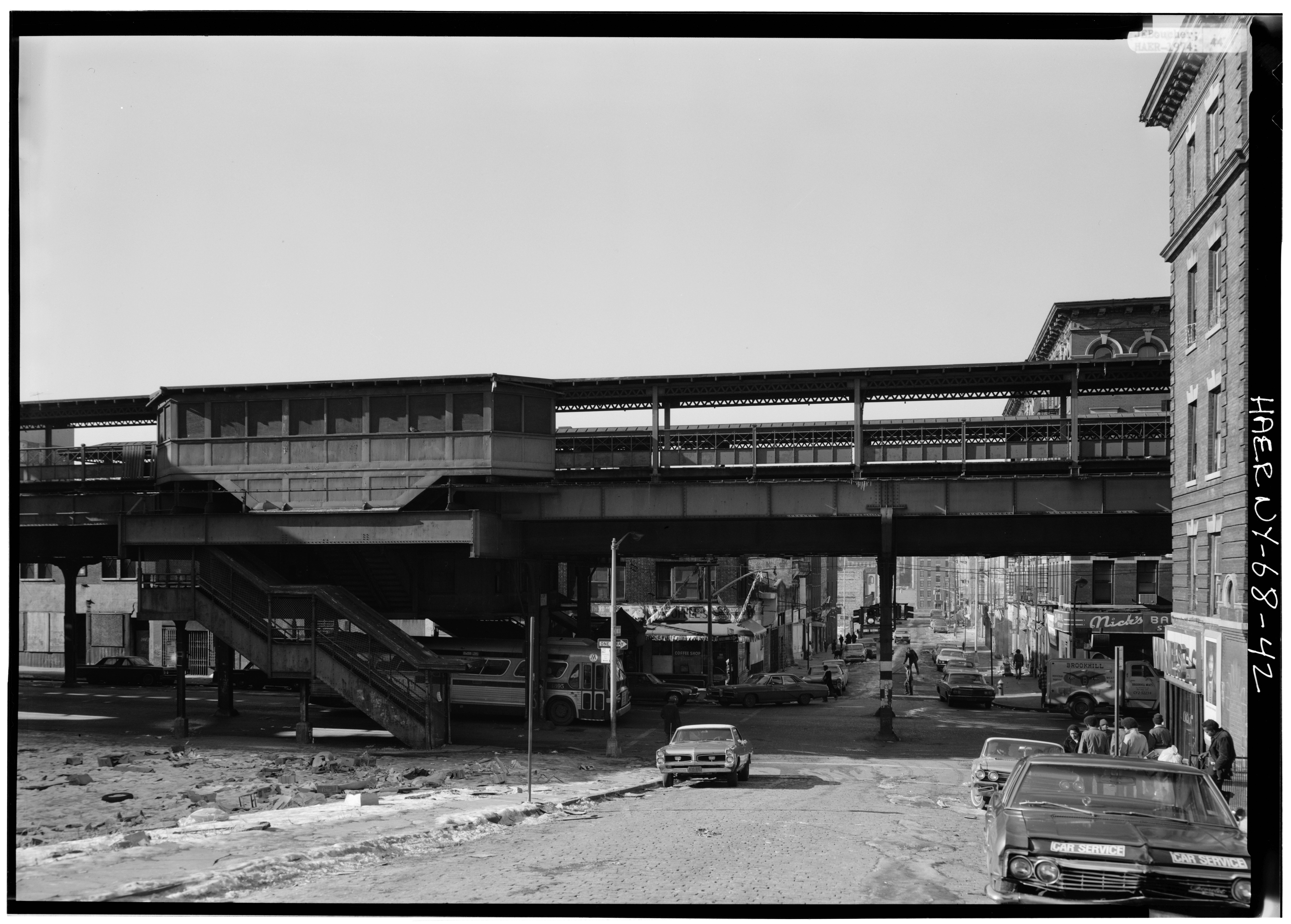
A Bx55 bus running underneath the former 174th Street El station in 1974. This route was discontinued in 2013.

Beginning in the 1920s, many streetcar lines in the Bronx, Manhattan and the rest of the city began to be replaced by buses, particularly after the unification of the city's three primary transit companies in June 1940. The conversion of the Willis Avenue Line occurred in 1941, as part of the conversion of the Third Avenue Bridge and Willis Avenue Bridge into one-way spans between the Bronx and Manhattan. The new traffic pattern was instituted on the morning of August 5, 1941, and bus service along the former streetcar route began that afternoon. The bus route would be numbered 29, later the "Bx29". The bus route was operated by the Third Avenue Railway company until 1956, and by the New York City Omnibus Corporation (later under the brand Fifth Avenue Coach Lines) until 1962. That year, the New York City Transit Authority began operating the line under the subsidiary Manhattan and Bronx Surface Transit Operating Authority (MaBSTOA), which continues to operate the route under the Metropolitan Transportation Authority (MTA).

On April 29, 1973, service on the IRT Third Avenue Line (by that time truncated to the Bronx) was eliminated and replaced by the Bx55 limited bus service, which provided free transfers to the subway at Third Avenue–149th Street and 161st Street–Yankee Stadium. On February 19, 1984, the Bronx bus system was redesigned, and southbound Bx55 service was rerouted off of Washington Avenue between 189th Street and 163rd Street and onto Third Avenue. In addition, several bus routes were redesigned, with higher-priority routes given lower numbers. As part of the 1984 changes, the Bx29 was renumbered to the Bx15. Since the Bx55 already offered free transfers to the subway, it was one of the few routes in the city to allow free transfers to the subway prior to the introduction of the MetroCard in 1993, and one of the first routes to use the MetroCard. Paper tickets were used prior to the use of MetroCard for free transfers at Third Avenue–149th Street and 161st Street—Yankee Stadium.

In June 1995, service along the Bx55 branch to Yankee Stadium via East 161st Street, stopping only at Washington Avenue and River Avenue, was discontinued to improve service for riders and reliability. While only 5% of riders used this branch, it received 21% of service on weekdays and 25% of service on weekends. Bx6 service was increased to mitigate the need to transfer to get to Yankee Stadium. In addition, free transfers were allowed between the Bx55 and intersecting bus routes, changing the route from a rapid transit replacement to a limited-stop branch of the Bx15. In 1995, New York City Transit was in the process of building a weather-protected intermodal terminal at Third Avenue–149th Street. On September 10, 1995, as part of systemwide cuts in bus and subway service to reduce the MTA's budget deficit, late night Bx55 service north of Fordham Plaza was discontinued.

On September 8, 1996, late night Bx55 service, between 1 a.m. and 4:30 a.m., was eliminated and merged with the Bx15. The frequency of Bx15 service along the entire route was reduced from running every 50 minutes to running every 60 minutes. Supplemental Bx15 service was provided between Fordham Road and 149th Street to maintain the Bx55's frequency. To maintain the transfer to the subway, bus-subway transfers were accepted on the Bx15 overnight. The change was made to eliminate duplicative service, which was lightly patronized. In addition, an unnecessary turn at 147th Street was eliminated; it had existed because a support pillar of the Third AvenueI Elevated, which had been demolished for some time, had prevented northbound buses from turning directly from Willis Avenue to Third Avenue.

In December 1999, the MTA announced a plan to make a slight route change in southbound Bx15 service between East 138th Street and the Third Avenue Bridge. At the time, buses ran west on East 138th Street, south on Third Avenue, and south across the Third Avenue Branch. Buses had to cross multiple lanes of moving traffic to get into the leftmost lane so they could exit at East 128th Street in Manhattan. The change would have buses continue to turn left onto Third Avenue, but would reroute buses to turn left at a traffic island, south on Lincoln Avenue, west on East 133rd Street, and south directly onto the leftmost lane of the Third Avenue Bridge, eliminating a weaving maneuver. Two bus stops were added along Lincoln Avenue at East 136th Street and East 133rd Street to provide improved service in the area. The change was planned to take effect in January 2000.

==== 21st century ====
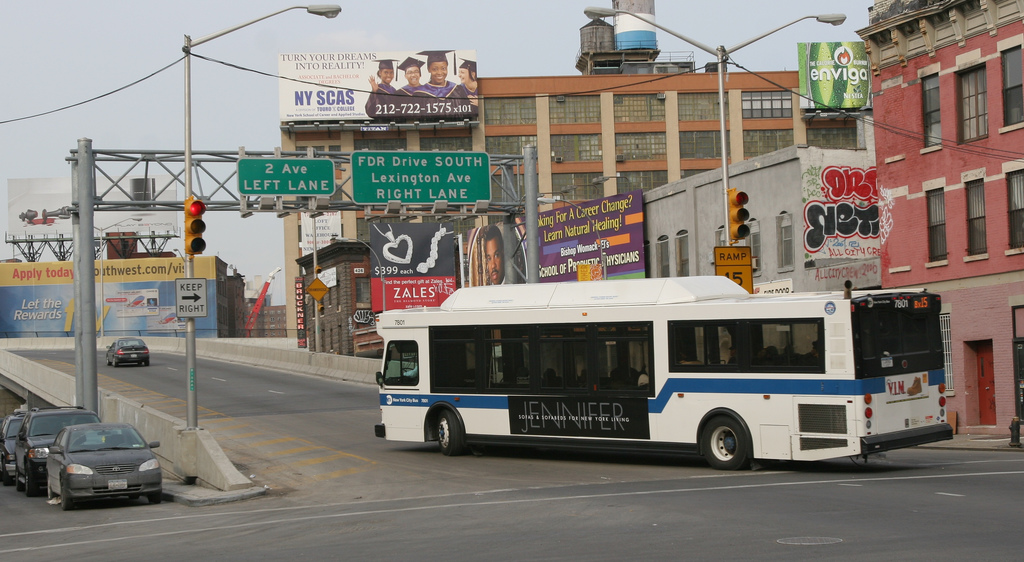
A 2004 Orion VII OG CNG (7801) on the Bx15 entering the Third Avenue Bridge towards upper Manhattan in 2007, before the Bx15's transfer from West Farms Depot to Kingsbridge Depot.

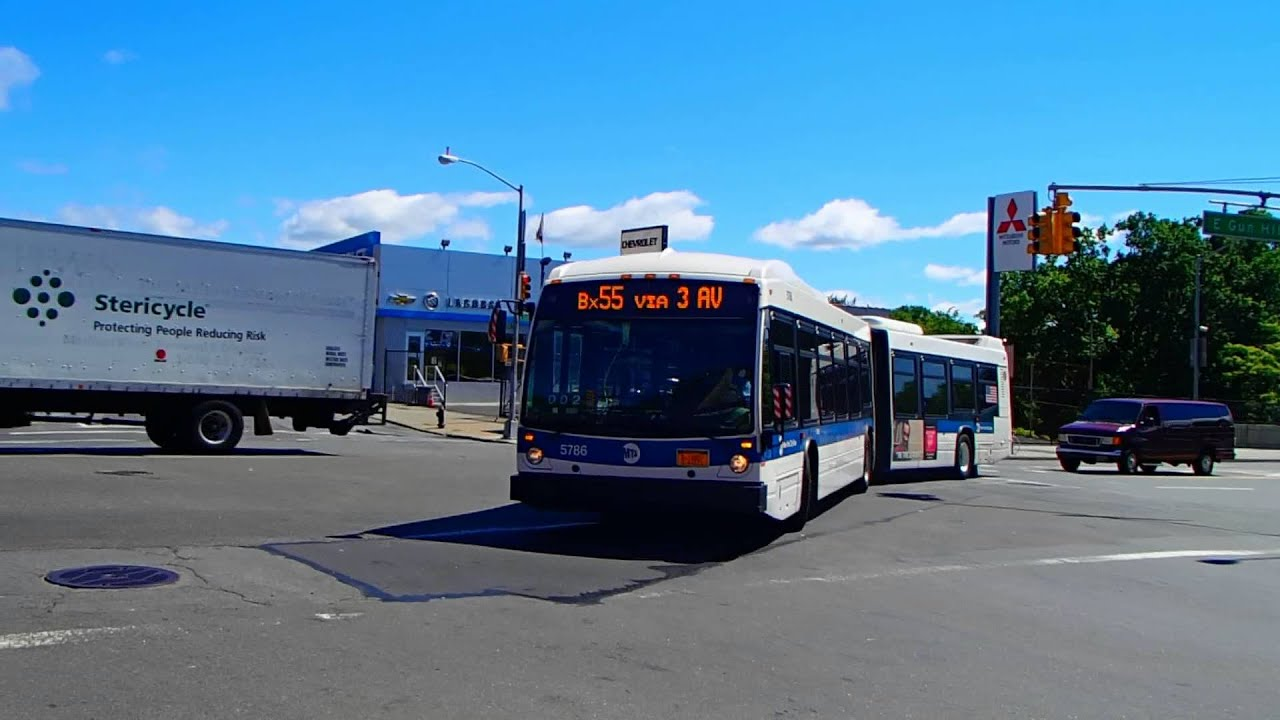
A 2012 Nova Bus LFS Articulated (5786) on the Bx55, before the route was discontinued

In June 2002, as part of an outside study, the Third Avenue corridor was identified for the implementation of bus rapid transit service, due to heavy ridership and slow travel speeds on the corridor. In February 2004, selected weekday and all weekend Bx55 trips terminated at Fordham Plaza. On June 27, 2010, evening and weekend Bx55 service was eliminated due to a budget crisis. As a result, the Bx15 became an articulated bus route in order to hold passengers dispatched from the Bx55.

In 2009, as part of Phase II of the MTA and New York City Department of Transportation (DOT)'s Select Bus Service (SBS), both the Third Avenue and Webster Avenue bus corridors were studied for the implementation of a north-to-south bus rapid transit service through the South Bronx. The Bx41 Limited along Webster Avenue was selected for conversion to SBS since that corridor was wider, and became the Bx41 SBS on June 30, 2013. On the same day, the Bx55 was discontinued and, on July 1, it was replaced by new Bx15 limited-stop service, which operated at all times except late nights and weekends. Service along 125th Street was replaced by Bx15 limited service, and by Bx15 local service when limited service did not run. Service north of Fordham Plaza along Webster Avenue was replaced by the Bx41 SBS. The service changes coincided with the reconstruction of Fordham Plaza's terminal area beginning in 2013, closing Third Avenue to all non-bus through traffic and constructing a bus loop to "turn" terminating Bx15 buses. The bus loop was completed in 2014.

As part of the MTA's 2017 Fast Forward Plan to speed up mass transit service, a draft plan for a reorganization of Bronx bus routes was proposed in draft format in June 2019, with a final version published in October 2019. The plan included splitting the section of the Bx15 south of the Hub into a new bus route labeled the M125, which was proposed to be implemented by mid-2020. Due to the COVID-19 pandemic in New York City, the changes were halted for over a year. A final implementation date was announced in February 2022, and the redesign took effect on June 26, 2022. With the change, an additional free transfer was provided to allow Bx15 riders to continue to transfer to the subway for free along 125th Street, though now with a middle leg on the M125.

== See also ==
- List of streetcar lines in the Bronx
- List of bus routes in the Bronx
