= Gun Hill Road (road) =

Street in the Bronx, New York

Coordinates: 40°52′57.4″N 73°52′51.8″W

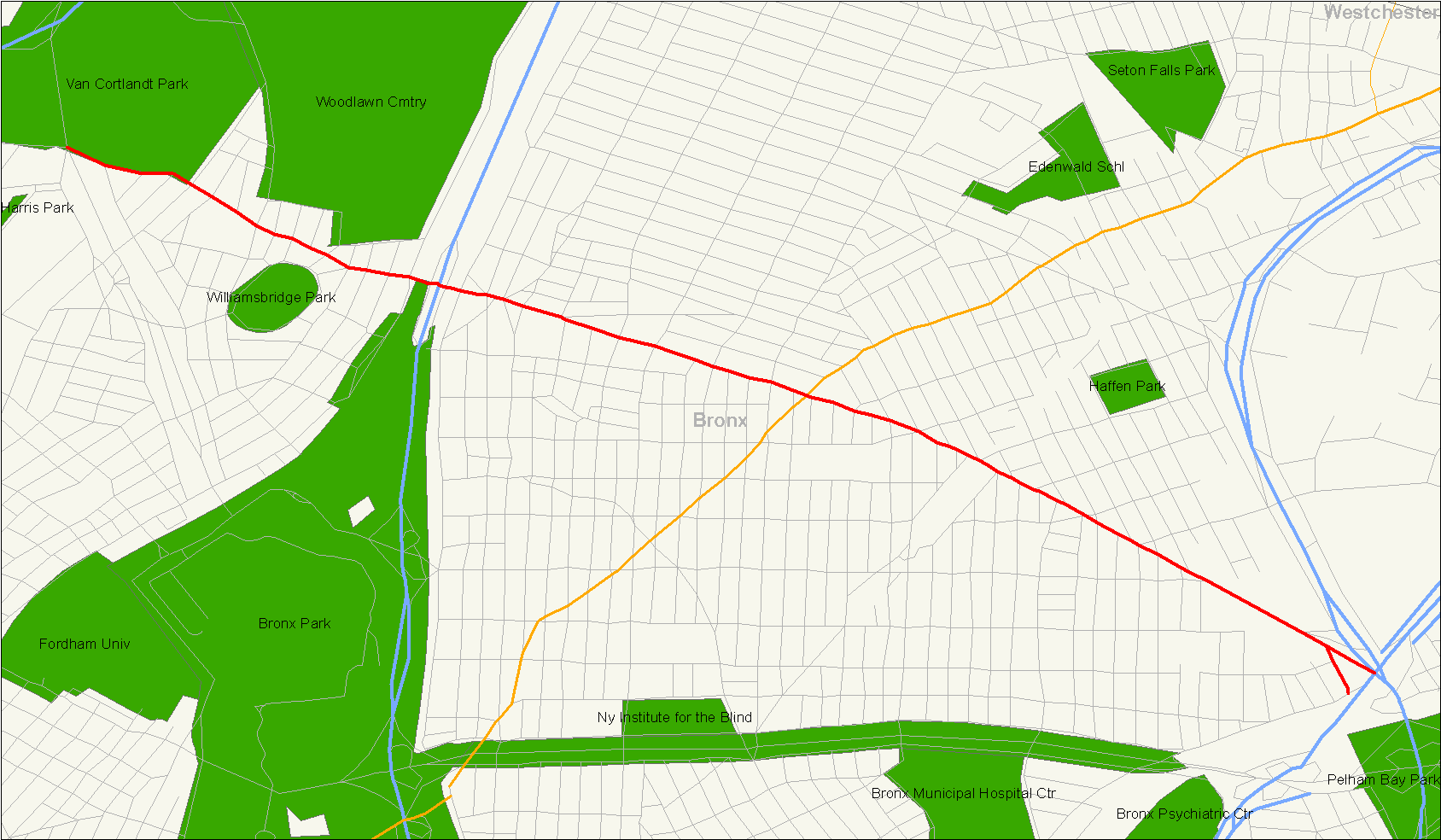
- Map of the East Bronx with Gun Hill Road in red
- Namesake: Gun Hill in Woodlawn Cemetery
- Owner: City of New York
- Maintained by: NYCDOT
- Length: 3.5 mi (5.6 km)
- Location: The Bronx, New York City, US
- West end: Mosholu Parkway in Norwood
- Major junctions: Bronx River Parkway in Bronx Park; US 1 in Williamsbridge
- East end: I-95 / Hutchinson River Parkway in Baychester

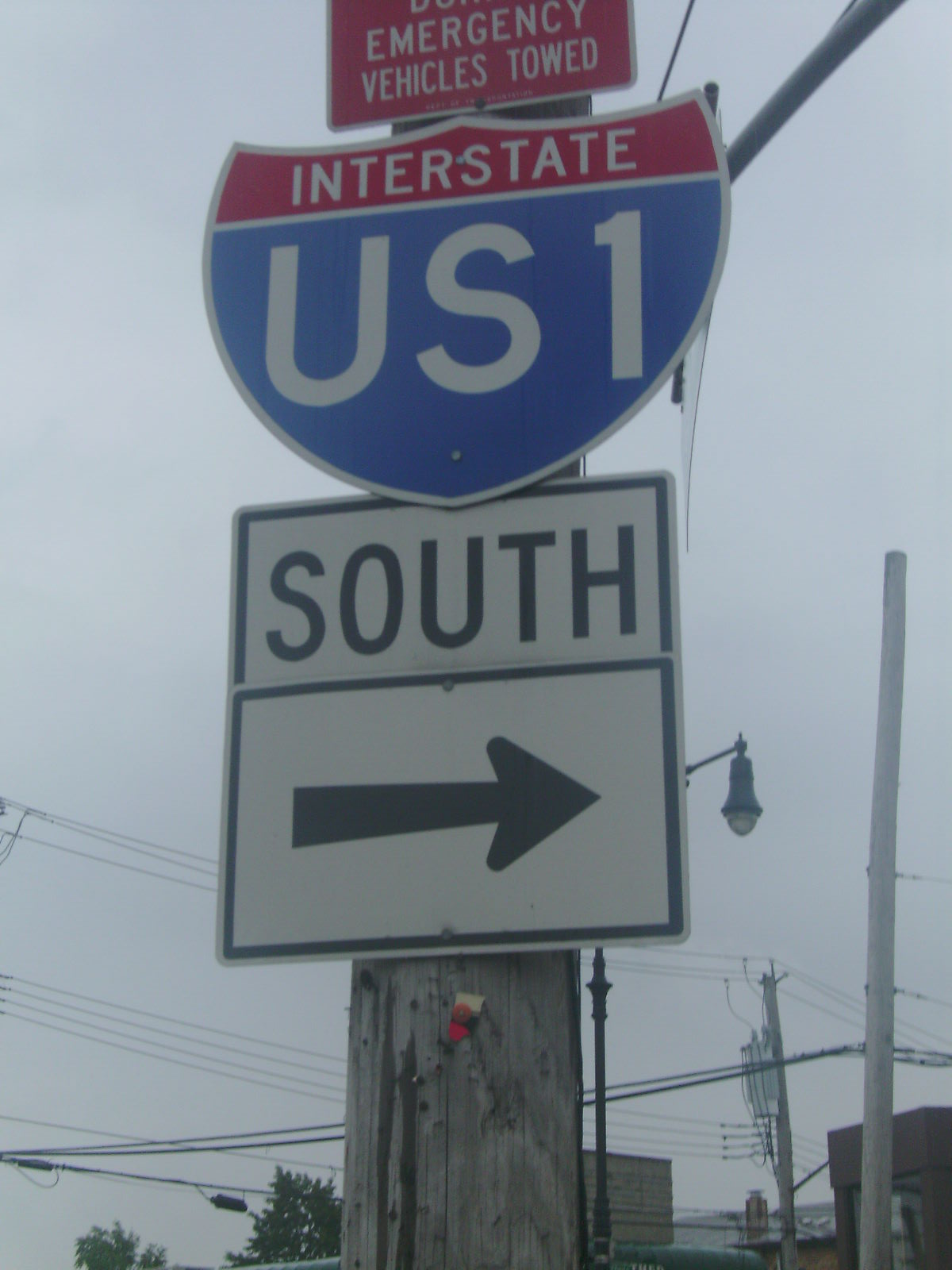
An erroneous I-US1 shield at Gun Hill Road's intersection with U.S. Route 1

Gun Hill Road is a major thoroughfare in the Bronx in New York City, United States. The road stretches for 3.5 miles (5.6 km) from Mosholu Parkway in Norwood to the Hutchinson River Parkway in Baychester. Van Cortlandt Park and the Mosholu Golf Course are both located at the western terminus of Gun Hill Road.

== History ==
During the American Revolution, the road was an important artery over which the British and the Patriot colonists fought. In January 1777, the Continental Army brought a cannon to the top of a hill and fired at the British. The hill, now inside Woodlawn Cemetery, was locally called Gun Hill afterwards. The road was known as Kingsbridge Road (part of the original Boston Post Road) until 1875, when it was renamed Gun Hill Road. It did not originally extend east of White Plains Road but was extended by segments to the Hutchinson River, by 1938.

In 1941, the New York City Planning Department proposed the Gun Hill Crosstown Highway as an upgrade, but nothing happened with this plan. In the mid-1960s, the Tri-State Transportation Commission proposed a new route just a mile north of Gun Hill Road called the City Line Expressway; this plan also did not advance.

== Street description from west to east ==
Gun Hill Road begins at Mosholu Parkway. After an intersection with Jerome Avenue, Gun Hill Road passes to the south of the Mosholu Golf Course. The road name also officially changed from West Gun Hill Road to East Gun Hill Road. At an intersection with DeKalb Avenue in Norwood, the road passes by North Central Bronx Hospital and Montefiore Medical Center. Northwest of there, the road acts as the southern border of Woodlawn Cemetery. At Webster Avenue, Gun Hill Road passes the Williams Bridge station of the Metro-North Railroad. Soon afterward, the road crosses over the Bronx River Parkway, at exit 9. The next major intersection is White Plains Road, which Gun Hill Road intersects within Williamsbridge Square. At this intersection, the road also meets the subway station, which serves the 2 and 5 trains.

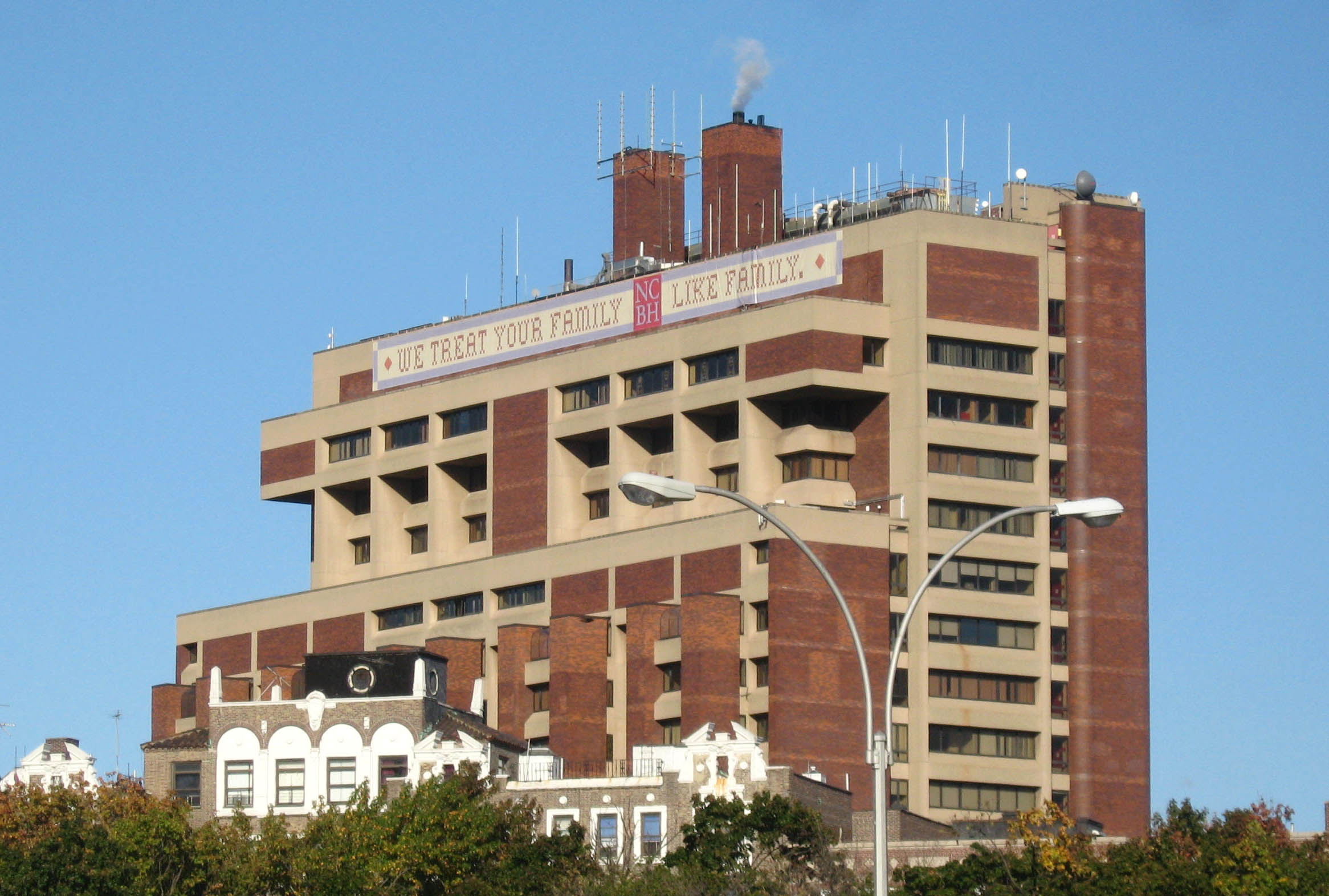
North Central Bronx Hospital

As the road and enters Williamsbridge, there is an intersection with US 1 (Boston Road). Between the DeWitt Place and Sexton Place intersections, the road passes the second subway station for Gun Hill Road, which serves the 5 train. Entering the neighborhood of Baychester, the road intersects with Edson and Ely avenues, in which the former acts as the southbound service road for the New England Thruway. Directly afterward, the road intersects with Interstate 95 (I-95). The road becomes one-way for 0.2 miles (0.3 kilometers) and intersects with Waring Avenue. The road terminates at an intersection with Stillwell Avenue and the Hutchinson River Parkway.

== Transportation ==
=== Commuter rail ===
The Williams Bridge station, serving Metro-North Railroad's Harlem Line, is located next to the intersection with the Bronx River Parkway.

=== Subway ===
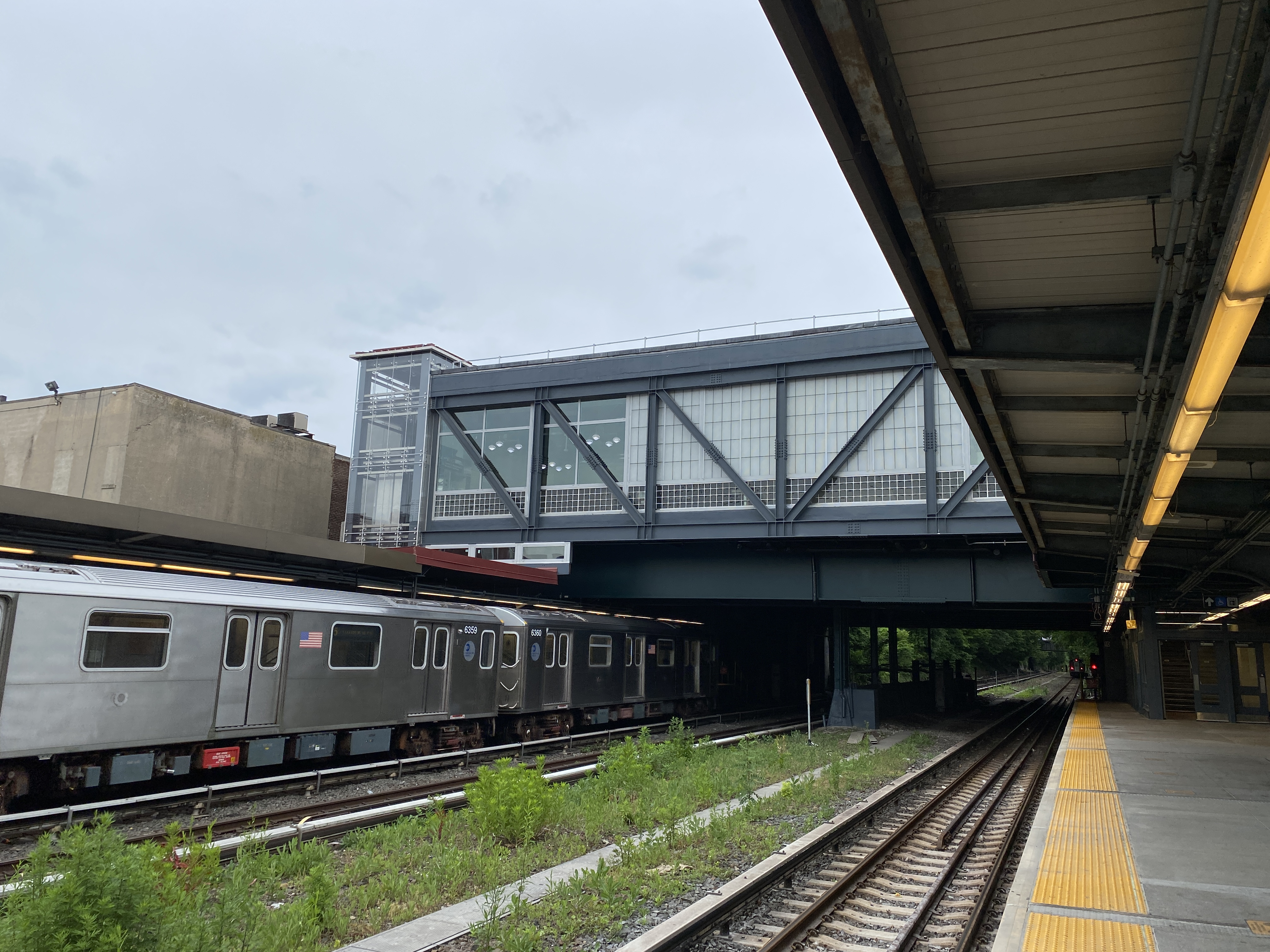
The subway station on the IRT Dyre Avenue Line

There are two New York City Subway stations on Gun Hill Road:

- Gun Hill Road on the IRT White Plains Road Line at White Plains Road, serving the 2 and 5 trains. The Third Avenue EL train (8) served the now abandoned lower level of this station.
- Gun Hill Road on the IRT Dyre Avenue Line at Seymour Avenue, serving the 5 train

=== Bus ===
Several buses travel on Gun Hill Road:

- The primary routes that traverse the corridor are the Bx28 and Bx38, between Bartow and Bainbridge Avenues.
- From there, the Pelham-bound Bx16 and Woodlawn-bound Bx34 and BxM4 run to Jerome Avenue, along with the Bx10 in both directions, the only route to head south on Jerome.
- The Bx41 local & Select Bus Service run between Webster Avenue and White Plains Road, where they both terminate.

== Major intersections ==
The entire route is in the New York City borough of the Bronx.

| Location | mi | km | Destinations | Notes |
|---|---|---|---|---|
| Norwood | 0.0 | 0.0 | Mosholu Parkway to Henry Hudson Parkway south / Saw Mill River Parkway north | Western terminus |
| Norwood | 0.3 | 0.48 | Jerome Avenue | |
| Norwood | 0.9 | 1.4 | Webster Avenue | Former NY 22 |
| Bronx Park | 1.0 | 1.6 | Bronx River Parkway – Sound View Park | Exit 9 on Bronx River Parkway |
| Olinville | 1.2 | 1.9 | White Plains Road | |
| Williamsbridge | 1.9 | 3.1 | US 1 (Boston Road) | |
| Baychester | 3.4 | 5.5 | I-95 south – George Washington Bridge, Trenton, NJ | Eastbound exit and westbound entrance; exit 10 on I-95 |
| Baychester | 3.5 | 5.6 | Hutchinson River Parkway south – Whitestone Bridge, Queens | Eastern terminus |
1.000 mi = 1.609 km; 1.000 km = 0.621 mi: Incomplete access
