= Bronx River Parkway =

Highway in New York

Bronx River Parkway
- Bronx River Parkway highlighted in red

Route information
- Maintained by NYSDOT and Westchester County
- Length: 19.12 mi (30.77 km)
- Existed: 1908–present
- History: Completed in 1925; extended northward in 1931 and southward in 1952
- Component highways: NY 907H (unsigned) in The Bronx; CR 9987 (unsigned) in Westchester County
- Tourist routes: New York State Scenic Byway
- Restrictions: No commercial vehicles

Major junctions
- South end: I-278 / Story Avenue in Soundview
- I-95 in Soundview; US 1 / Pelham Parkway in Bronx Park; Mosholu Parkway / Allerton Avenue in Bronx Park; Cross County Parkway in Yonkers; Sprain Brook Parkway in Yonkers; NY 100 / NY 119 in White Plains
- North end: NY 22 / Taconic State Parkway in North Castle

Location
- Country: United States
- State: New York
- Counties: Bronx, Westchester

Highway system
- New York Highways; Interstate; US; State; Reference; Parkways

The Bronx River Parkway (sometimes abbreviated as the Bronx Parkway) is a 19.12-mile (30.77 km) limited-access parkway in downstate New York in the United States. It is named for the nearby Bronx River, which it parallels. The southern terminus of the parkway is at Story Avenue near the Bruckner Expressway in the Bronx neighborhood of Soundview. The northern terminus is at Kensico Circle in North Castle, Westchester County, where the parkway connects to the Taconic State Parkway and via a short connector, New York State Route 22 (NY 22). Within the Bronx, the parkway is maintained by the New York State Department of Transportation and is designated New York State Route 907H (NY 907H), an unsigned reference route. In Westchester County, the parkway is maintained by the Westchester County Department of Public Works and is designated unsigned County Route 9987 (CR 9987).

Most of the exits on the parkway, including the traffic light-controlled intersections in Westchester County, have interchange numbers. The term "Bronx River Parkway" originally referred to the Bronx River Reservation, New York's first linear park, of which the road is a portion, from the Bronx–Westchester county line to Kensico Dam Plaza. Current usage of the term is confined to the roadway, but extends it to the portion which now continues southward beyond the Reservation. Its northern terminus ends with a rotary near the Kensico Dam with exits for the Taconic State Parkway and NY 22.

== Route description ==
The southern third of the parkway, in the Bronx, is exclusively controlled-access. It serves as a commuter route, intersecting several major east–west routes. Halfway through the borough it begins to closely parallel the Harlem Line of Metro-North Railroad, a pairing which continues to the road's northern terminus.

In Westchester County, the road continues to have the same character until the Sprain Brook Parkway splits off at Bronxville, allowing most through traffic to bypass White Plains. The stretches north of that junction have more of the original park character, and are still used that way. North of White Plains, all interchanges are at-grade intersections with traffic lights.

=== The Bronx ===
The parkway begins at Story Avenue in the neighborhood of Soundview in the Bronx, where two roadways merge near Metcalf and Morrison Avenues. Immediately to the north is the cloverleaf interchange at the Bruckner Expressway (Interstate 278 or I-278), where most traffic enters the parkway, which begins as a six-lane freeway. Basketball courts and baseball fields flank the highway in the strip of parkland as the road leads to the north, slightly northwestward. North of Watson Avenue, within a half-mile (1 km) of the southern terminus, an on-ramp carries northbound traffic from Metcalf. The corresponding offramp for southbound traffic merges onto Harrod Avenue north of Westchester Avenue. Now in West Farms, the Bronx River Parkway has an onramp to the southbound lanes from East 174th Street. North of it is exit 4, the interchange with the Cross Bronx Expressway (I-95). The single ramp of exit 5 allows southbound traffic to follow East 177th Street to NY 895 (Sheridan Boulevard) and the Triborough Bridge. North of the interchange the road veers to the northeast slightly and crosses the railroad tracks of Amtrak's Northeast Corridor line. At East 180th Street, the linear park ends temporarily. The road becomes elevated to cross the East 180th Street Yard along the New York City Subway's IRT White Plains Road Line, which carries the 2 and 5 services, as well as the former New York, Westchester and Boston Railway. After crossing the yard, wooded surroundings resume as the parkway follows the eastern edge of the Bronx Zoo in the Bronx Park neighborhood and the Bronx River, which gives the road its name, begins to follow it on the west. On the northbound side, as it enters the park, is an unnumbered exit allowing authorized vehicles (like those of people working at the NYC Parks Department) access to local streets via Birchall Avenue.

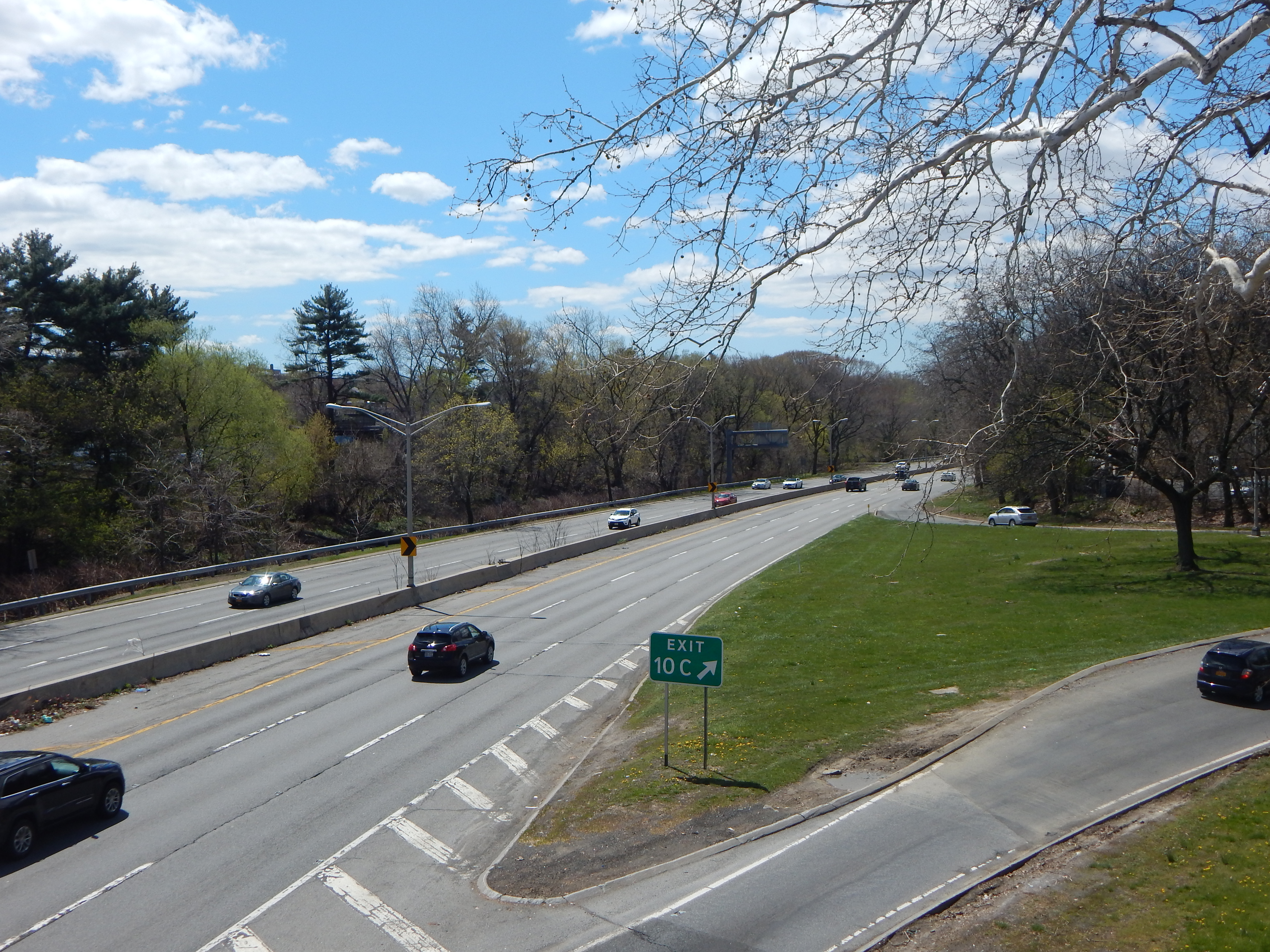
Bronx River Parkway southbound at exit 10C

A quarter-mile to the north is the main exit for the zoo at Boston Road, with access to Boston Road (U.S. Route 1 or US 1 northbound) for northbound traffic, then the full cloverleaf at Pelham Parkway, where traffic can join US 1 southbound on Fordham Road. Past the exit the large wooded area on the west is the New York Botanical Garden, a National Historic Landmark (NHL). One half-mile (1 km) further north, exit 8 allows access to the Mosholu Parkway and Allerton Avenue. At the next exit, Gun Hill Road, the Williamsbridge station serving that neighborhood on Metro-North Railroad's Harlem Line, which closely parallels the parkway from this point on, is located immediately west of the highway. The railroad tracks join the river and the parkland in paralleling the road north as it continues straight along the east edge of Woodlawn Cemetery, another NHL.

Almost a mile and a half (2.4 km) to the north, the Woodlawn station is located at the northeast corner of the cemetery next to the East 233rd Street exit. The highway bends left and then right again, crossing the river and the railroad, near the split along the tracks between the Harlem and New Haven lines immediately north of the station. After the curves, the Bronx River Parkway crosses the county line into Westchester County at the McLean Avenue/Nereid Avenue overpass and leaves the Bronx.

=== Westchester County ===
Once across the county line the parkway is in Yonkers, close to its boundary with Mount Vernon. A southbound exit, 10C, serves Bronx River Road at Wakefield Avenue near that train station a quarter-mile (500 m) north of the county line, even though the station is in the Bronx and the Harlem Line enters Westchester north of it. Northound traffic has 10A, for Mount Vernon Avenue and Yonkers Avenue at the Mount Vernon West station three-quarters of a mile (1.21 km) to the north. Another southbound exit, 10B, serves Bronx River Road just to the north at its Mile Square Road and Winfred Avenue intersections. The park widens around the highway as it bends slightly, heading even more to the northeast. Just past this is exit 11, the Cross County Parkway, where the road swings toward the east to allow space for the complex of onramps that also allow access to Broad Street and the Fleetwood station. A half-mile north of that junction, the parkland and the roadway narrow as Bronxville becomes the community on the opposite side of the Bronx River.

The parkway reaches an interchange with the southern terminus of the Sprain Brook Parkway and becomes a four-lane expressway, turning sharply to the northwest, away from the Harlem Line. The exit numbers reset here; the new exit 1, Paxton Avenue in Bronxville, is on the northbound lanes just north of the Sprain (exit 1A allows southbound traffic to leave the parkway for Desmond Avenue just before merging). Exit 2, West Pondfield Road, also northbound-only, is a thousand feet (300 m) to the north as the highway curves around downtown Bronxville to the east. Here, the road runs through the Armour Villa neighborhood until it runs under the Tuckahoe Road bridge. Almost a mile (1.6 km) separates it from the next exit, at Elm Street in Tuckahoe. The park continues to parallel the parkway, with paved bike paths and a large pond. A thousand feet to the north, Scarsdale Road is the first at-grade interchange, and the parkway turns sharply to the east, then back to the northeast more gradually. Exit 8, Thompson Street, serves the nearby Crestwood station as the Harlem Line's tracks begin to parallel the road again. Another three-quarter mile north, after the road has resumed its northeast course, comes the next at-grade exit, Leewood Drive, on the northbound side.

A quarter-mile (500 m) to the north are abandoned parking lots on both sides that were once gas stations. One-tenth of a mile (160 m) to the north, the roadways diverge and the river runs between them. Just beyond this is another at-grade interchange, Harney and Strathmore Roads. The roadways remain apart through a wooded section as they curve westward for the next three-quarter mile, returning to the highway's northeastern heading as it leaves Yonkers and briefly enters Greenburgh south of the southbound Ardsley Road exit east of downtown Scarsdale. Just after it curves eastward again and crosses the Harlem Line, entering Scarsdale, traffic can enter and exit at Crane Road and East Parkway with southbound traffic using a light to cross over the northbound lanes and no entrance onto the southbound lanes. In the next 2.2-mile (3.5 km) stretch, there are exits for Ogden and Butler Roads from the northbound lanes. Fenimore Road, just east of the Hartsdale and its train station, is a northbound exit with southbound entry. Just to its north, southbound traffic can exit onto Greenacres Avenue. The parkway begins heading even more to the northeast, the tracks immediately adjacent, past northbound exits for River and Claremont roads.

Just north of the latter exit, the highway enters White Plains, the Westchester county seat. After the northbound Walworth crossing exit, it turns northwest across the river and the tracks and then resumes its northeasterly course. A half-mile (1 km) north it reaches the Main Street (NY 119) northbound exit/southbound entrance, just west of the White Plains station on the west side of heavily developed downtown White Plains. It bends north and then northwest to the first of several at-grade intersections with traffic lights, also signed and numbered as exits, with Central Avenue (NY 100), at the Westchester County Center. From here, parkway traffic is also directed toward the nearby Cross Westchester Expressway (I-287) via NY 119, as the parkway has no direct interchange with it.

The two roadways once again diverge, becoming almost 400 feet (120 m) apart in the half-mile (1 km) before they converge again as they reach the Old Tarrytown Road intersection just north of the expressway. Beyond it the parkway goes due north before curving slightly into the Fisher Lane intersection just west of the last Metro-North station along the parkway, North White Plains. The Parkway Homes and Virginia Road intersections follow, spaced roughly a thousand feet (300 m) apart. Another thousand feet from that intersection, the highway turns to the northeast again as the roadways diverge and cross the Harlem Line and the Bronx River for the last time. Northbound traffic has the last exit, exit 27, onto Washington Avenue North. Kensico Dam is visible in the distance as the parkway reaches its northern terminus at Kensico Circle, southern terminus of the Taconic State Parkway, also listed on the Register.

A seven-mile (11 km) section of the Bronx River Parkway in Westchester County south of White Plains is closed to motorist traffic from 10 AM to 2 PM select Sundays in May, June, September and October (with the exception of Memorial and Labor Day weekends), allowing bicyclists to venture along the scenic road. Another section north of the one reserved for bicyclists is reserved for inline skating. This program is sponsored by Con Edison and NewYork-Presbyterian Hospital.

== History ==
Southern end of original parkway

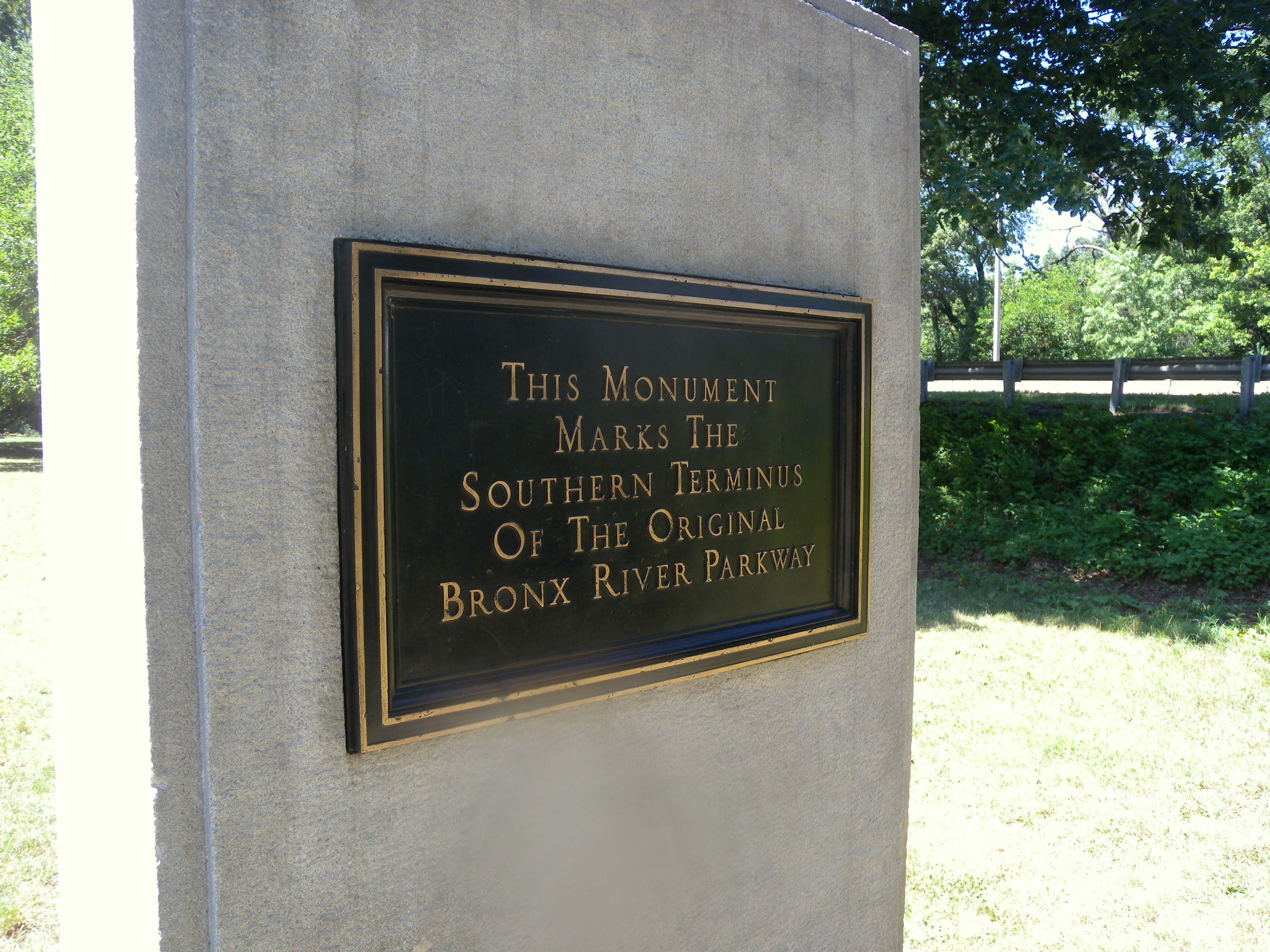
Plaque at 211th Street

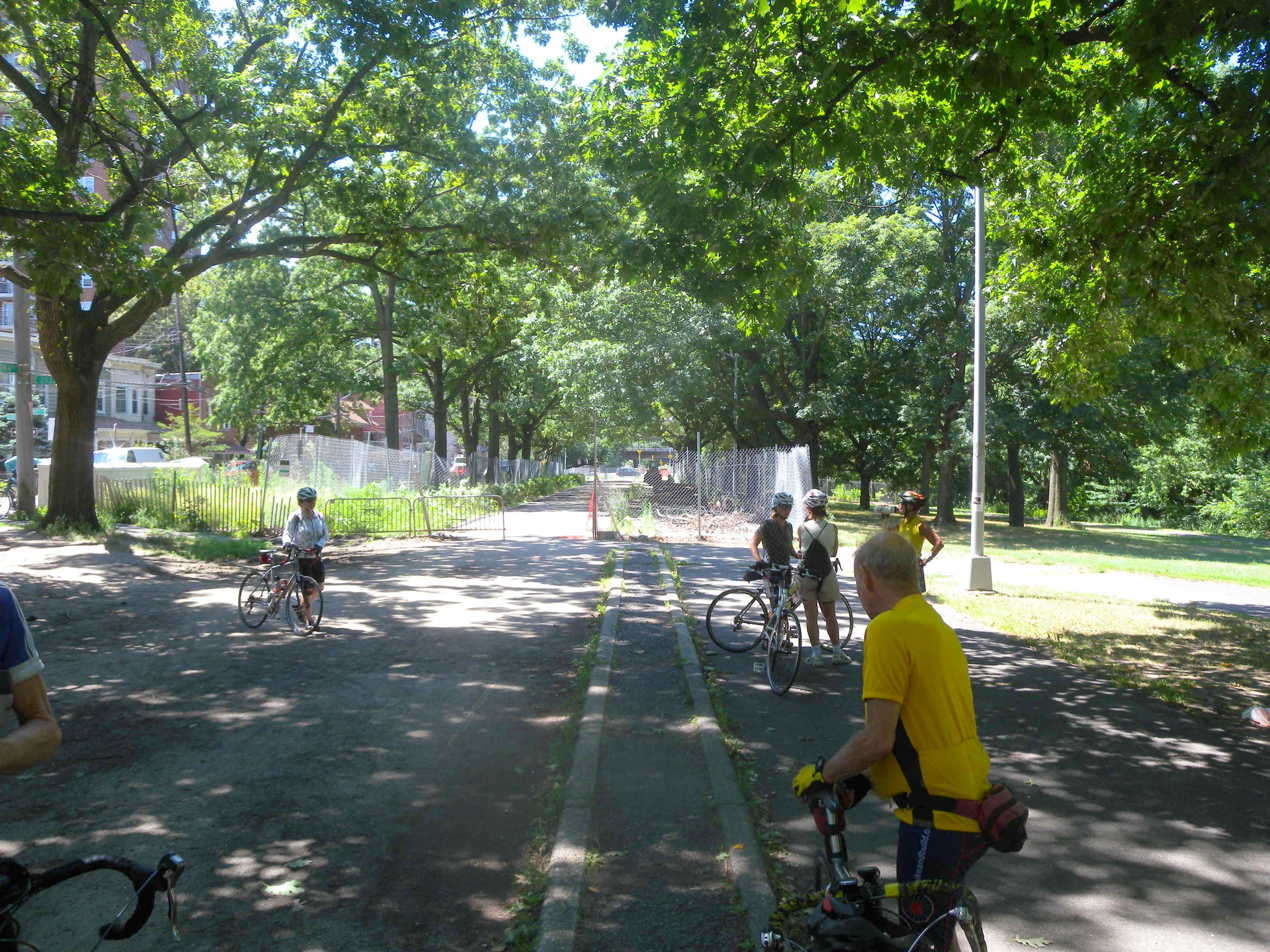
At 213th Street, looking south

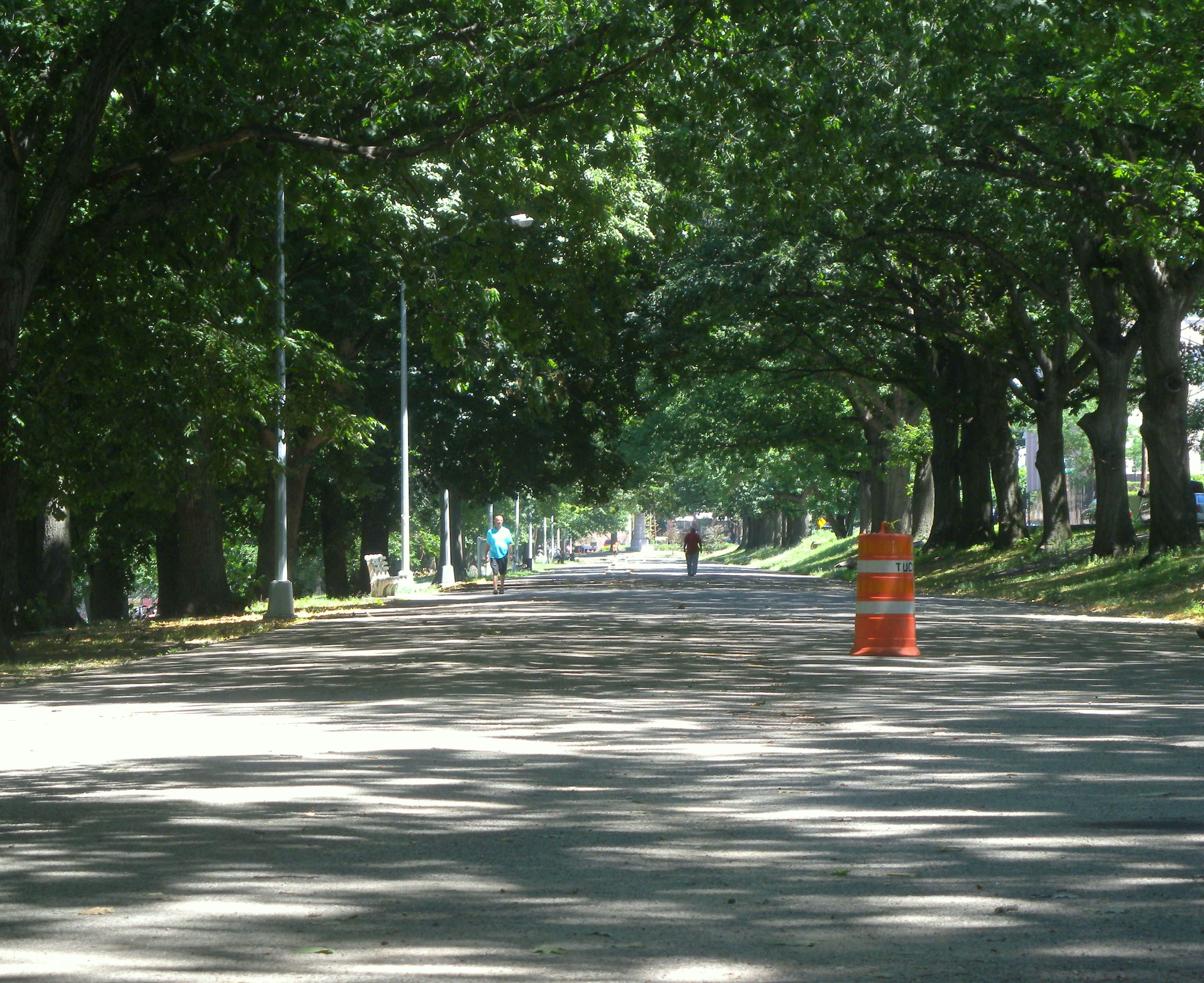
At 213th Street, looking north

Construction began in Westchester County in 1907, making it the earliest limited-access highway to start construction. However, although construction on the Long Island Motor Parkway began a year later, a section of the Long Island road opened for traffic before the end of 1908, opening before the Bronx River Parkway as the first limited-access highway to be put into use. Neither was up to current freeway standards, utilizing left turns across the opposing direction at access points. The Bronx River Parkway was the first highway to utilize a median strip to separate the opposing lanes, the first highway constructed through a park, and the first highway where intersecting streets crossed over bridges. Construction on the remainder of the portion in Westchester began in 1917, after almost a decade of delays. The first of this opened in 1922, with the last opened in 1925. This officially competed the highway as originally designed.

On January 1, 1926, with the parkway completed, maintenance of the Westchester County portion was transferred to the recently created Westchester County Parks Commission, while the Bronx portion had its maintenance transferred to the city of New York.

In 1927, the intersections with Palmer Road, Pondfield Road, Tuckahoe Road, and Ardsley Road were replaced by overpasses.

The intersection with Dewitt Avenue was known to be a safety hazard towards pedestrians since its opening. However, it would take until a person was killed in 1930 that a pedestrian operated traffic signal was installed. It was a success, as most pedestrians used it and drivers obeyed it.

In 1929, construction began on a northern extension of the road to the Croton Reservoir. In April 1931 steam shovels finally broke ground at Shrub Oak for the section built in Putnam County. Roosevelt and Moses both spoke at the ceremony, the former suggesting he still planned for the parkway to one day reach Canada. Eight months later the two rivals were at the north portal of the triple-hinged steel suspension bridge built over the reservoir, at 750 feet (230 m) the longest of that type in the world at the time, for the ribbon cutting ceremony. The next day, 20,000 cars took the new road from the city into the Manhattan Hills. Along the way were public picnic grounds in three areas, and 18 miles (29 km) of bridle paths in the median strip.

From 1927 to 1933, the East 233rd Street intersection was replaced by an interchange in order to increase capacity.

Rest stops along the portion in Westchester County were opened to traffic from 1930 to 1935 in an effort to better serve traveler needs. Two were right hand facilitates serving eastbound or westbound traffic only, while the other was a left hand facility serving both directions.

The road's northern terminus was truncated to NY 22 in 1941, with the existing portion replaced by an extension of the Taconic State Parkway.

A widening to six lanes and extension southward to the Bruckner Boulevard was considered starting after World War II. Construction began in 1948, and was completed on January 6, 1951.

In 1953, reconstruction and widening to six lanes began the 2.6-mile (4.2 km) segment between Bronxville and the Bronx. During this reconstruction period, a new overpass was built to serve the Cross County Parkway, with the ramps rebuilt into a partial cloverleaf interchange. Intersections in the area were also replaced by overpasses or grade separated interchanges. This was completed in February 1955.

In 1955, reconstruction and widening to six lanes began at the half mile stretch of the Parkway between the Woodland Viaduct and Scarsdale line. This was in part done to eliminate sharp dips and twists that had a negative effect on drivers. Work was completed in 1956.

In 1957, over 4,000 trees and shrubs were painted, lawns developed, and new rustic fences installed. This was done due to criticism by some that previous construction ruined the landscape.

In 1960, the exit and entrance on the northbound side between exits 5 and 6 in the Bronx, and an associated U-turn from southbound to northbound, was restricted to use only by police officers or employees of the Parks Department. This was to increase safety.

From 1960 to 1964, the portion between Tuckatoe Road and the Park Avenue Viaduct was rebuilt and widened to six lanes.

The portion in Butler Woods was reconstructed to eliminate sharp dips and twists as well as widened to six lanes, from 1967 to 1969. This was to eliminate negative impacts on drivers.

The rest area serving eastbound traffic only was reconstructed in 1972 after being damaged by a flood.

In the late 1960s, plans were made to extend the road southward to Soundview Park. However, this was canceled in 1974.

The interchange with the Cross County Parkway originally did not provide direct access to and from both directions of either. This was until that roads widening allowed the addition of extra ramps. Work was completed in 1978.

A pair of former rest areas on the outer margins of the roadway in Westchester near Crestwood, the southbound one is currently being used as a Westchester County Police Sub-Station, and the northbound used only as a tourist information stand. A rest stop formerly served both directions between Bronx exits 7 and 8. It was destroyed by a fire. Rather than being rebuilt, it was demolished, with the median in the area rebuilt. Both closed in 1980.

In 1991, 13 miles of road were added to the National Register of Historic Places.

The portion between the Westcheaster County line and northern terminus was designated as a New York Scenic Byway in 1992.

From 1992 to 1995, the first 3 miles of road was reconstructed an widened to six lanes. This was done to increase safety and reduce deterioration.

In 1995, it was discovered that the Woodland Viaduct was in a severe state of disrepair. Because of this, from 1997 to 2000, the structure was extensively rehabilitated. Also as part of this, a nearby portion of the mainline was rebuilt.

In 2009, the exit to Oak Street in Yonkers was closed and a new exit onto Yonkers Avenue was opened a block to the south.

After seven people died in an accident, improved median barriers were added to three viaducts along the road in 2012.

In 2012, a reconstruction project began on the portion in Scarsdale. This invoked widening lane width, installing guardrails, and reconstructing bridges. Work was completed in 2015.

In 2024, a new safety system was introduced to easily close low lying portions of the road in the event of a flood.

=== Westchester designation ===
The southernmost portion of the parkway in Westchester, south of the Sprain, is internally designated as NY 907G, an unsigned reference route, in apparent violation of the numbering standard. Ordinarily, the second digit should be the region. New York City and Long Island, regions 10 and 11, share 0; Westchester is region 8 (the Hutchinson River Parkway also shares this oddity). The section south of here is marked only with reference markers, and the section north only with county mileposts. This middle section has county mileposts in the middle, and reference markers with state mileposts (counting from the southern terminus in the Bronx, not the city line) alongside. However, Reference Route 907G is no longer listed in the NYSDOT traffic counts and the entirety of the parkway in the county is considered a county route by Westchester County.

The parkway was documented by the Historic American Engineering Record in 2001. Drawings and photographs from the documentation project were made available through the Westchester County Archives, winning an award of excellence from the Lower Hudson Conference.

== Exit list ==
County	Location	mi	km	Exit	Destinations	Notes
The Bronx	Soundview	0.00	0.00	1	Story Avenue – Soundview Park	Southern terminus; at-grade intersection
The Bronx	Soundview	0.2– 0.3	0.32– 0.48	2	I-278 (Bruckner Expressway) / Watson Avenue – RFK Bridge, Throgs Neck Bridge, Manhattan, New Haven, CT	Signed as exits 2E (I-278 east) and 2W (I-278 west); no northbound access to I-278 east; no southbound access to Watson Avenue
The Bronx	Soundview	0.5	0.80	3	Westchester Avenue	Southbound exit only
The Bronx	Soundview	0.86	1.38	4	I-95 (Cross Bronx Expressway) – Throgs Neck Bridge, George Washington Bridge	No southbound entrance; exit 4B on I-95
The Bronx	West Farms	1.1	1.8	5	East 177th Street to NY 895 south (Sheridan Boulevard) – RFK Bridge	Southbound exit only
The Bronx	Bronx Park	2.23	3.59	6	Boston Road to US 1 north – Bronx Zoo	
The Bronx	Bronx Park	2.40	3.86	7	US 1 (Fordham Road) / Pelham Parkway east	Signed as exits 7E (Pelham Parkway east) and 7W (US 1 south); western terminus of Pelham Parkway; no northbound access to US 1 north
The Bronx	Bronx Park	3.07	4.94	8	Mosholu Parkway north / Allerton Avenue	Signed as exits 8E (Allerton Avenue) and 8W (Mosholu Parkway); southern terminus of Mosholu Parkway
The Bronx	Williamsbridge	3.92	6.31	9	Gun Hill Road	
The Bronx	Wakefield	5.14	8.27	10	East 233rd Street	Access via Bronx Boulevard/Webster Avenue; former NY 22; serves Woodlawn station
Westchester	Yonkers	5.95	9.58	10C	Bronx River Road – Yonkers, Bronx	Southbound exit and entrance
Westchester	Yonkers	6.6	10.6	10A	Yonkers Avenue – Yonkers, Mount Vernon	Northbound exit and entrance; access via Mount Vernon Avenue
Westchester	Yonkers	7.0	11.3	10B	Bronx River Road – Yonkers	Southbound exit and entrance
Westchester	Yonkers	7.28– 7.84	11.72– 12.62	11	Cross County Parkway – Mount Vernon, Yonkers	Signed as exits 11E (Cross County Parkway east) and 11W (Cross County Parkway west); exit 6 on Cross County Parkway
Westchester	Yonkers	8.43– 8.5	13.57– 13.7	–	Sprain Brook Parkway north to Taconic State Parkway north	Northbound exit and southbound entrance; southern terminus of Sprain Brook Parkway
Westchester	Yonkers	8.43– 8.5	13.57– 13.7	Northern end of freeway section		
Westchester	Yonkers	8.43– 8.5	13.57– 13.7	1A	Desmond Avenue – Yonkers	Southbound exit and northbound entrance
Westchester	Yonkers	8.7	14.0	1	Paxton Avenue – Bronxville	No southbound exit
Westchester	Yonkers	8.9	14.3	2	West Pondfield Road – Bronxville, Yonkers	Northbound exit only
Westchester	Yonkers	9.7	15.6	3	Elm Street – Tuckahoe	Northbound exit and entrance
Westchester	Yonkers	9.92	15.96	4	Scarsdale Road – Tuckahoe, Yonkers	At-grade intersection
Westchester	Yonkers	10.1	16.3	6	Read Avenue – Crestwood	No entrance ramps
Westchester	Yonkers	10.6	17.1	8	Thompson Street / Vermont Terrace – Crestwood Station	Signed for Thompson Street northbound, Vermont Terrace southbound
Westchester	Yonkers	11.15	17.94	9	Leewood Drive – Eastchester	At-grade intersection except northbound exit
Westchester	Yonkers	11.87	19.10	10	Harney Road / Strathmore Road – Eastchester, Yonkers	At-grade intersection
Westchester	Greenburgh	12.6	20.3	11	Ardsley Road – Greenburgh	Southbound exit and entrance
Westchester	Scarsdale	12.88	20.73	12	Crane Road – Scarsdale	At-grade intersection except northbound exit; no southbound entrance
Westchester	Scarsdale	13.3	21.4	13	Ogden Road – Scarsdale	Northbound exit and entrance
Westchester	Scarsdale	13.8	22.2	14	Butler Road – Scarsdale	Northbound exit and entrance
Westchester	Scarsdale	14.2	22.9	15	Fenimore Road / East Hartsdale Avenue – Hartsdale, Scarsdale	Northbound exit and southbound entrance
Westchester	Scarsdale	14.4	23.2	16	Greenacres Avenue – Hartsdale, Scarsdale	Southbound exit only
Westchester	Scarsdale	15.1	24.3	17	River Road – Scarsdale	Northbound entrance only
Westchester	Scarsdale	15.2	24.5	18	Claremont Road – Scarsdale	Northbound at-grade intersection
Westchester	White Plains	15.46	24.88	19	Walworth Avenue – White Plains	Northbound at-grade intersection; access via Walworth Crossing
Westchester	White Plains	16.06– 16.4	25.85– 26.4	21	NY 119 (Main Street) – White Plains	Signed for NY 119 southbound, Main Street northbound; no northbound access to NY 119 west
Westchester	White Plains	16.5	26.6	22	NY 100 / NY 119 – White Plains	At-grade intersection; access via Central Avenue
Westchester	Greenburgh	17.2	27.7	23	Old Tarrytown Road – Greenburgh	At-grade intersection
Westchester	Greenburgh	17.84	28.71	24	Fisher Lane – Greenburgh, North White Plains	At-grade intersection
Westchester	Greenburgh	18.1	29.1	25	Parkway Homes Road	At-grade intersection
Westchester	Greenburgh	18.37	29.56	26	Virginia Road – Greenburgh, Mount Pleasant, North Castle	At-grade intersection
Westchester	North Castle	18.8	30.3	27	Lafayette Avenue / Washington Avenue – North Castle	Northbound exit and entrance
Westchester	North Castle	18.9	30.4	–	NY 22 north – North Castle	No southbound exit
Westchester	North Castle	18.9	30.4	–	Broadway – Kensico Dam Plaza	No southbound exit
Westchester	North Castle	18.94	30.48	–	Taconic State Parkway north – Albany	Continuation beyond Kensico Circle
1.000 mi = 1.609 km; 1.000 km = 0.621 mi: Incomplete access

== See also ==
- List of county routes in Westchester County, New York
- National Register of Historic Places listings in Bronx County, New York
- National Register of Historic Places listings in northern Westchester County, New York
- National Register of Historic Places listings in southern Westchester County, New York
