= Webster Avenue =

Avenue in the Bronx, New York

Coordinates: 40°51′50.97″N 73°53′17.74″W

- Maintained by: NYCDOT
- Length: 5.8 mi (9.3 km)
- Component highways: US 1 from Tremont to Belmont
- Location: Bronx
- South end: Melrose Avenue in Melrose
- Major junctions: I-95 / US 1 in Tremont; Bronx River Parkway / East 233rd Street in Woodlawn
- North end: Bronx River Road at the Woodlawn–Yonkers line

Webster Avenue is a major north–south thoroughfare in the Bronx, New York City, United States. It stretches for 5.8 miles (9.3 km) from Melrose, where it begins as a continuation of Melrose Avenue, to the Bronx–Westchester county line, where it continues north as Bronx River Road. There are no subway lines along this thoroughfare, unlike the streets it parallels—Jerome Avenue, The Grand Concourse, and White Plains Road, which all have subway lines (the IRT Jerome Avenue Line, IND Concourse Line, and IRT White Plains Road Line, respectively)—but until 1973, Webster Avenue north of Fordham Road was served by the Third Avenue Elevated, served by the 8 train.

== History ==
Webster Avenue was surveyed after the Civil War and lengthened in 1879 and 1882. According to the History in Asphalt book published by The Bronx County Historical Society, it is likely that the street was named after Department of Public Works engineer Albert L. Webster and/or surveyor Joseph O. B. Webster, who were both involved with the project to lengthen the street in the nineteenth century.

== Route description ==
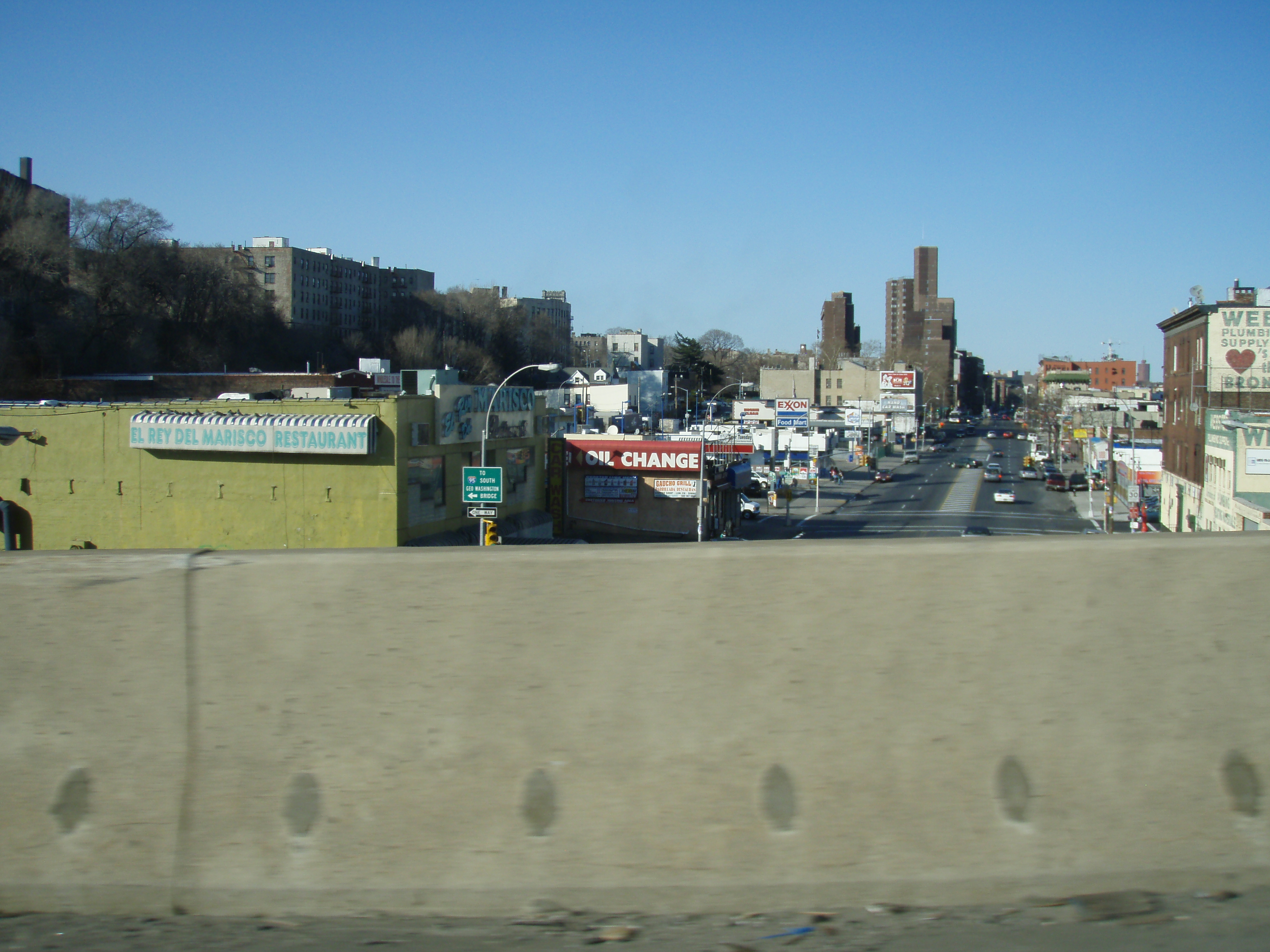
Webster Avenue in Tremont, as seen from Cross Bronx Expressway

Webster Avenue, which is wide for most of its length, begins as a continuation of Melrose Avenue in Melrose. It begins in a northward direction, parallelling the Metro-North railroad tracks and Brook Avenue. After about 0.2 miles (0.32 km), East 167th Street intersects Webster Avenue and changes from a two-way road to one-way going westward. At Claremont Parkway, the still parallel Brook Avenue comes to an end, and Webster Avenue continues north. At 1.2 miles (1.9 km), the Cross Bronx Expressway passes over Webster Avenue. East Tremont Avenue (East 177th Street) intersects it soon afterward, in the eastern section of Tremont. Most of the southern half of Webster Avenue is concurrent with US 1.

Webster Avenue continues northerly by entering the eastern portion of the Fordham neighborhood. In Fordham, it forms a large intersection at Fordham Plaza with Decatur Avenue, East Fordham Road, and Third Avenue, across the street from Fordham University's Rose Hill campus. Decatur Avenue then parallels Webster Avenue on its west side as both roads continue north. Bedford Park Boulevard (East 200th Street) then intersects Webster Avenue in Bedford Park as it heads further north towards Woodlawn. Soon after the intersection with Bedford Park Boulevard (East 200th Street), Mosholu Parkway crosses over Webster Avenue, and then Gun Hill Road intersects it. Webster Avenue then intersects with East 233rd Street and the Bronx River Parkway in Woodlawn, before becoming Bronx River Road as it enters Westchester County.

== Transportation ==
The Metro-North Railroad's Harlem Line has several stations along Webster Avenue: Fordham station at Fordham Road; Botanical Garden station at Bedford Park Boulevard; and Williams Bridge station at Gun Hill Road. Additionally, the New York City Subway’s IRT Jerome Avenue Line (4 train), IND Concourse Line (B and D trains), and IRT White Plains Road Line (2 and 5 trains), serve the avenue.

The following New York City Bus routes serve Webster:

- The Bx41 and Bx41 SBS are the main buses, serving it south of East Gun Hill Road.
- The River Park Towers-bound Bx40 and Bx42 run from East 180th Street to East 178th Street.
- The Bx35 runs between East 167th and East 168th Streets.
- The Bx16 serves the avenue north of East 233rd Street.

=== Incidents ===
On March 29, 1936, a trolley on Webster Avenue crashed into a new automobile at 209th Street. The crash hurt 20 people, 12 of whom were rushed to Fordham Hospital.

== Major intersections ==
County	Location	mi	km	Destinations	Notes
The Bronx	Melrose	0.0	0.0	Melrose Avenue	Continuation south
The Bronx	Tremont	1.2	1.9	I-95 south / US 1 south (Cross Bronx Expressway) – George Washington Bridge	Southern end of US 1 concurrency; exit 2B on I-95
The Bronx	Tremont	1.5	2.4	East Tremont Avenue	
The Bronx	Belmont	2.6	4.2	US 1 north (Fordham Road)	Northern end of US 1 concurrency
The Bronx	Norwood	4.2	6.8	Gun Hill Road	
The Bronx	Woodlawn	5.4– 5.5	8.7– 8.9	Bronx River Parkway / East 233rd Street – Sound View Park	Exit 10 on Bronx River Parkway
Bronx–Westchester county line	Woodlawn–Yonkers line	5.8	9.3	Bronx River Road	Continuation north
1.000 mi = 1.609 km; 1.000 km = 0.621 mi: Concurrency terminus
