= Woodlawn station (Metro-North) =

Metro-North Railroad station in the Bronx, New York

Woodlawn
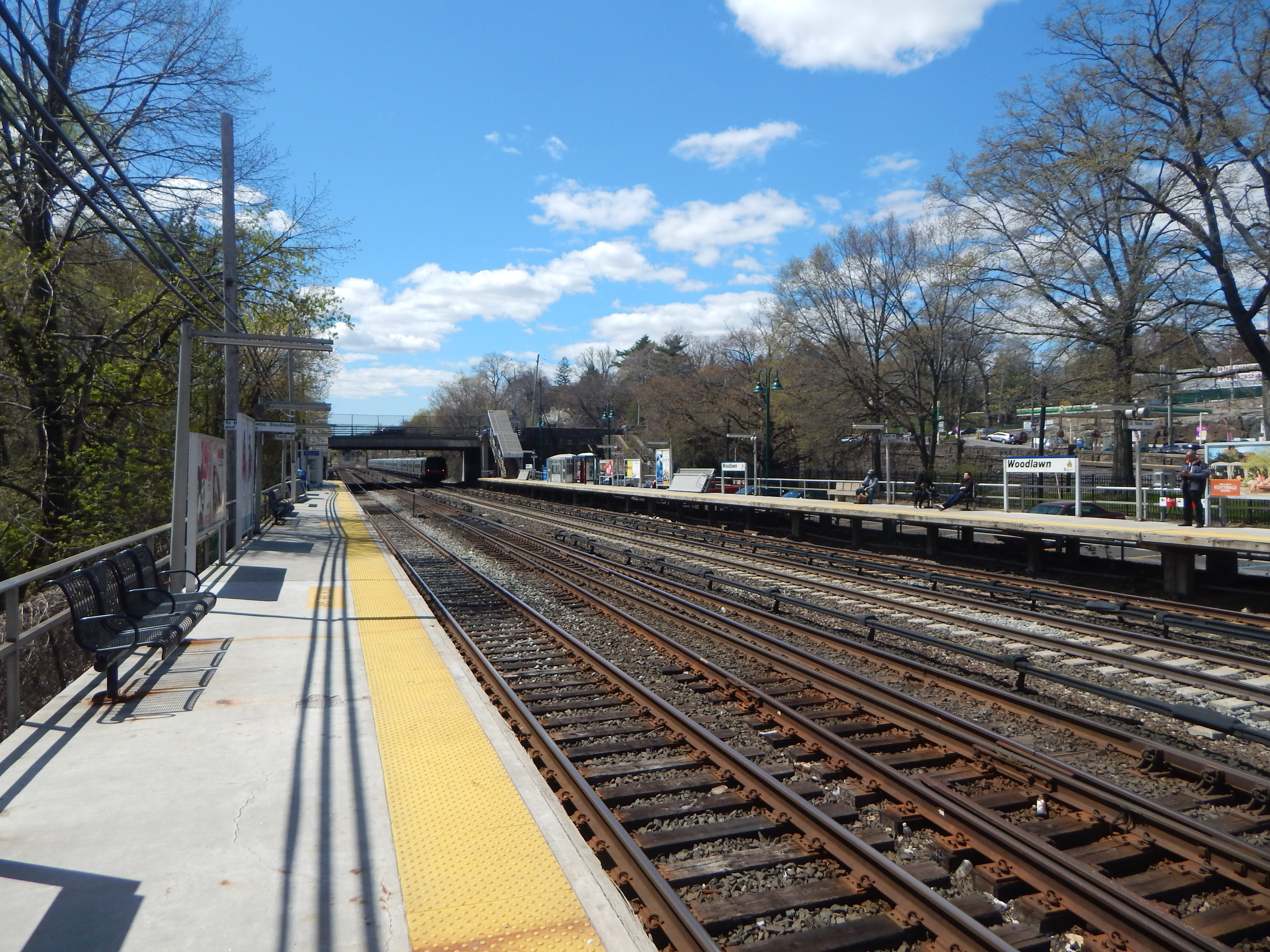
- Woodlawn station in April 2015 from the outbound platform.

General information
- Location: 555 East 233rd Street; Woodlawn, Bronx, New York
- Coordinates: 40.8955°N 73.8628°W
- Owner: Metro-North Railroad
- Line: Harlem Line
- Platforms: 2 side platforms
- Tracks: 4
- Connections: New York City Subway: at 233rd Street New York City Bus: Bx16, Bx31

Construction
- Parking: Yes (metered and private)

Other information
- Fare zone: 2

History
- Electrified: 700V (DC) third rail

Passengers
- 2018: 1,942 (Metro-North)
- Rank: 33 of 109

Services
Preceding station	Metro-North Railroad	Following station
Williams Bridge toward Grand Central	Harlem Line	Wakefield toward North White Plains
New Haven Line does not stop here

Former services
Preceding station	New York Central Railroad	Following station
Williams Bridge toward New York	Harlem Division	Wakefield toward Chatham
Location

Woodlawn station (also known as Woodlawn–East 233rd Street station) is a commuter rail stop on the Metro-North Railroad's Harlem Line, serving the Woodlawn section of the Bronx, New York City. It is located on East 233rd Street near Webster Avenue. Just north of the station is Woodlawn Junction, where the New Haven Line splits from the Harlem Line to join the Northeast Corridor.

== History ==
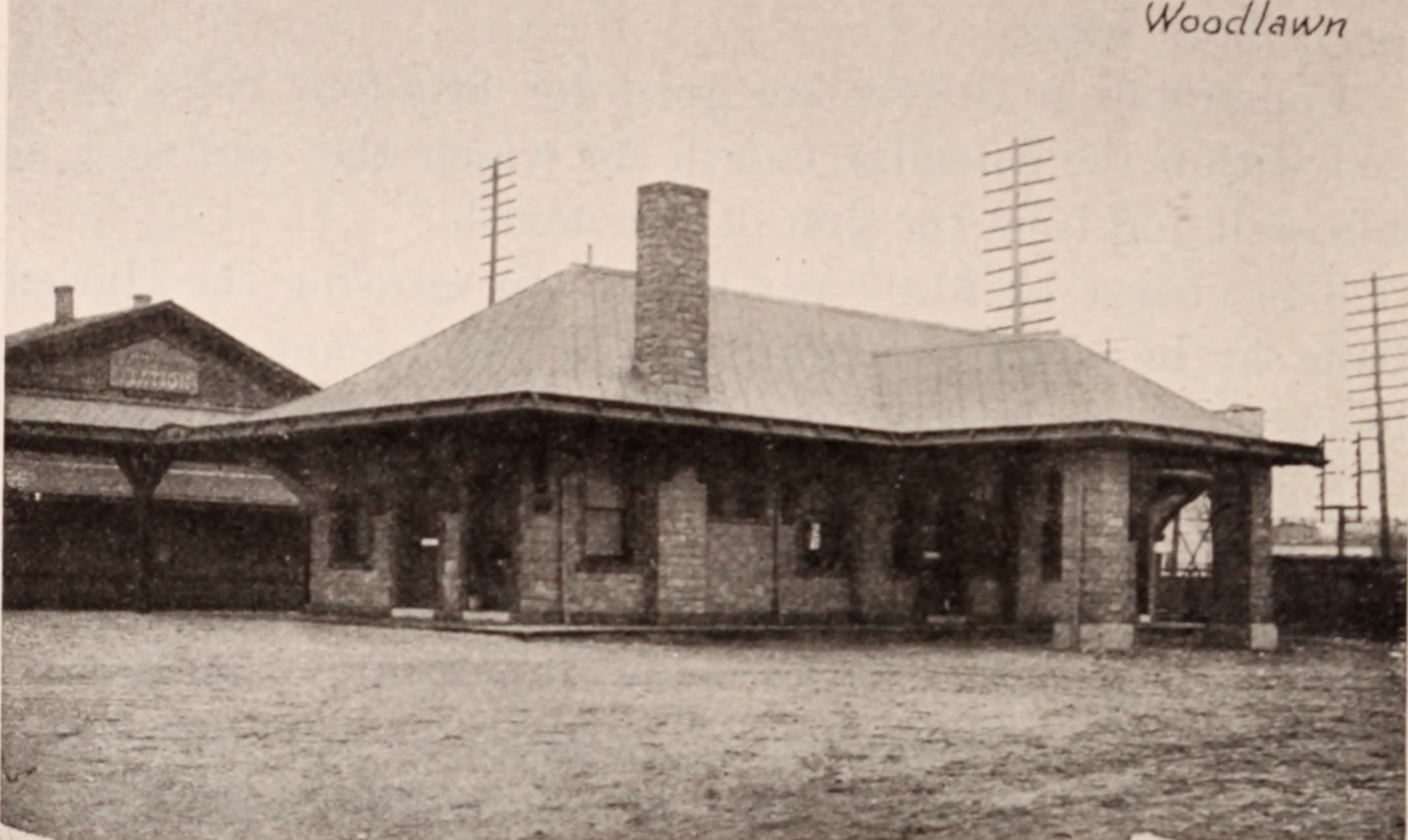
Woodlawn station in 1897

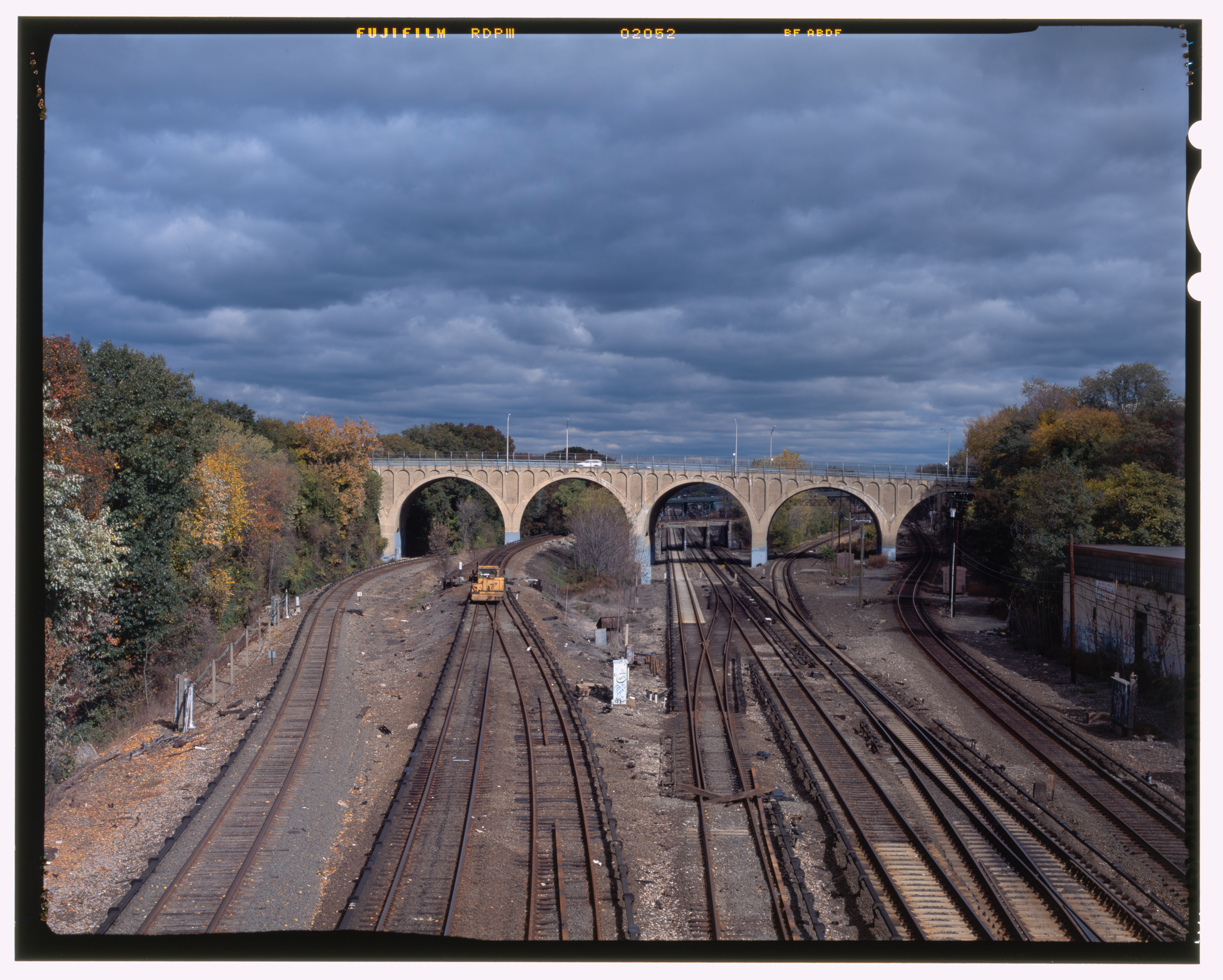
Woodlawn Junction in 2001

The New York and Harlem Railroad laid tracks through Woodlawn during the mid-1840s as part of their effort to expand the line to Tuckahoe. A March 17, 1848 agreement gave the New York and New Haven Railroad trackage rights over the NY&H from Williamsbridge south into New York City. Service was shared by the NY&H as well as the NY&NH, which was merged with the Hartford and New Haven Railroad to form the New York, New Haven and Hartford Railroad in 1872, and the trackage rights along the Harlem Division remained intact. Throughout the late-19th Century, the Harlem Division was widened and rebuilt into an open cut line as part of a grade elimination project, and Woodlawn Station was one of several in the Bronx that were rebuilt with a station house on a bridge over all four tracks, including Fordham, Melrose, the former Morrisania and Tremont stations. The expansion of the line in the Bronx, prompted the New York Central and New Haven Railroads to convert the Woodlawn Junction into a flyover bridge between 1910 and 1915. Modifications were made to the junction in later years, most recently by Metro-North in 1986.

Due to the popularity of football games between the Fordham Rams and Yale Bulldogs in the 1920s, joint service between the New York Central Railroad and New York, New Haven and Hartford was moved from Woodlawn to Fordham Station. Nevertheless, the station remained active. The realignment of the Bronx River Parkway between 1953 and 1955 converted the southbound lanes into off and on ramps to East 233rd Street via Webster Avenue. The northbound lanes were partially converted into a small parking lot for the station.

As with other NYC stations in the Bronx, the station became a Penn Central station once the NYC & Pennsylvania Railroads merged in 1968. Penn Central acquired the New Haven Railroad in 1969, but the New Haven continued to stop only at Fordham station. However, because of the railroad's serious financial distress following the merger, commuter service was turned over to the Metropolitan Transportation Authority in 1972. The station house which was built over the tracks survived well into the 1970s. The station became part of Metro-North Railroad in 1983.

Until the 1990s, Woodlawn served as the changeover point between catenary and third rail for New Haven Line trains and have done so since 1907. This would be replaced by third rail and would be extended past Woodlawn Junction, moving the end of the catenary wires to a location between the Mount Vernon East and Pelham stations.

In April 2014, Metro North installed a series of solar-powered electronic kiosks at the station that allowed commuters to access train and bus schedules without using internet access. In June 2025, the MTA began adding elevators to the Woodlawn station as part of a project that also replaced elevators at the Botanical Garden station and added elevators to the Williams Bridge station.

== Station layout ==
The station has two high-level side platforms, each four cars long. When trains stop at the station, normally the front four open cars receive and discharge passengers. Both platforms are accessible by stairway from East 233rd Street, and the western platform also accesses the station's parking lot on Webster Avenue, as well as the southbound Bronx River Parkway service road.
