= Armour Villa, Yonkers =

Coordinates: 40°56′58″N 73°49′54″W

Armour Villa is a neighborhood in Northeast Yonkers, New York, that shares a postal zip code with the town of Bronxville, New York.

It lies west of the Bronx River Parkway, between Tuckahoe Road and Pondfield Road West. Although part of the City of Yonkers, Armour Villa is just over the border from the Village of Bronxville. Along with several adjoining Yonkers neighborhoods, it has a Bronxville ZIP code.

The neighborhood was incorporated in 1889 as the Armour Villa Park Association. The investors who formed the association purchased the property from a man named Cornelius Smith for $39,000; Smith had purchased the land nine years earlier for only $6,500.

Cornelius Smith had a son named H. Armour Smith, which has led to speculation of some kind of connection (a relative or an investor) between Smith and Herman O. Armour, who was the head of the New York House of Armour Meat Packing Company.

The New York Times reported that several of Armour Villa's houses date to its earliest days. Nancy Little's house, an Arts and Crafts Victorian farmhouse, was built in 1890. The majority of the homes – mostly Tudors, Colonials, and Victorians – were built in the 1920s and 1930s, and are priced from $500,000 to the low $900,000's. There are also a handful of houses priced in the Millions. Interspersed with the older houses are ranches, mostly built in the 1960s and 1970s.
