= Yonkers Avenue =

Highway in New York

- Maintained by: NYSDOT
- Length: 3.22 mi (5.18 km)
- Location: Yonkers, New York
- West end: Nepperhan Avenue
- Major junctions: Saw Mill River Parkway / Cross County Parkway; Cross County Parkway; I-87 / New York Thruway
- East end: Bronx River Parkway / Bronx River Road / Mount Vernon Avenue

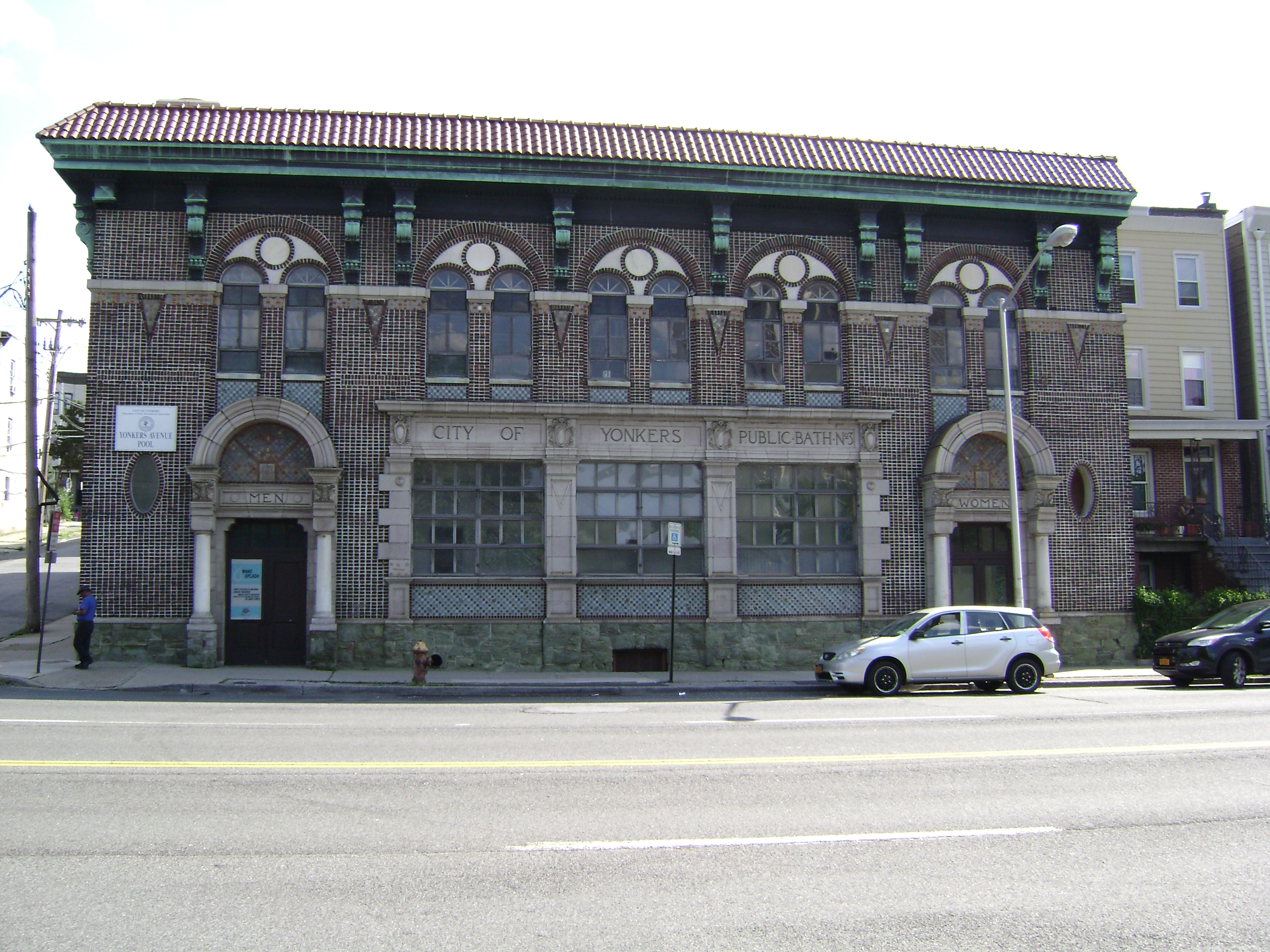
Public Bath House No. 3, 48 Yonkers Avenue

Yonkers Avenue is an east–west street in the city of Yonkers in Westchester County, New York, in the United States. It is one of four major east–west through routes in the city. The western terminus of the street is at Nepperhan Avenue (NY 983B), which connects to U.S. Route 9 (US 9) and New York State Route 9A (NY 9A). Its eastern terminus is at Bronx River Road and the Bronx River Parkway. The entirety of Yonkers Avenue is maintained by the New York State Department of Transportation as New York State Route 983C from Nepperhan Avenue to the Saw Mill River Parkway and New York State Route 984E from the Saw Mill River Parkway to Bronx River Road. Both are unsigned reference route designations.

A continuation of Yonkers Avenue east into Mount Vernon is signed as "To Mount Vernon Avenue" for the street it connects to on the opposite bank of the Bronx River. The bridge carrying the street over the Bronx River Parkway and the Bronx River is maintained by Westchester County and the 0.02-mile (0.03 km) long portion in Mount Vernon is designated but not signed as County Route 66A (CR 66A).

== Major intersections ==
The entire route is in Yonkers, Westchester County.

mi	km	Destinations	Notes
0.00	0.00	Nepperhan Avenue	Western terminus
0.71	1.14	Saw Mill River Parkway / Cross County Parkway east	No westbound access to SMP south/CCP; exit 5 on Saw Mill Parkway; Cross County Parkway not signed
1.20	1.93	Cross County Parkway east	Exit 3 on Cross County Parkway
2.10	3.38	I-87 south (New York Thruway) To I-87 north (New York Thruway)	Access via Central Park Avenue; exit 2 on I-87 / Thruway
3.22	5.18	Bronx River Parkway north / Bronx River Road / Mount Vernon Avenue	Eastern terminus; exit 10A on Bronx River Parkway
1.000 mi = 1.609 km; 1.000 km = 0.621 mi: Incomplete access

== See also ==
- List of county routes in Westchester County, New York
- List of reference routes in New York
