= Cross County Parkway =

Highway in New York

Cross County Parkway
- Cross County Parkway highlighted in red

Route information
- Maintained by NYSDOT
- Length: 4.46 mi (7.18 km)
- Existed: 1947–present
- Restrictions: No commercial vehicles or drivers with learner's permits

Major junctions
- West end: Saw Mill River Parkway in Yonkers
- I-87 / New York Thruway / NY 100 in Yonkers; Bronx River Parkway in Yonkers; NY 22 in Mount Vernon; Hutchinson River Parkway in Mount Vernon
- East end: Hutchinson River Parkway in Eastchester

Location
- Country: United States
- State: New York
- Counties: Westchester

Highway system
- New York Highways; Interstate; US; State; Reference; Parkways

The Cross County Parkway (CCP) is a 4.46-mile (7.18 km) controlled-access parkway in lower Westchester County, New York, in the United States. The parkway is a critical east–west connection throughout Westchester, having full interchanges with every major north–south highway in southern Westchester with the exception of Interstate 95 (New England Thruway). Among its junctions, it has access to the New York State Thruway mainline. The western terminus is at the Saw Mill Parkway in Yonkers. The eastern terminus is at the Hutchinson River Parkway in Eastchester.

As evident from stubs and oversized overpasses, it appears that there were plans to expand the Parkway west from exit 2 to Downtown Yonkers and east from exit 9 to I-95. World War II had slowed this idea until it was shelved. The CCP is the only parkway in New York state that has express and local lanes. The parkway is designated New York State Route 907K (NY 907K), an unsigned reference route.

== Route description ==
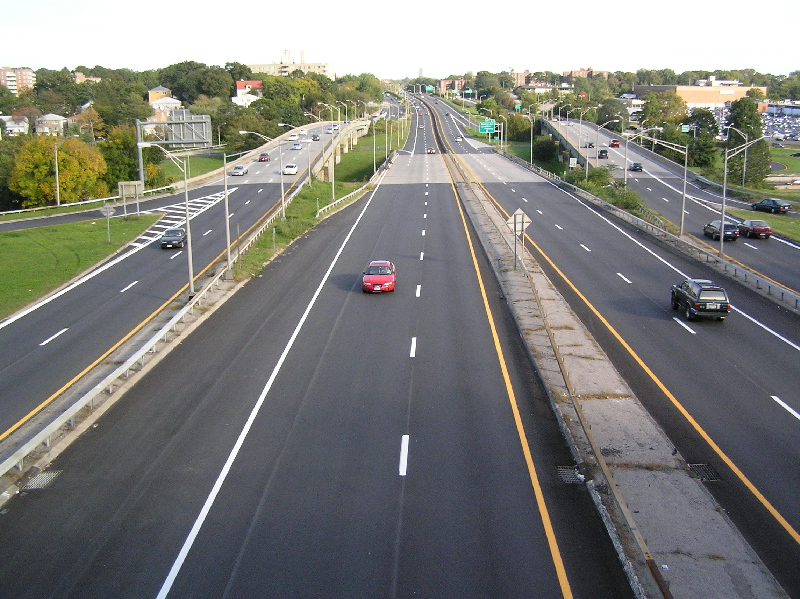
The Cross County Parkway looking east from the Murray Avenue bridge in Yonkers, near exit 4S

The Cross County Parkway begins at an interchange with the Saw Mill River Parkway in Yonkers. Exits 1 and 2 are part of this interchange, with exit 1 being a westbound only exit to Rumsey Road, and exit 2 being a westbound exit/eastbound entrance from the Saw Mill northbound. The entrance/exit at the Saw Mill southbound has no number. After crossing an abandoned railroad grade, the parkway enters exit 3, a small interchange with Yonkers Avenue. The six-lane roadway crosses through southeast Yonkers, making a gradual bend from the northeast to the southeast before spitting into express and local lanes. The parkway then enters an interchange with the New York State Thruway (I-87) and NY 100, exits 4S (for I-87 south) and 4N (for I-87 north/NY-100 north). All exits/entrances are accessed here by the local lanes, except for the eastbound exit and westbound entrance at exit 4N, which are via the express lanes. The eastbound entrance at exit 4N connects to both the express and local lanes. Shortly after, the Cross County enters exit 5, which connects to Kimball Avenue and Midland Avenue and is only accessed by the local lanes. There is no eastbound entrance.

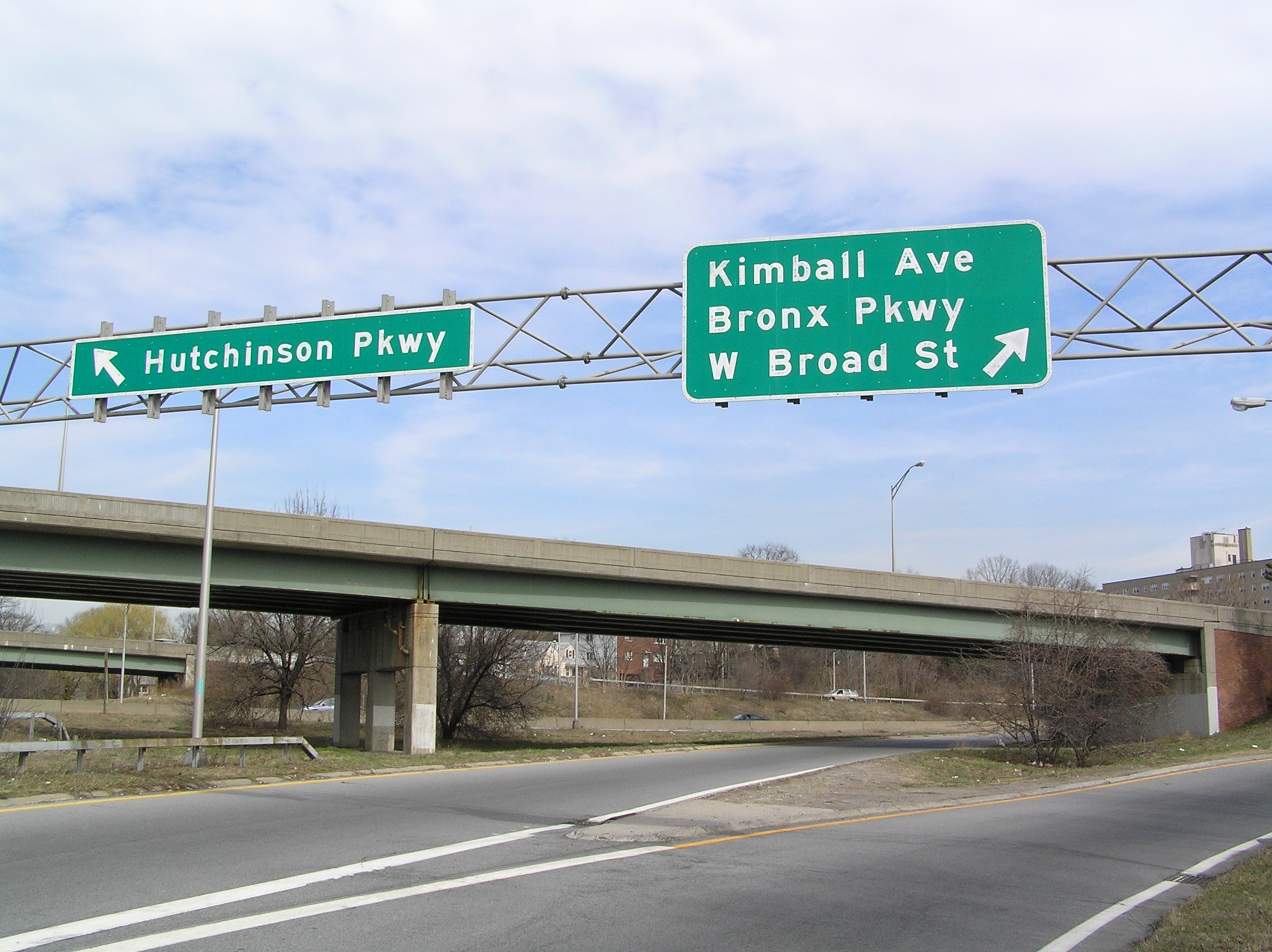
Eastbound entrance to the Cross County at exit 4N in Yonkers. Cars can bear left for the express lanes for exits 8 and up, or bear right for the local lanes for exits 5, 6, and 7.

Continuing east through Yonkers, the Cross County Parkway enters an interchange with the Bronx River Parkway and Sprain Brook Parkway, exit 6. In the center of this interchange, consisting of several flyover ramps, is the Fleetwood Metro-North Railroad station on the Harlem Line. Immediately after exit 6, the Cross County crosses into Mount Vernon where it meets exit 7, a northbound entrance and exit via the local lanes at Broad Street, which connects to Gramatan Avenue. After exit 7, the parkway winds southeast into the Chester Heights section of Mount Vernon, where it enters exit 8 for NY 22 (North Columbus Avenue). Just east of exit 8, the Cross County has an eastbound exit and westbound entrance at exit 9, which connects the parkway to/from the southbound lanes of the Hutchinson River Parkway at exit 13.

Immediately after exit 9, the Cross County Parkway turns ninety degrees to the north, going back to a six-lane parkway after briefly expanding to host exit 9. The Cross County parallels a park in the Chester Heights section of Mount Vernon. Entering Eastchester, the parkway enters exit 10, a small interchange with New Rochelle Road with only an eastbound exit and westbound entrance. This is because the eastbound entrance and westbound exit are via the Hutch. After exit 10, the Cross County continues north as a five-lane parkway (three lanes westbound, two lanes eastbound), before crossing under a flyover ramp for the Hutchinson River Parkway southbound and merging into the parkway northbound.

== History ==
The Cross County Parkway was originally built as an east–west link between the Saw Mill, Bronx River, and Hutchinson River Parkways. Construction began in 1929, and the highway was initially a 40-foot (12 m)-wide undivided roadway that could accommodate four lanes of automobile traffic (two in each direction). The final portion o the road was completed in 1947.

The parkway had a toll barrier in Fleetwood, which was removed in the early 1950s.

Exit 6 was rebuilt from 1955 to 1957 as part of modernization efforts on the Bronx River Parkway.

Cross County Parkway was originally planned to be extended to the Rye Playland Parkway. However this proposal was stalled by the Great Depression and Second World War, and finally cancelled in the 1970s. Part of the right of way for the Cross County Parkway's unbuilt extension has since been incorporated into the Leatherstocking Trail.

A major widening of the Cross County Parkway began in 1964; however, the project was not completed until 1984. The parkway is now a multi-lane highway with express and local lanes.

In conjunction with the renovation of the Cross County Shopping Center, Exit 5 westbound and Exit 5 eastbound of the Cross County Parkway underwent major reconstruction during 2010 and 2011. The two exit ramps were widened and improved with new traffic lights and signage. In addition, traffic can now proceed from the eastbound parkway directly into the shopping center.

== Exit list ==
The entire route is in Westchester County.

Location	mi	km	Exit	Destinations	Notes
Yonkers	0.00	0.00	–	Saw Mill River Parkway south – New York City	Western terminus
Yonkers	0.20	0.32	1	Rumsey Road	Westbound exit only
Yonkers	0.40	0.64	2	Saw Mill River Parkway north – Albany	Westbound exit and eastbound entrance; exit 4 on Saw Mill River Parkway
Yonkers	0.75	1.21	3	Yonkers Avenue / Midland Avenue	No westbound entrance; no westbound access to Yonkers Ave. west; Midland Ave. not signed westbound
Yonkers	1.20	1.93	West end of local/express lane division		
Yonkers	1.60	2.57	4	I-87 / New York Thruway / Central Park Avenue (NY 100 north) – New York City, Albany	Signed as exits 4S (south) and 4N (north); exit 4 on I-87 / Thruway
Yonkers	2.10	3.38	5	Kimball Avenue / Midland Avenue	No eastbound entrance
Yonkers	2.40	3.86	East end of local/express lane division (westbound)		
Yonkers	2.50	4.02	6	Bronx River Parkway to Sprain Brook Parkway north	Exits 11E-W on Bronx River Parkway
Mount Vernon	2.60	4.18	7	West Broad Street / Gramatan Avenue	Eastbound exit and entrance
Mount Vernon	2.80	4.51	East end of local/express lane division (eastbound)		
Mount Vernon	3.50	5.63	8	NY 22 (North Columbus Avenue) – Mount Vernon, Eastchester	
Mount Vernon	3.70	5.95	9	Hutchinson River Parkway south – Whitestone Bridge	Eastbound exit and westbound entrance; exit 6B on Hutchinson River Parkway
Eastchester	4.20	6.76	10	New Rochelle Road – Eastchester	Eastbound exit and westbound entrance
Eastchester	5.50	8.85	–	Hutchinson River Parkway north to Merritt Parkway north (Route 15 north)	Eastern terminus; exit 8 on Hutchinson River Parkway
1.000 mi = 1.609 km; 1.000 km = 0.621 mi: Incomplete access
