= Williams Bridge station =

Metro-North Railroad station in the Bronx, New York

Williams Bridge
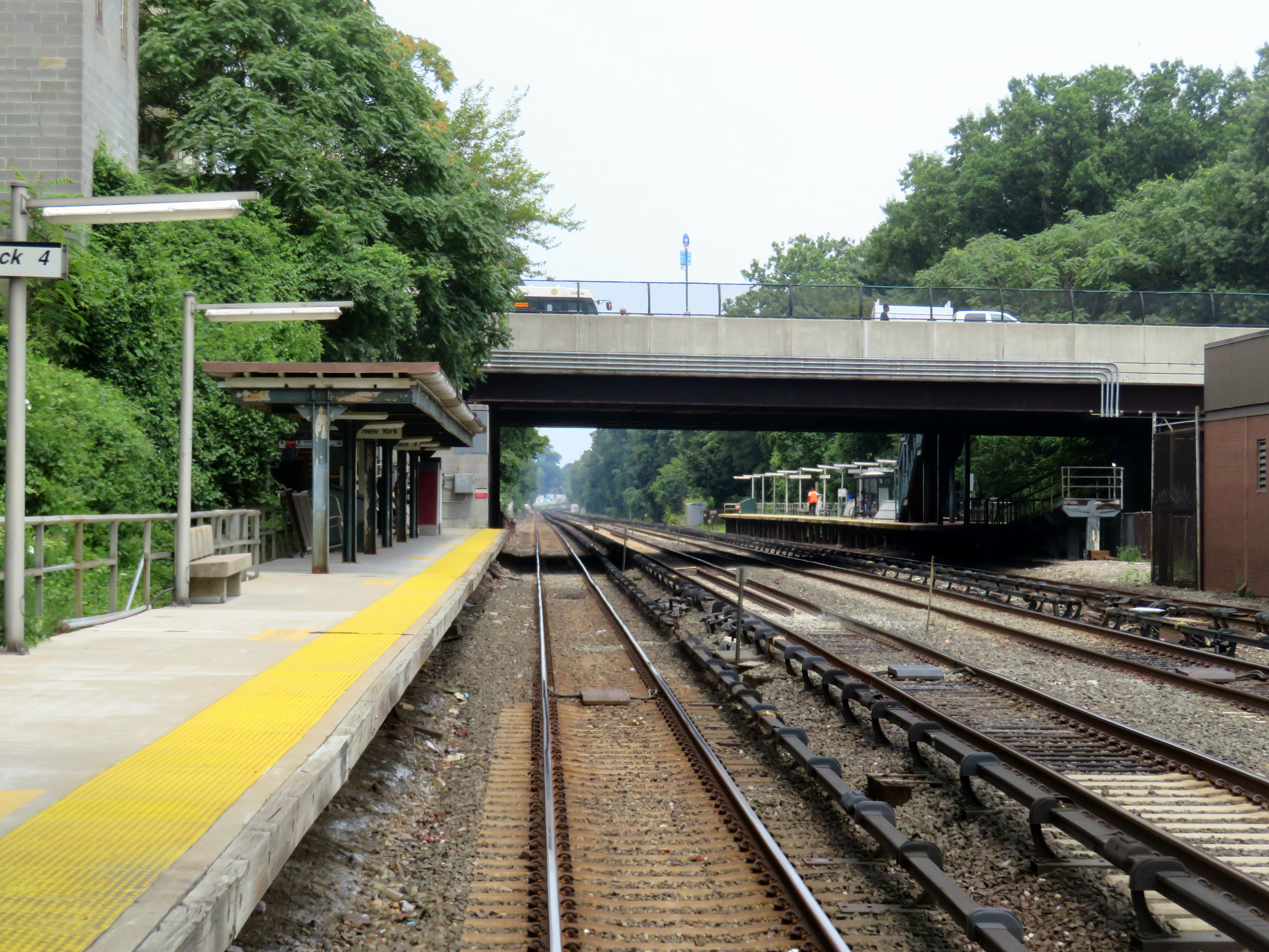
- Williams Bridge station in July 2019

General information
- Location: 402 Gun Hill Road; Norwood, Bronx, New York
- Coordinates: 40.8788°N 73.8707°W
- Owner: Metro-North Railroad
- Line: Harlem Line
- Platforms: 2 side platforms
- Tracks: 4
- Connections: New York City Subway: at Gun Hill Road; New York City Bus: Bx28, Bx38, Bx41, Bx41 SBS

Other information
- Fare zone: 2

History
- Opened: September 3, 1842
- Electrified: 700V (DC) third rail

Passengers
- 2018: 867 (Metro-North)
- Rank: 58 of 109

Services
Preceding station	Metro-North Railroad	Following station
Botanical Garden toward Grand Central	Harlem Line	Woodlawn toward North White Plains
New Haven Line does not stop here
Former services
Preceding station	New York Central Railroad	Following station
Botanical Garden toward New York	Harlem Division	Woodlawn toward Chatham
Location

Williams Bridge station (also known as Williams Bridge–East 210th Street station) is a commuter rail stop on the Metro-North Railroad's Harlem Line, serving the Williamsbridge and Norwood sections of the Bronx, New York City. The station is located at the intersection of Gun Hill Road and Webster Avenue. The station has two offset high-level side platforms, each four cars long, serving the outer tracks of the four-track line.

== History ==
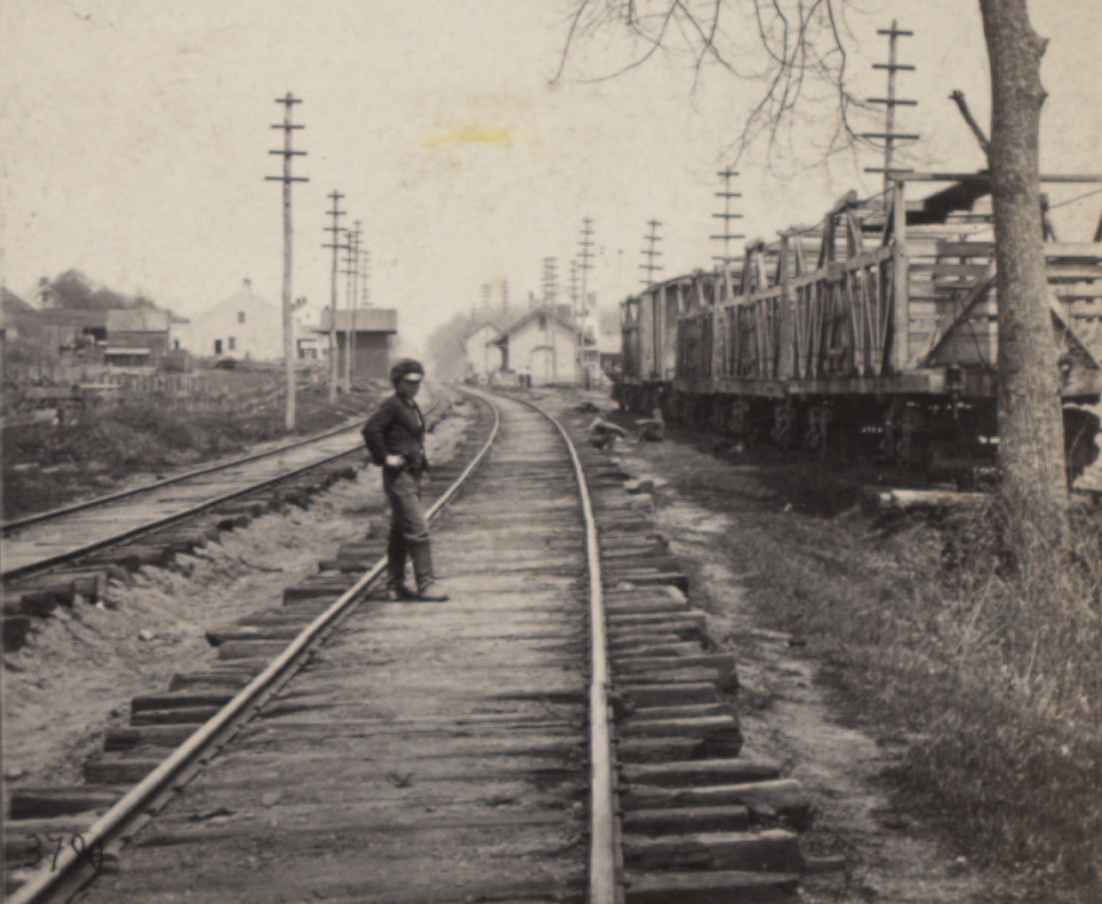
Williams Bridge station, ca. 1849

The New York and Harlem Railroad opened in 1842. It became part of the New York Central and Hudson River Railroad in 1864, and later the New York Central Railroad (NYC). The Williams Bridge station building was located at the southeast corner of the Gun Hill Road bridge. The Third Avenue Elevated passed over the station from 1920 to 1973.

The NYC merged into Penn Central in 1968, which in turn merged into Conrail in 1976. The Metropolitan Transportation Authority (MTA) added high-level platforms during the mid-1970's and took over the service in 1983 as the Metro-North Railroad Harlem Line. A parking lot was located on the south side of the Gun Hill Road bridge on the east side of the tracks until the 1990s. The southbound on-ramp to the Bronx River Parkway had two way traffic between Gun Hill Road and the parking lot; it was called Newell Street between those two points.

In January 2020, the MTA announced plans for renovations of Williams Bridge, Woodlawn, and Botanical Garden stations, including elevators and new stairs at Williams Bridge. The northbound platform was temporarily closed on January 8, 2021, due to deterioration of the stairway. Temporary stairs were built for both platforms that year and were replaced during a closure of the station from June 20 to July 12, 2023. The MTA opened bidding on a design-build contract for the three stations in December 2023. In June 2025, the MTA began adding elevators to the Williams Bridge station as part of a project that also replaced elevators at the Botanical Garden station and added elevators to the Woodlawn station.
