= Bronx River Road =

Road in Yonkers, New York, USA

Coordinates: 40°54′53″N 73°51′01″W

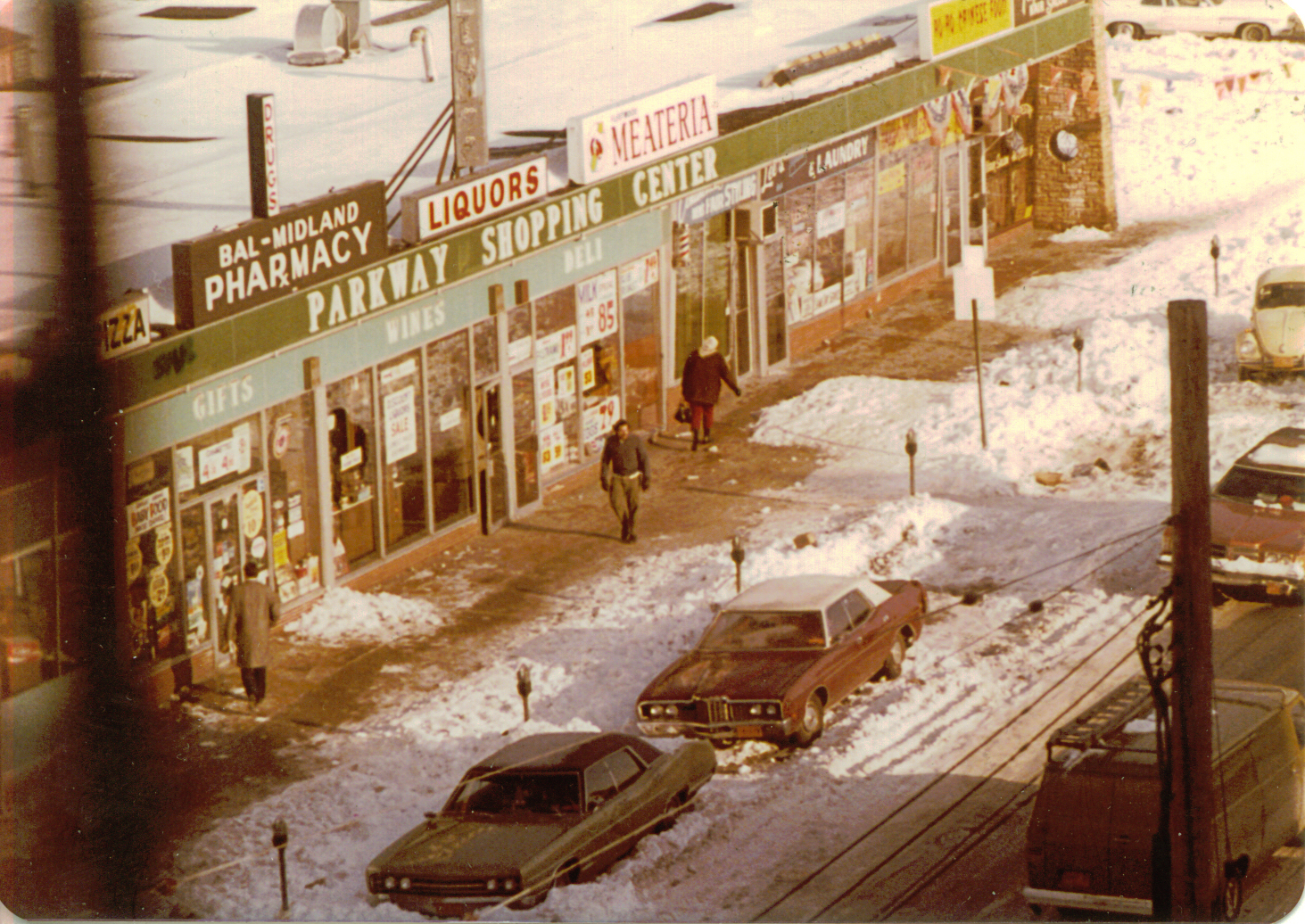
Bronx River Road, circa 1980

Bronx River Road is a major street and neighborhood in Yonkers, New York. It runs alongside the Bronx River, Bronx River Parkway, and Metro-North railroad tracks in south-eastern Yonkers. On the other side of the Bronx River is the City of Mount Vernon, New York as well as the Bronx. Bronx River Road runs down to McLean Avenue at the city line with New York City where it becomes Webster Avenue in the Woodlawn section of the Bronx. To the north, when it reaches the Cross County Parkway, Bronx River Road merges into Midland Avenue which leads to the Village of Bronxville, New York.

Bronx River Road is lined with many older, large apartment houses along with several residential blocks with small corner stores. The area could be described as middle class. Though the area is sometimes referred to as Sherwood Park, or Fleetwood, most area residents refer to their neighborhood simply as "Bronx River Road".

On March 16, 2003, there was a major fire at the Wakefield Towers apartment building at 85 Bronx River Road. Though there were no serious injuries, the building suffered massive damage, leaving over 300 people homeless. Since then, Wakefield Towers has been gutted, renovated, and rehabilitated, with all its architectural detail (turrets, minarets, etc.) having been restored by February 2007.

This neighborhood is one of the most populated in eastern Yonkers.
