= Soundview Park =

Public park in the Bronx, New York

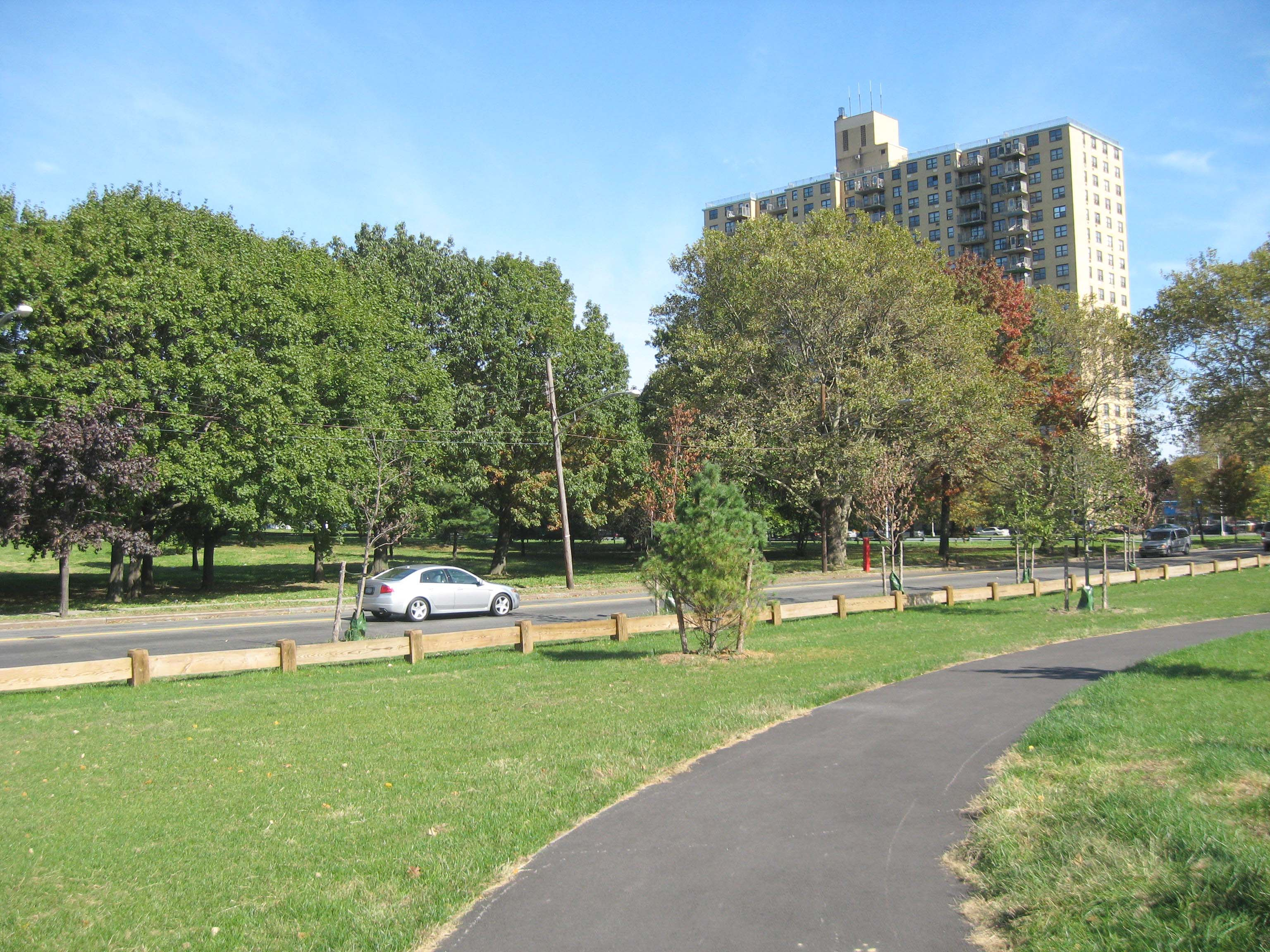
- Story Avenue in the northeast end of Soundview Park
- Interactive map of Soundview Park
- Type: Municipal park
- Location: Clason Point, The Bronx, New York
- Coordinates: 40°48′43″N 73°52′1″W
- Area: 205 acres (83 ha)
- Opened: 1937
- Owner: New York City Department of Parks and Recreation
- Status: open all year
- Water: Bronx River
- Facilities: kayaking, playground
- Website: www.nycgovparks.org/parks/soundviewpark/

Soundview Park (sometimes referred to as Sound View Park) is a 205-acre (83 ha) park on Clason Point in the southern portion of the Bronx, New York City. The park is adjacent to the Clason Point, Hunts Point, and Soundview neighborhoods, situated where the Bronx River flows into the East River, roughly opposite Rikers Island and LaGuardia Airport. The park is bounded by the Bronx River Estuary/East River, Lafayette Avenue, Morrison Avenue, Story Avenue, Metcalf Avenue, O'Brien Avenue, and Bronx River Avenue.

Soundview Park is equipped with playgrounds, running tracks, sports fields, basketball and handball courts, outdoor fitness equipment, and kayak/canoe launching sites along the Bronx River Estuary. A bicycle path runs through the park from Bronx River and Lafayette Avenues to Leland and O'Brien Avenues. Soundview Park is operated by the New York City Department of Parks and Recreation.

== History ==
Soundview Park was built on landfill over intertidal marshland under Parks Commissioner Robert Moses during the administration of New York Mayor Fiorello LaGuardia. The first 93 acres (38 ha) of the park were acquired by the City of New York in 1937. 66 acres (27 ha) more were acquired along the water's edge in December 1939. Plans to dredge and fill the shoreline had been developed by Moses and Sanitation Commissioner William F. Carey in 1938, and the New York City Board of Estimate approved initial funding for the construction project at Sound View Park in March 1939.

In the summer of 1942, a strange gas that caused silver to tarnish and gave people headaches and nausea was noticed in the Clason Point neighborhood. Experts and residents initially suspected that the garbage in the landfill under the parkland had not been handled properly, but finally the cause was determined to be dumping of sulphur from a Consolidated Edison plant into nearby stagnant pools.

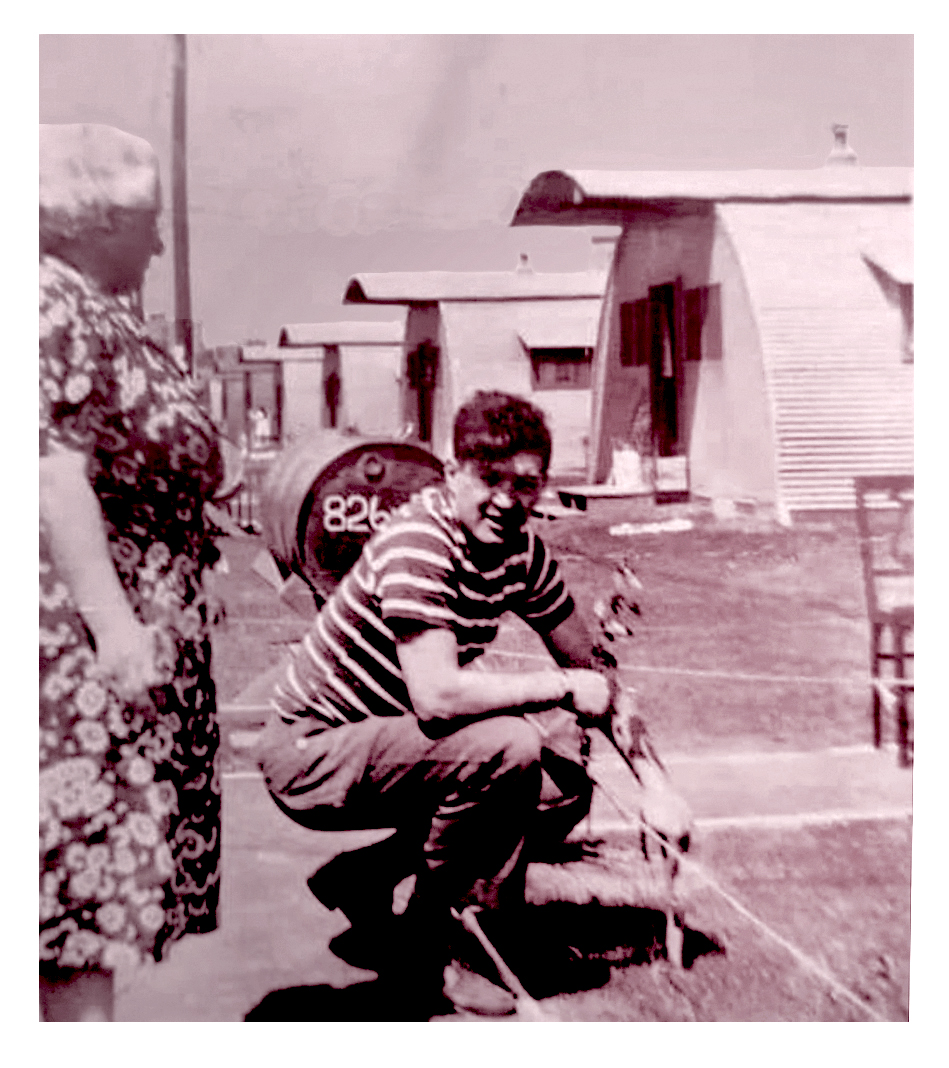
Bronx Quonset Huts

The area remained largely undeveloped until the 1950s, and adjacent land was used in 1947 for a New York City Housing Authority temporary housing project made up of 947 apartments in 473 quonset huts. One remaining Quonset Hut is still visible on the south side of Seward Avenue at Croes Avenue. Further, more permanent public and private housing projects were built adjacent to the park in the 1950s.

Extensions of the park were made by purchase of adjacent land in 1952 and 1967, when the park reached its current size.

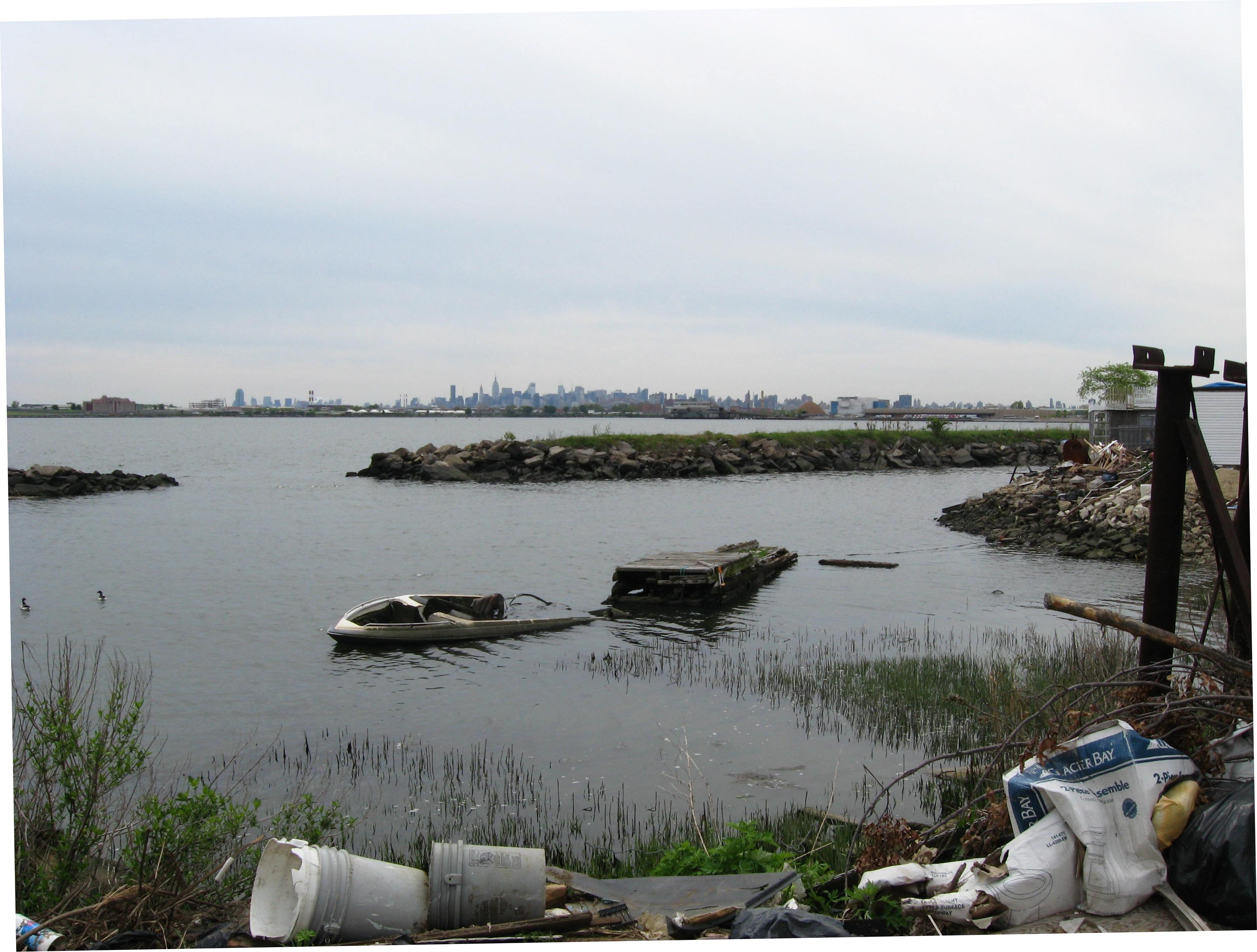
Neglected lagoon at the south end of the park

As part of Mayor Michael Bloomberg's PlaNYC city planning initiative, the park is slated to be redesigned by landscape architects Thomas Balsley Associates (TBA). The landscape architects describe their planned intervention at Soundview Park:

TBA envisions transformation through the design of Neighborhood Gateway park spaces at the edges of the residential communities, developing passive recreation opportunities throughout the park, enhancing existing active recreation opportunities, opening the waterfront to the park’s visitors and creating a naturalized zone in the contaminated landfill areas through environmental remediation.

New York Road Runners hosts a weekly 2.60-mile Open Run.
