= Williamsbridge, Bronx =

Neighborhood in New York City

Williamsbridge
- Neighborhood of the Bronx
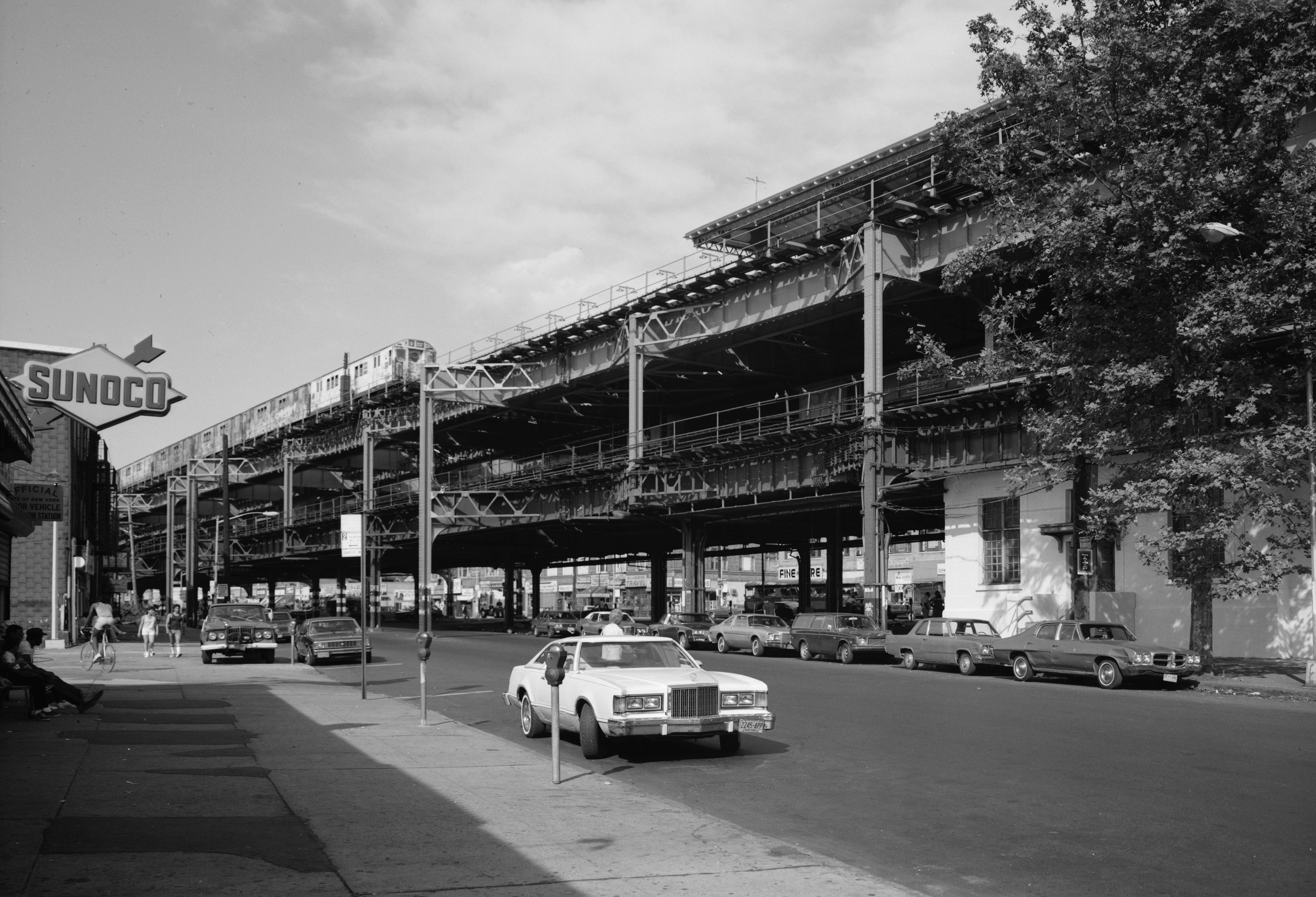
- Williambridge Square, 1984
- Location in New York City
- Coordinates: 40.877°N 73.866°W
- Country: United States
- State: New York
- City: New York City
- Borough: The Bronx
- Community District: Bronx 12

Area
  - Total: 1.202 sq mi (3.11 km^{2})

Population (2010 United States census)
  - Total: 61,321
  - Density: 51,020/sq mi (19,700/km^{2})

Economics

Ethnicity
  - African-American: 67.5%
  - Hispanic and Latino American: 25.6%
  - White: 2.8%
  - Asian: 1.6%
  - Others: 2.5%
- ZIP Codes: 10466, 10467, 10469
- Area code: 718, 347, 929, and 917
- Website: www.williamsbridge.nyc

Williamsbridge is a neighborhood geographically located in the north-central portion of the Bronx in New York City. Its boundaries, starting from the north and moving clockwise are East 222nd Street to the north, Boston Road to the east, Adee Avenue to the south, and the Bronx River to the west. White Plains Road is the primary thoroughfare through Williamsbridge.

The neighborhood is part of Bronx Community Board 12 and its ZIP Codes include 10466, 10467, and 10469. The area is patrolled by the 47th Precinct of the New York City Police Department. New York City Housing Authority (NYCHA) property in the area is patrolled by P.S.A. 8 at 2794 Randall Avenue in the Throggs Neck section of the Bronx.

== History ==
Class of the Socialist Sunday School organized by Italian immigrants of Williamsbridge in the summer of 1911.

According to the New York City Parks Department, Williamsbridge was named for 18th Century farmer John Williams, who had a farm on the east bank of the Bronx River in the vicinity of Gun Hill Road and White Plains Road, and was credited with building the first bridge over the Bronx River. It incorporated as a village on November 23, 1888.

Olinville, named for Methodist Episcopal minister Stephen Olin, is a disused neighborhood name for the area around Olinville Avenue in Williamsbridge. However, the name "Olinville" survives in four telephone exchanges — OLinville 2, 3, 4, and 5 — which can still be found in the neighborhood (as 652, 653, 654 and 655).

=== Planned zoning changes ===
The New York City Department of City Planning has proposed zoning map changes for 36 blocks in the Williamsbridge/Olinville area. The proposed zoning would preserve the area's lower density residential character and promote new development in keeping with the scale of the surrounding neighborhood. In addition, the DCP is proposing a zoning text amendment establishing a new citywide R5A district to address the unique detached housing stock found within this neighborhood.

The area's development patterns, although varied, are characterized by distinct enclaves of detached, semi-detached, and attached residential buildings, as well as a smaller number of mid and high-rise apartment buildings. However, the height and density of existing housing is generally lower than is permitted under the current zoning. Clusters of one- and two-family homes are prevalent in many parts of Williamsbridge and few buildings are higher than 70 feet, even in the more densely developed portions of the neighborhood. The proposed rezonings aim to address this zoning mismatch by ensuring that new development is of a density and scale compatible with the low-rise/low-density character of this community.

== Demographics ==
The neighborhood was historically heavily Jewish and Italian-American. It became predominantly African American in the 1970s, and since the 1980s, has received an influx of Caribbean and West Indian immigrants.

Based on data from the 2010 United States census, the population of Williamsbridge was 61,321, an increase of 3,901 (6.8%) from the 57,420 counted in 2000. Covering an area of 833.25 acres (337.20 ha), the neighborhood had a population density of 73.6 inhabitants per acre (47,100/sq mi; 18,200/km^{2}). The racial makeup of the neighborhood was 2.8% (1,690) White, 67.5% (41,380) African American, 0.4% (237) Native American, 1.6% (961) Asian, 0.0% (13) Pacific Islander, 0.6% (396) from other races, and 1.6% (956) from two or more races. Hispanic or Latino of any race were 25.6% (15,688) of the population.

The entirety of Community District 12, which comprises Williamsbridge, Woodlawn, Baychester, and Eastchester, had 156,542 inhabitants as of NYC Health's 2018 Community Health Profile, with an average life expectancy of 81.0 years. This is about the same as the median life expectancy of 81.2 for all New York City neighborhoods. Most inhabitants are youth and middle-aged adults: 24% are between the ages of between 0–17, 27% between 25 and 44, and 26% between 45 and 64. The ratio of college-aged and elderly residents was lower, at 10% and 13% respectively.

As of 2017, the median household income in Community District 12 was $48,018. In 2018, an estimated 22% of Williamsbridge and Eastchester residents lived in poverty, compared to 25% in all of the Bronx and 20% in all of New York City. One in eight residents (13%) were unemployed, compared to 13% in the Bronx and 9% in New York City. Rent burden, or the percentage of residents who have difficulty paying their rent, is 57% in Williamsbridge and Eastchester, compared to the boroughwide and citywide rates of 58% and 51% respectively. Based on this calculation, as of 2018, Williamsbridge and Eastchester are considered high-income relative to the rest of the city and not gentrifying.

== Land use and terrain ==
Williamsbridge is characterized by multi-family homes and moderate size multi-unit buildings. Majority of residences are private and owner-occupied two and three stories homes. The total land area is roughly a mile and a half. The area is low-lying and flat.

=== Parks ===
The Seventh Draft District World War I Monument located at East 219th Street and Bronx Blvd. and the park that surrounds it, has undergone a renaissance as of late. In addition to the Department of Parks cleaning up the area in 2008, there has been an annual Memorial Day service at the monument itself since 2009.

== Police and crime ==
Williamsbridge and Eastchester are patrolled by the 47th Precinct of the NYPD, located at 4111 Laconia Avenue. The 47th Precinct ranked 35th safest out of 69 patrol areas for per-capita crime in 2010. As of 2018, with a non-fatal assault rate of 82 per 100,000 people, Williamsbridge and Eastchester's rate of violent crimes per capita is more than that of the city as a whole. The incarceration rate of 577 per 100,000 people is higher than that of the city as a whole.

The 47th Precinct has a lower crime rate than in the 1990s, with crimes across all categories having decreased by 60.9% between 1990 and 2022. The precinct reported 16 murders, 45 rapes, 461 robberies, 732 felony assaults, 300 burglaries, 758 grand larcenies, and 461 grand larcenies auto in 2022.

== Fire safety ==
Williamsbridge is served by two New York City Fire Department (FDNY) fire stations. Engine Co. 62/Ladder Co. 32 is located at 3431 White Plains Road, while Engine Co. 63/Ladder Co. 39/Battalion 15 is located at 755 East 233rd Street.

== Health ==
As of 2018, preterm births and births to teenage mothers are more common in Williamsbridge and Eastchester than in other places citywide. In Williamsbridge and Eastchester, there were 102 preterm births per 1,000 live births (compared to 87 per 1,000 citywide), and 24 births to teenage mothers per 1,000 live births (compared to 19.3 per 1,000 citywide). Williamsbridge and Eastchester has a low population of residents who are uninsured. In 2018, this population of uninsured residents was estimated to be 8%, lower than the citywide rate of 12%.

The concentration of fine particulate matter, the deadliest type of air pollutant, in Williamsbridge and Eastchester is 0.0075 milligrams per cubic metre (7.5×10^{−9} oz/ft^{3}), the same as the city average. Eleven percent of Williamsbridge and Eastchester residents are smokers, which is lower than the city average of 14% of residents being smokers. In Williamsbridge and Eastchester, 30% of residents are obese, 14% are diabetic, and 39% have high blood pressure—compared to the citywide averages of 24%, 11%, and 28% respectively. In addition, 24% of children are obese, compared to the citywide average of 20%.

Eighty-eight percent of residents eat some fruits and vegetables every day, which is about the same as the city's average of 87%. In 2018, 78% of residents described their health as "good", "very good", or "excellent", equal to the city's average of 78%. For every supermarket in Williamsbridge and Eastchester, there are 8 bodegas.

The nearest large hospitals are Calvary Hospital, Montefiore Medical Center's Jack D. Weiler Hospital, and NYC Health + Hospitals/Jacobi in Morris Park. The Albert Einstein College of Medicine campus is also located in Morris Park. In addition, Montefiore Medical Center's Wakefield Campus is located in Williamsbridge. In addition, Beth Abraham Center is located on Allerton and Barker Avenues.

== Post offices and ZIP Codes ==
Williamsbridge is located within multiple ZIP Codes. The part north of 222nd Street is located in 10466. The area south of 222nd Street is divided into two ZIP Codes: 10467 west of Bronxwood Avenue and 10469 east of Bronxwood Avenue. The United States Postal Service operates two post offices nearby: the Wakefield Station at 4165 White Plains Road and the Williamsbridge Station at 711 East Gun Hill Road.

== Education ==
Williamsbridge and Eastchester generally have a lower rate of college-educated residents than the rest of the city as of 2018. While 32% of residents age 25 and older have a college education or higher, 20% have less than a high school education and 48% are high school graduates or have some college education. By contrast, 26% of Bronx residents and 43% of city residents have a college education or higher. The percentage of Williamsbridge and Eastchester students excelling in math rose from 32% in 2000 to 48% in 2011, though reading achievement remained constant at 37% during the same time period.

Williamsbridge and Eastchester's rate of elementary school student absenteeism is slightly higher than the rest of New York City. In Williamsbridge and Eastchester, 29% of elementary school students missed twenty or more days per school year, more than the citywide average of 20%. Additionally, 70% of high school students in Williamsbridge and Eastchester graduate on time, about the same as the citywide average of 75%.

=== School ===
PS 96 Richard Rodgers School is located at Olinville Avenue and Waring Avenue.

=== Library ===
The New York Public Library (NYPL)'s Wakefield branch is located at 4100 Lowerre Place. The branch opened in 1938 and contains collections in its basement and first floor.

== Transportation ==
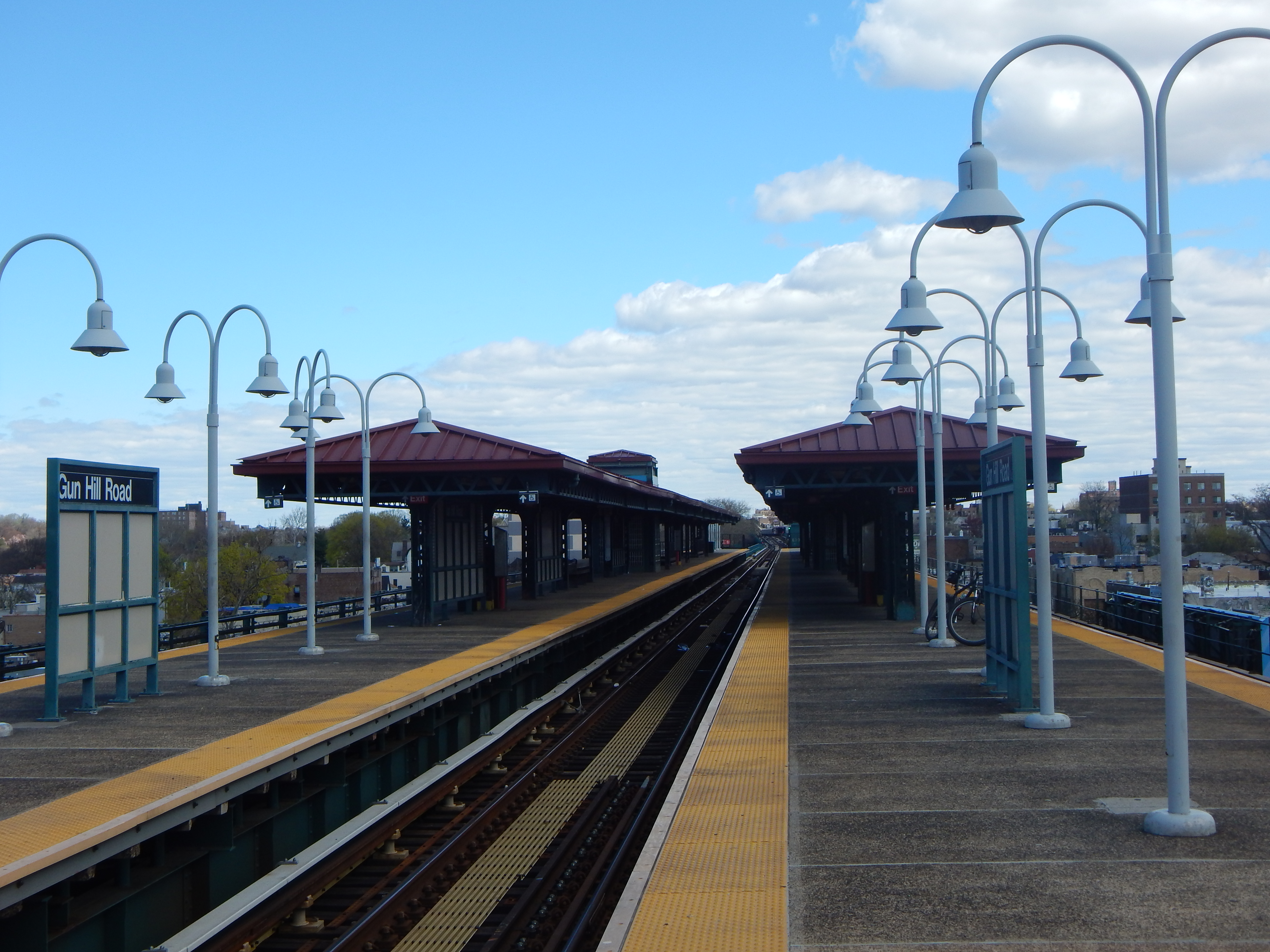
Gun Hill Road station

The following MTA Regional Bus Operations bus routes serve Williamsbridge:

- Bx8: to Locust Point (via Williamsbridge Road)
- Bx28: to Co-op City or Fordham Center (via Gun Hill Road)
- Bx30: to Co-op City or Pelham Parkway (via Boston Road)
- Bx38: to Co-op City or Norwood–205th Street (via Gun Hill Road)
- Bx39: to Wakefield or Clason Point (via White Plains Road)
- Bx41 SBS: to The Hub (via Webster Avenue)
- BxM11: express bus to Midtown Manhattan

The following New York City Subway stations serve Williamsbridge:

- Gun Hill Road (2 and 5 trains)
- 219th Street (2 and 5 trains)
- Burke Avenue (2 and 5 trains)

The Metro-North Railroad also stops at Williams Bridge station at Gun Hill Road and Webster Avenue, served by the Harlem Line.
