= Mosholu Parkway =

Road in the Bronx, New York

Mosholu Parkway
- Mosholu Parkway highlighted in red

Route information
- Maintained by NYCDOT
- Length: 3.03 mi (4.88 km)
- Restrictions: No commercial vehicles on freeway section

Major junctions
- South end: Bronx River Parkway / Bronx Park East / Allerton Avenue in Bronx Park
- I-87 in Van Cortlandt Park
- North end: Henry Hudson Parkway / Saw Mill River Parkway in Van Cortlandt Park

Location
- Country: United States
- State: New York
- Counties: Bronx

Highway system
- New York Highways; Interstate; US; State; Reference; Parkways

Mosholu Parkway is a 3.03-mile-long (4.88 km) parkway in the borough of the Bronx in New York City. The roadway extends between the New York Botanical Garden (where its southeast end meets the Bronx River Parkway) and Van Cortlandt Park (where its northwest end meets the Henry Hudson Parkway). The New York City Department of Transportation is responsible for the operation and maintenance of the roadway while the New York City Department of Parks and Recreation is responsible for the surrounding rights-of-way. The parkway is designated as New York State Route 908F (NY 908F), an unsigned reference route, by the New York State Department of Transportation.

== Route description ==
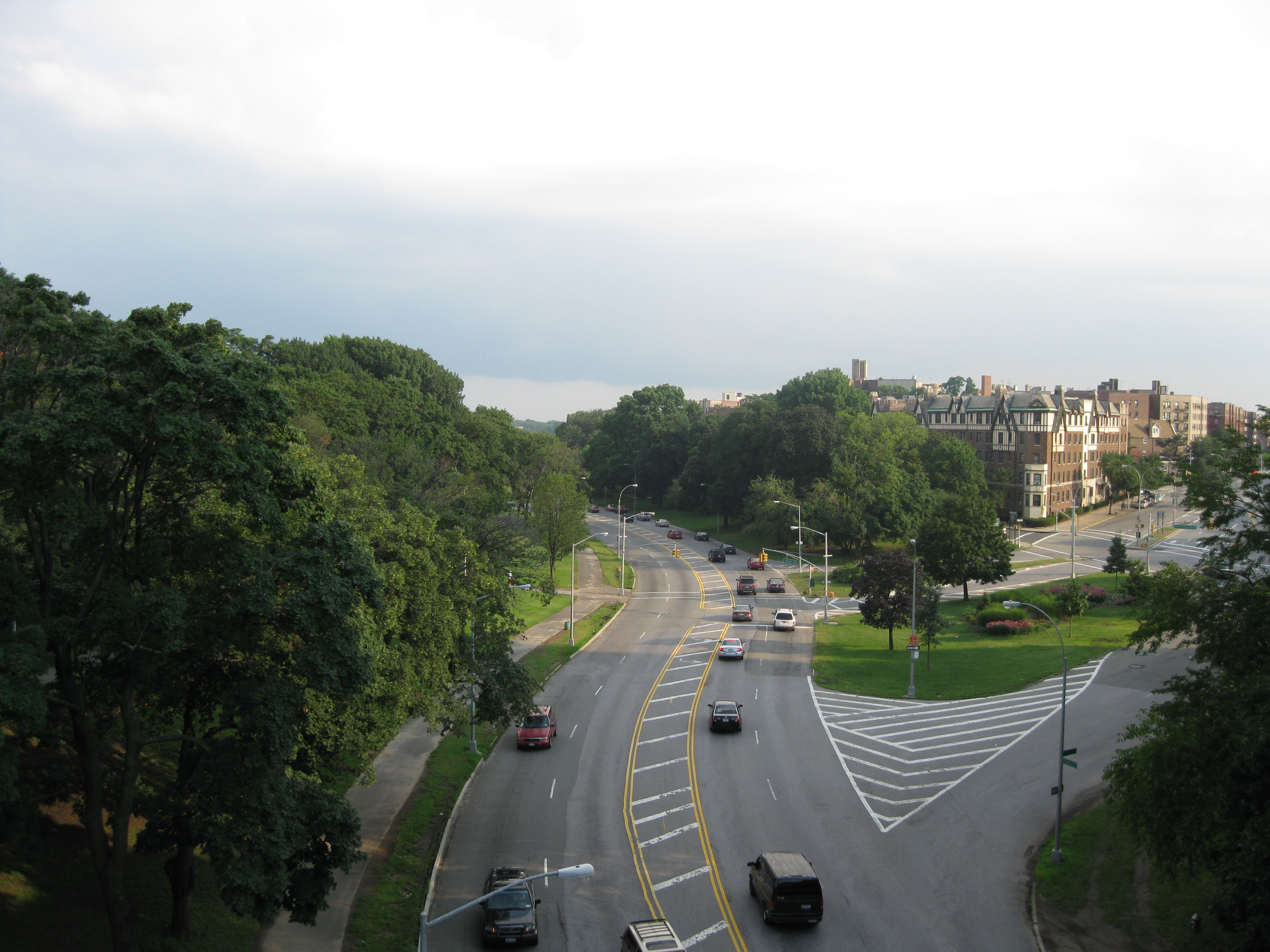
Mosholu Parkway, seen from the Mosholu Parkway station on the IRT Jerome Avenue Line.

Mosholu Parkway begins at exit 8W of the Bronx River Parkway. It heads northward as a boulevard through the northern parts of the Bronx. The highway crosses through Bedford Park, passing Bainbridge Avenue. It intersects with the Grand Concourse afterwards, with Jerome Avenue, Sedgwick Avenue and West Gun Hill Road soon after. Within Van Cortlandt Park, the parkway becomes a freeway, with exits for the southbound Major Deegan Expressway (Interstate 87) and the Henry Hudson Parkway near its northern terminus at the Westchester County line (where it turns into the Saw Mill River Parkway).

A bikeway, part of the East Coast Greenway, runs along the northeast side of the parkway from Bronx Park to Van Cortlandt Park, connecting through the park to other trails and playing fields and to Broadway.

== History ==
=== Etymology ===
There are conflicting accounts as to what "Mosholu" is derived from. According to one account, "Mosholu" is an Algonquin word meaning "smooth stones" or "small stones", and was first applied to the nearby creek now known as Tibbetts Brook. The southern end of the parkway was once home to another creek called Schuil Brook, running under what is now Middlebrook Road, which supplied water to a British fort located on old Van Cortlandt Avenue East during the American Revolutionary War.

According to another etymology, Mosholu is a contraction of the name of the Choctaw chief Mushulatubbee. The Choctaw were not local to New York, but Mushulatubbee was well known for his assistance to the US during the War of 1812. A variant form of the contracted name was given to two ships; the USS Mashula (launched as USS Severn in 1867) and the SS Moshulu. The latter ship was apparently named with the understanding that it was a Seneca word meaning fearless.

=== Context ===
In the 1870s, landscape architect Frederick Law Olmsted envisioned a greenbelt across the Bronx, consisting of parks and parkways that would align with existing geography. However, in 1877, the city declined to act upon his plan. Around the same time, New York Herald editor John Mullaly pushed for the creation of parks in New York City, particularly lauding the Van Cortlandt and Pell families' properties in the western and eastern Bronx respectively. He formed the New York Park Association in November 1881. There were objections to the system, which would apparently be too far from Manhattan, in addition to precluding development on the parks' sites. However, newspapers and prominent lobbyists, who supported such a park system, were able to petition the bill into the New York State Senate, and later, the New York State Assembly (the legislature's lower house).

In June 1884, Governor Grover Cleveland signed the New Parks Act into law, authorizing the creation of the park system. The system consisted of three parkways and six parks, with Bronx Park at the center of the system. Bronx Park was connected to Van Cortlandt Park in the northwest via Mosholu Parkway; to Pelham Bay Park in the east via Pelham Parkway; and to Crotona Park in the south via Crotona Parkway. There were no direct connections to Claremont Park and St. Mary's Park, the other two parks in the system.

The road was reconstructed between 1935 and 1937, including widening the entire parkway, making the section from the Saw Mill to Gun Hill Road, replacing the intersection at Jerome Avenue with an overpass, and installing a wide median between Marion Avenue and the Grand Concourse.

== Transportation ==
The following bus routes serve Mosholu Parkway:

- The Bx28 runs between Paul and Bainbridge Avenues when running the full route. Service to Fordham Center is absent north of Van Cortlandt Avenue East. The Bay Plaza-bound Bx38 provides additional service after 9:35pm on Sundays.
- The Pelham-bound Bx16 and Riverdale-bound Bx10 serve from East 206th Street to Van Cortlandt Avenue.
  - The Bx10 also runs between Sedgwick and Paul Avenues in both directions.
- The Bx25 and Bx26 run on the section of Mosholu that interferes with Southern Boulevard.
- Additional service between Grand Concourse and Sedgwick Avenue is provided by the Bx1 and Bx2.

The IRT Jerome Avenue Line has the Mosholu Parkway station at Mosholu Parkway and Jerome Avenue.

== Major intersections ==
The entire route is in the New York City borough of the Bronx.

Location	mi	km	Destinations	Notes
Bronx Park	0.00	0.00	Bronx Park East / Allerton Avenue	Northern terminus of Southern Boulevard
Bronx Park	0.03– 0.40	0.048– 0.64	Bronx River Parkway – White Plains, Soundview Park, Bronx Zoo	Cloverleaf interchange; exits 8E-W on Bronx River Parkway
Bronx Park	0.53	0.85	Southern Boulevard – Fordham Road, Botanical Garden	NY 908F transitions between Southern Boulevard and Mosholu Parkway; located near Botanical Garden station
Norwood	0.75	1.21	Marion Avenue	
Norwood	0.85	1.37	Bainbridge Avenue	
Norwood	1.20	1.93	Van Cortlandt Avenue	
Bedford Park	1.38	2.22	Grand Concourse	No northbound exit; former NY 100 south; located near Bedford Park Boulevard station
Bedford Park	1.50	2.41	Jerome Avenue – Lehman College	Access via service roads; former NY 100 north; located near Mosholu Parkway station
Bedford Park	1.70	2.74	Sedgwick Avenue to I-87 (Major Deegan Expressway)	
Bedford Park	1.80	2.90	Gun Hill Road	All trucks must exit
Bedford Park	1.80	2.90	Southern end of freeway section	
Bedford Park	1.80	2.90	Goulden Avenue	Southbound exit only; access via Dickinson Avenue
Van Cortlandt Park	2.30	3.70	I-87 south (Major Deegan Expressway) – RFK Bridge	Southbound exit and northbound entrance; exit 12 on I-87
Van Cortlandt Park	3.50	5.63	Henry Hudson Parkway south to NY 9A (US 9) – Manhattan Saw Mill River Parkway north – Yonkers	Northern terminus of Mosholu Parkway; exit 24 on Henry Hudson Parkway
1.000 mi = 1.609 km; 1.000 km = 0.621 mi: Incomplete access; Route transition

== See also ==
- Bedford Park, the neighborhood on the southern side of Mosholu Parkway
- Norwood, the neighborhood on the northern side of Mosholu Parkway
- Bronx Park, the neighborhood and park at the eastern end of Mosholu Parkway
