= Pelham Parkway =

Road in the Bronx, New York

Pelham Parkway
- Bronx and Pelham Parkway
- Pelham Parkway highlighted in red

Route information
- Maintained by NYCDOT
- Length: 2.25 mi (3.62 km)
- Restrictions: No commercial vehicles from US 1 to Stillwell Avenue (excluding service roads)

Major junctions
- West end: US 1 / Bronx River Parkway in Bronx Park
- Hutchinson River Parkway in Pelham Bay
- East end: I-95 / Shore Road in Pelham Bay Park

Location
- Country: United States
- State: New York
- Counties: Bronx

Highway system
- New York Highways; Interstate; US; State; Reference; Parkways

The Bronx and Pelham Parkway, also known formally as the Bronx–Pelham Parkway but called Pelham Parkway in everyday use, is a 2.25-mile-long (3.62 km) parkway in the borough of the Bronx in New York City. The road begins in Bronx Park at the Bronx River Parkway and U.S. Route 1 (US 1) and ends at Interstate 95 (I-95), the New England Thruway, in Pelham Bay Park, hence the roadway's name. The parkway is designated as New York State Route 907F (NY 907F), an unsigned reference route, by the New York State Department of Transportation (NYSDOT).

Despite the parkway moniker, Pelham Parkway is partially an expressway and partially a boulevard, with two main roadways (one in each direction), and two service roads on the surface section. Like other parkways in New York City, commercial traffic is not permitted on the surface section east of US 1, however it can use the paralleling service roads. The parkway is maintained by the New York City Department of Transportation.

The residential neighborhood that surrounds the parkway is Morris Park, though the part of the neighborhood closest to the road is commonly referred to as Pelham Parkway.

A bikeway, which signed as a portion of the East Coast Greenway travels alongside the parkway for its entire length.

== Route description ==
Pelham Parkway begins at a cloverleaf interchange with the Bronx River Parkway (exits 7E-W) in the Bronx Park section of the Bronx. West of here, it continues as East Fordham Road, which also carries the US 1 designation. The first 0.18 miles (0.29 km) of the Pelham Parkway is co-signed with US 1. At an intersection with Boston Road – named for the Boston Post Road – US 1 turns north and leaves the parkway.

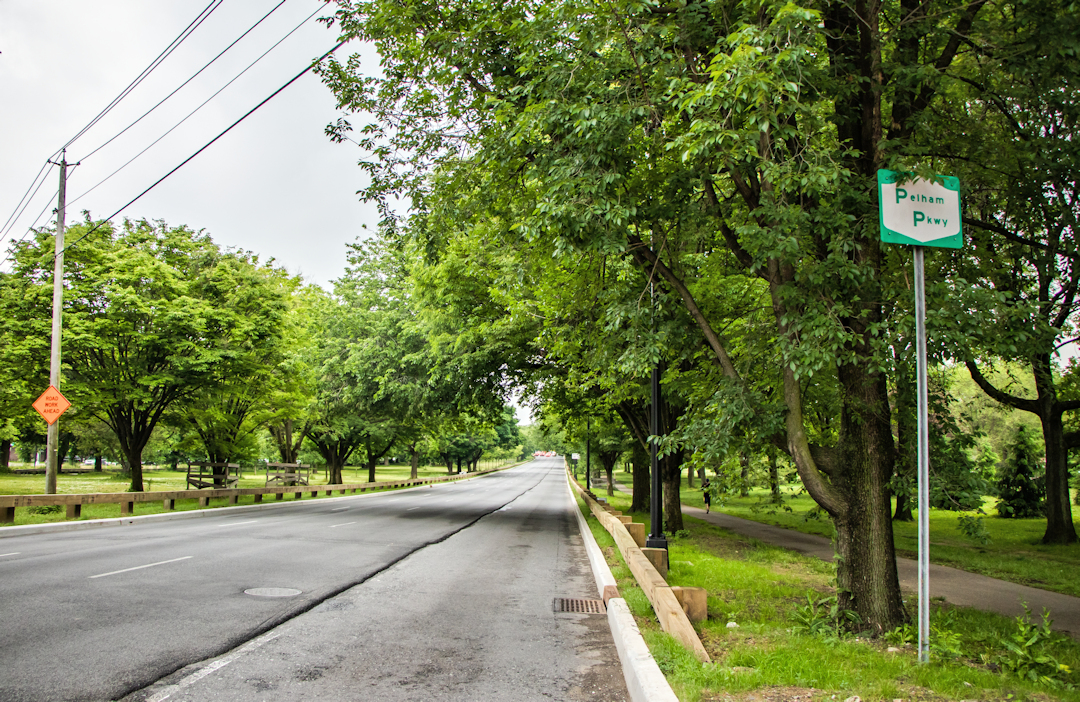
Pelham Parkway westbound

The road, a six-lane divided boulevard, crosses under the New York City Subway's IRT White Plains Road Line (the 2 and 5 trains) at the Pelham Parkway station at an intersection with White Plains Road. The parkway continues east through the Morris Park neighborhood, passing and intersecting with Williamsbridge Road, which leads to the Jacobi Medical Center. At this intersection, the parkway also crosses over the IRT Dyre Avenue Line (the 5 train) at the underground Pelham Parkway station on that line. The parkway bends eastward, crossing Eastchester Road, then Stillwell Avenue merges into the parkway, marking the eastern end of the service roads.

After Stillwell Avenue and leaving Morris Park, the parkway becomes an expressway, crossing over the Northeast Corridor tracks and entering Pelham Bay. It enters a partial cloverleaf interchange with the Hutchinson River Parkway (exit 3). Less than 0.5 miles (0.80 km) later, the parkway enters Pelham Bay Park and has another cloverleaf interchange with I-95 (the New England Thruway). This junction serves as the eastern terminus of Pelham Parkway, which continues east into the park as an expressway known as Shore Road.

The speed limit on the parkway is 25 miles per hour (40 km/h) between the Bronx River Parkway and Stillwell Avenue (the surface section), and 40 miles per hour (64 km/h) between Stillwell Avenue and I-95 (the limited-access section).

Pelham Parkway is maintained by the New York City Department of Transportation (NYCDOT), while the surrounding landscaping and bike path are managed by the New York City Parks Department. The parkway between White Plains Road and Stillwell Avenue has a wide landscaped median between the frontage roads on both sides and the westbound main road. The space between the westbound main and frontage roads on the north side is used as a park, with benches and walking paths.

The parkway also has two bike paths between Boston Road and Stillwell Avenue, one for each direction. These bike paths are part of the larger East Coast Greenway, which connects Maine and Florida.

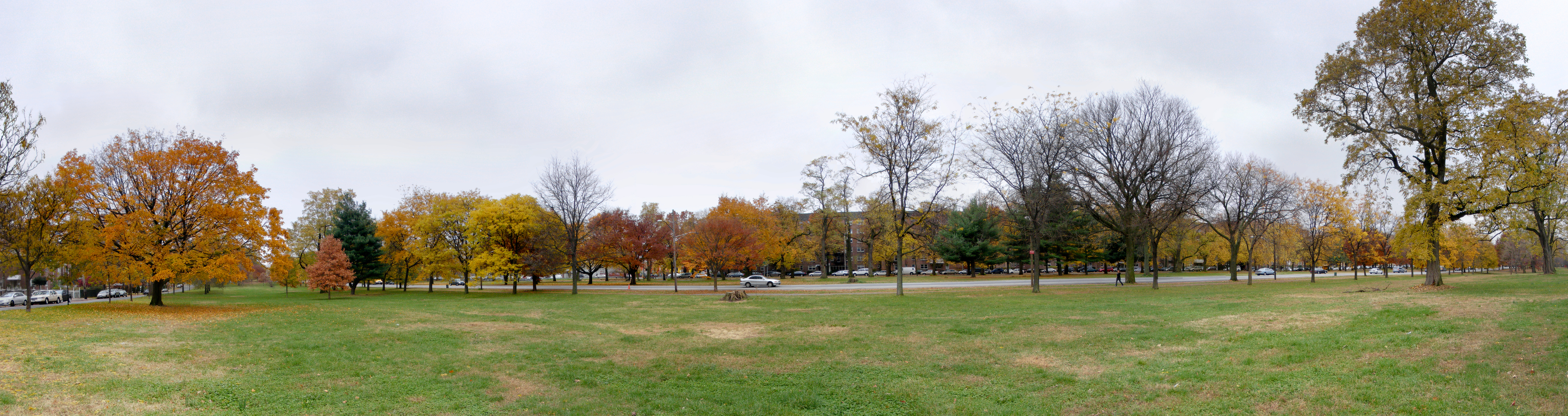
A panorama of Pelham Parkway

== History ==
=== Origins ===
In the 1870s, landscape architect Frederick Law Olmsted envisioned a greenbelt across the Bronx, consisting of parks and parkways that would align with existing geography. However, in 1877, the city declined to act upon his plan. Around the same time, New York Herald editor John Mullaly pushed for the creation of parks in New York City, particularly lauding the Van Cortlandt and Pell families' properties in the western and eastern Bronx respectively. He formed the New York Park Association in November 1881. There were objections to the system, which would apparently be too far from Manhattan, in addition to precluding development on the parks' sites. However, newspapers and prominent lobbyists, who supported such a park system, were able to petition the bill into the New York State Senate, and later, the New York State Assembly (the legislature's lower house).

In June 1884, Governor Grover Cleveland signed the New Parks Act into law, authorizing the creation of the park system. The system consisted of three parkways and six parks, with Bronx Park at the center of the system. Bronx Park was connected to Pelham Bay Park in the east via Pelham Parkway; to Van Cortlandt Park in the northwest via Mosholu Parkway; and to Crotona Park in the south via Crotona Parkway. There were no direct connections to Claremont Park and St. Mary's Park, the other two parks in the system.

=== Construction, proposed upgrades ===
The original Pelham Parkway was built in 1911 and opened in 1912 as a small, two-lane road in today's westbound lanes through what was then rural Westchester County. The road had strict building codes, as nobody could build within 150 feet of it.

When New York City boomed after World War I and the Bronx became part of the city and neighborhoods, highways, and parks built up, the Pelham Parkway became a commuter route. Construction on today's Pelham Parkway started in 1935 under parks commissioner Robert Moses and was completed in 1937.

In the 1950s and 1960s, Moses wanted to upgrade the parkway to a freeway and extend it to the Henry Hudson Parkway in the Inwood neighborhood of Manhattan. It would also connect to proposed limited-access upgrade and extension of the Mosholu Parkway and a large interchange with I-95 and a never built portion of I-895 at the current interchange with I-95 in Pelham Bay. Due to a growing opposition to highway improvements in the city partially fueled by opposition to the construction of the Cross Bronx Expressway, only the section from Shore Road to Stillwell Avenue was upgraded to a freeway.

=== Present ===
In 2010, many trees were cut down along the Pelham Parkway so that NYSDOT could install a guardrail in response to an uptick in accidents. While there was local opposition to this, the project was carried out, and the parks department vowed to plant 200 new trees along the parkway.

== Major intersections ==
The entire route is in the New York City borough of the Bronx.

Location	mi	km	Destinations	Notes
Bronx Park	0.00	0.00	US 1 south (Fordham Road)	Continuation south; western end of US 1 concurrency
Bronx Park	0.00	0.00	Bronx River Parkway – Soundview Park, White Plains	Cloverleaf interchange; exit 7E on Bronx River Parkway
Morris Park	0.18	0.29	US 1 north (Boston Road)	Eastern end of US 1 concurrency; all trucks must exit
Morris Park	0.65	1.05	Williamsbridge Road	
Morris Park	1.35	2.17	Eastchester Road	Serves Jacobi Medical Center
Morris Park	1.50	2.41	Stillwell Avenue	All trucks must exit
Morris Park	1.50	2.41	Western end of limited-access section	
Pelham Bay	1.87	3.01	Hutchinson River Parkway – Rye, Whitestone Bridge, New England	No westbound access to Parkway north; exits 1C-D on Hutchinson River Parkway; former NY 1A
Pelham Bay Park	2.25	3.62	I-95 to Hutchinson River Parkway north – Co-op City, George Washington Bridge, Throggs Neck Bridge	Hutchinson River Parkway not signed eastbound; exit 8C on I-95
Pelham Bay Park	2.25	3.62	Shore Road – Orchard Beach, City Island	Continuation north; former NY 1B
1.000 mi = 1.609 km; 1.000 km = 0.621 mi: Concurrency terminus; Incomplete access
