= John Mullaly =

American journalist (1835–1915)

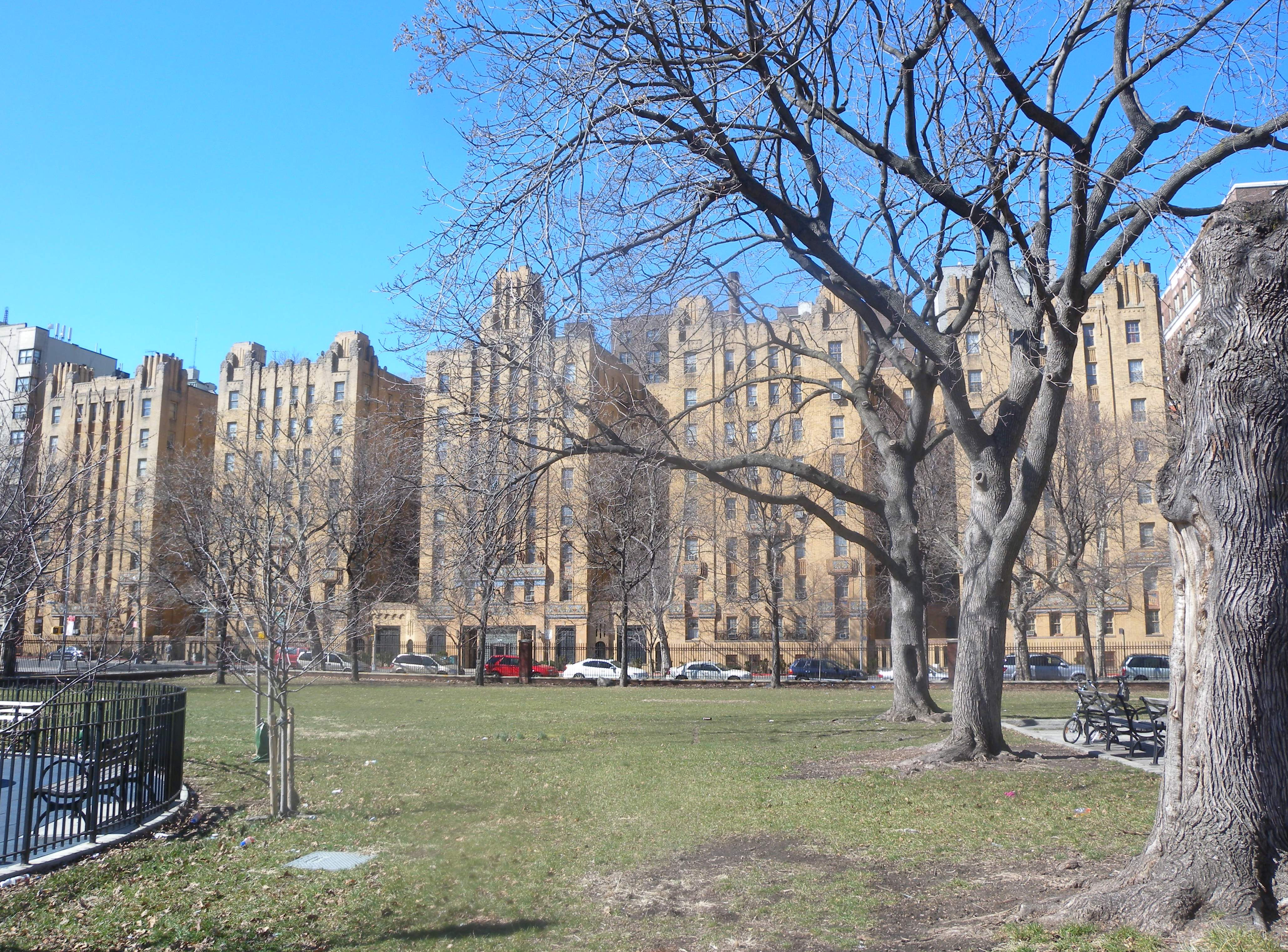
Mullaly Park, named after John Mullaly

John Mullaly (1835–1915), known as father of the Bronx's park system, was a newspaper reporter and editor who was instrumental in forming the New York Park Association. He was born in Belfast, Ireland. After coming to the United States, he worked for the New York Herald, the New York Tribune, and the New York Evening Post. He was the editor of the Metropolitan Record, published by the Catholic Church in New York City.

He held public office, including serving as the New York Commissioner of Health, and serving on the board of tax assessors.

In 1887, he published a book with the impressive title, New Parks beyond the Harlem with Thirty Illustrations and Map; Descriptions of Scenery; Nearly 4000 Acres of Free Playground for the People; Abundant space for a Parade Ground, a Rifle Range, Base Ball, Lacrosse, Polo, Tennis and all athletic games; picnic and excursion parties and nine mile of waterfront for bathing fishing, yachting and rowing.

== Early life ==
John Mullaly was born in Ireland in 1835 or 1836, probably in Belfast. Little is known of his ancestry beyond his family having come from near the town of Tuam in County Galway. Mullaly emigrated to New York by the time he was in his early teens. He had at least two sisters, one named Mary; they and their mother were known to also be living in New York by 1860, although it is not known if they all emigrated at the same time. By this time the family was wealthy enough to have hired a live-in domestic servant.

== Journalism career ==
Mullaly got a job as an office boy soon after arriving in New York, and then got a job as a reporter and taught himself shorthand. Mullaly wrote for the New York Tribune, the Evening Post, and later for the New York Herald. In 1853, Mullaly investigated and published a book-length exposé on the sale of adulterated milk in New York, the swill milk scandal, with an introduction by physician Russell Thacher Trall.

In 1954, while on staff for the Herald Mullaly was assigned to cover the construction of the first transatlantic telegraph cable.

Mullaly became editor of the Metropolitan Record in 1859, when he was 23 years old. The Record was a Catholic newspaper which had recently been started by the archbishop of New York, John Hughes. After Mullaly's appointment, however, he found that he disagreed with Hughes on important issues of the day. Hughes had initially been in favor of emancipation of southern slaves but later changed his mind and supported slavery. Hughes also supported the Union in the Civil War, while Mullaly, as a pacifist, was against the war.

== Aluminography ==
Sometime during his time at the Record, Mullaly invented a process call Aluminography, which used aluminum plates for printing. He became the president of the Aluminum Printing Plate Company.

== War resister ==
Mullaly was a controversial figure, a Copperhead (politics), during the American Civil War, one of New York City's ardent opponents to the war and the draft. On August 19, 1864, John Mullaly was arrested for inciting resistance to the draft and examined a few days later for possible trial.

At a rally in Union Square on May 19, 1863, Mullaly declared the war to be “wicked, cruel and unnecessary, and carried on solely to benefit the negroes”, and advised resistance to conscription if ever the attempt should be made to enforce the law. As editor of the Metropolitan Record, Mullaly's call for armed resistance to the military draft led to his arrest following the July 1863 New York City Draft Riots. Over one hundred people died, including Black men beaten to death or lynched by rioters, in the worst urban unrest in the United States during the 19th century. A racist, Mullaly did not support the murder of Blacks during the rioting. In one Metropolitan Record editorial he advised members of the “superior” race not to turn their anger against an “inferior” one.

Editorials in the Metropolitan Record written by Mullaly leading up to the Draft Riots accused the Lincoln Administration of perverting the war from an attempt to restore the Union into an "emancipation crusade." He charged the “vile and infamous" Emancipation Proclamation would bring "massacre and rapine and outrage into the homes on Southern plantations, sprinkling their hearths with the blood of gentle women, helpless age, and innocent childhood." According to Mullaly's diatribe, "Never was a blacker crime sought to be committed against nature, against humanity, against the holy precepts of Christianity."

In the indictment, Mullaly was also charged with counseling Governor Seymour to "forcibly to resist an enrollment ordered by competent authority in pursuance of said act of Congress." After a hearing, however, the case against Mullaly was discharged.

== Developer of parks in The Bronx ==
A biographer reports that after the Civil War Mullaly left the newspaper business and entered city government through connections with the corrupt Tweed Ring and Tammany Hall. This led to his involvement with the annexation of property in the Bronx and the eventual creation of public parks.

In 1874 when New York City annexed the west Bronx from Westchester County, Mullally sought to create public parks in the Bronx, and founded the New York Park Association in 1881. His efforts culminated in the 1884 New Parks Act and the city's 1888-90 purchase of lands for Van Cortlandt, Claremont, Crotona, Bronx, St. Mary's, and Pelham Bay Parks and the Mosholu, Pelham and Crotona Parkways.

Mullaly Park in the south Bronx was named after him. On June 16, 2021, after criticism and protests against Mullaly's racist rhetoric during the murderous New York City draft riots, the NYC Parks Department announced they would remove Mullaly's name. It will instead honor Reverend Wendell T Foster, the first Black elected in the Bronx, who as a long-standing New York City Council Member was a champion of the park and the neighborhood.

== Works by Mullaly ==
- Mullaly, John (1853). The Milk Trade in New York and Vicinity, Giving an Account of the Sale of Pure and Adulterated Milk. New York: Fowlers and Wells.
- Mullaly, John (1855). A trip to Newfoundland; its scenery and fisheries; with an account of the laying of the submarine telegraph cable. New York: T.W. Strong.
