= Pelham Parkway (disambiguation) =

Pelham Parkway may refer to:

- Pelham Parkway, in the Bronx.
- Pelham Parkway (neighborhood), Bronx
- Pelham Parkway (IRT Dyre Avenue Line), a station served by the 5 train
- Pelham Parkway (IRT White Plains Road Line), a station served by the 2 and 5 trains
