= New Parks Act =

1884 New York state law

New York State Legislature
- Territorial extent: The Bronx
- Enacted by: New York State Legislature
- Enacted: June 1884

Summary
- Creation of a system of parks in the New York City borough of the Bronx

The New Parks Act is a New York state law passed in 1884. It provided for the creation of parks in the future New York City borough of the Bronx. The West Bronx had recently been annexed and was largely undeveloped, as was the yet unannexed East Bronx. Three parkways and six parks were established as part of the New Parks Act.

Bronx Park is at the center of the system, and is now mostly occupied by the New York Botanical Garden and Bronx Zoo. The new system of Parkways in New York connected it to Van Cortlandt Park in the northwest via Mosholu Parkway; to Pelham Bay Park in the east via Pelham Parkway; and to Crotona Park in the south via Crotona Parkway. There were no direct parkway connections to Claremont Park and St. Mary's Park, the other two parks in the system.

== History ==
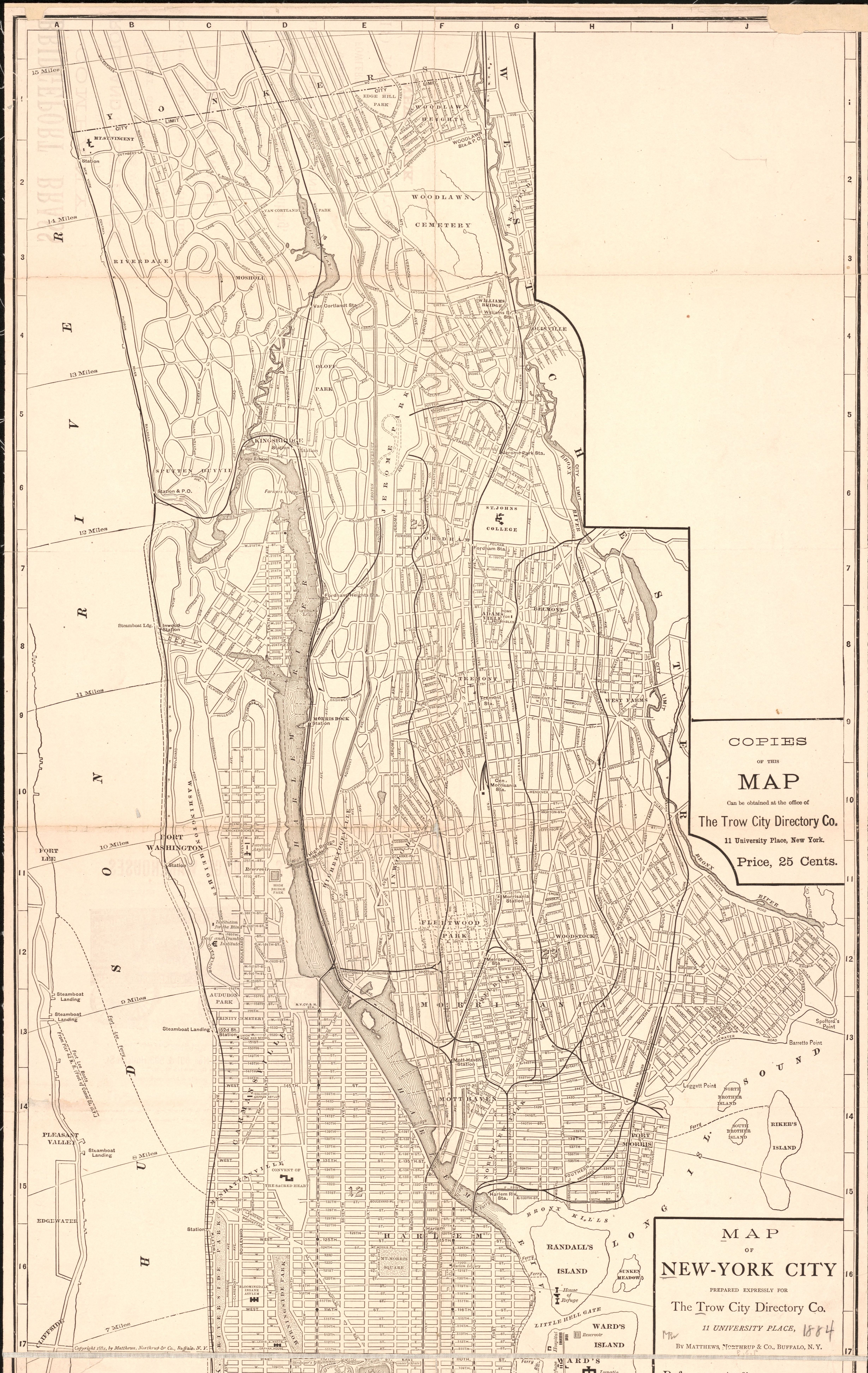
The Bronx, 1884

In 1876, Frederick Law Olmsted was hired to survey the Bronx and map out streets based on the local geography. Olmsted noted the natural beauty of the Van Cortlandt family's estate in the northwest Bronx, comparing it to Central Park which he had designed, and recommended the city purchase the property. The land was part of a proposed greenbelt across the Bronx, consisting of parks and parkways that would align more with existing geography than a grid system similar to the Commissioners' Plan of 1811 in Manhattan. That grid had given rise to Central Park, a park with mostly artificial features within the bounds of the grid. However, in 1877, the city declined to act upon his plan.

Around the same time, New York Herald editor John Mullaly pushed for the creation of parks in New York City, particularly lauding the Van Cortlandt and Pell families' properties in the western and eastern Bronx respectively. He formed the New York Park Association in November 1881. Mullaly noted that New York City had less parkland per capita than many major European cities, and that the 1853 construction of Central Park had raised property values around the park immediately after construction. His association sent out pamphlets to high-profile New Yorkers, advocating for a new park. However, controversies arose over the proposals for new parks in the Bronx, and so the city did not authorize a commission for the planned new parks. Since the city refused to make a park commission, the New York Park Association appealed to the New York State Legislature instead. On April 19, 1883, the state passed a law authorizing a seven-person commission headed by association member Luther Marsh, which would be responsible for scouting out sites for future parks in the 23rd and 24th wards of New York City (now the portion of the Bronx that is west of the Bronx River). Mullaly was named the secretary, In June 1883, the commission visited the park site, and by January 1884, Marsh had drafted a bill to the New York State Legislature regarding a proposed park system in the Bronx, comprising six parks connected by three parkways.

There were objections to the system, which would apparently be too far from Manhattan, in addition to precluding development on the site. Prominent opponents included Mayor Franklin Edson, who believed that the system of parks was too big and expensive to acquire, and Assemblyman Theodore Roosevelt, who opposed the bill's being pushed through. However, newspapers and prominent lobbyists, who supported such a park system, were able to petition the bill into the New York State Senate, and later, the New York State Assembly (the legislature's lower house). In June 1884, Governor Grover Cleveland signed the New Parks Act into law, authorizing the creation of the park system.

Legal disputes carried on for years, exacerbated by the fact that Marsh owned land near Van Cortlandt Park in particular. Opponents argued that building a park system would divert funds from more important infrastructure like schools and docks; that everyone in the city, instead of just the property owners near the proposed park, was required to pay taxes to pay for the parks' construction; and that since Marsh was trying to parcel off some of his land to developers, the park's size should be reduced in order to prevent him from profiting off park usage. However, most of this opposition was directed at the construction of Pelham Bay Park, which was then in Westchester outside New York City. Supporters argued that the parks were for the benefit of all the city's citizens, thus justifying the citywide park tax; that the value of properties near the parks would appreciate greatly over time; that the Commission had only chosen property that could easily be converted into a park; and that Pelham Bay Park would soon be annexed to the city. Ultimately, the parks were established despite the objections of major figures like Mayors William Russell Grace and Abram Hewitt; Comptroller Edward V. Loew; and Assemblymen Henry Bergh and Theodore Roosevelt.

== Sources ==
- Gonzalez, Evelyn (2004). The Bronx. Columbia University Press. ISBN 978-0-231-50835-3.
- "Van Cortlandt Park, Borough of the Bronx: Restoration Master Plan, Part 1" (PDF). New York City Parks Department, Storch Associates. 1986.
- "Van Cortlandt Park History" (PDF). the Administrator's Office Van Cortlandt & Pelham Bay Parks, City of New York Parks & Recreation. June 1986. Archived from the original (PDF) on January 4, 2016.
- "Van Cortlandt Park Master Plan 2030". New York City Parks Department. July 15, 2014.
