= Adrian Janes =

American businessman (1798–1869)

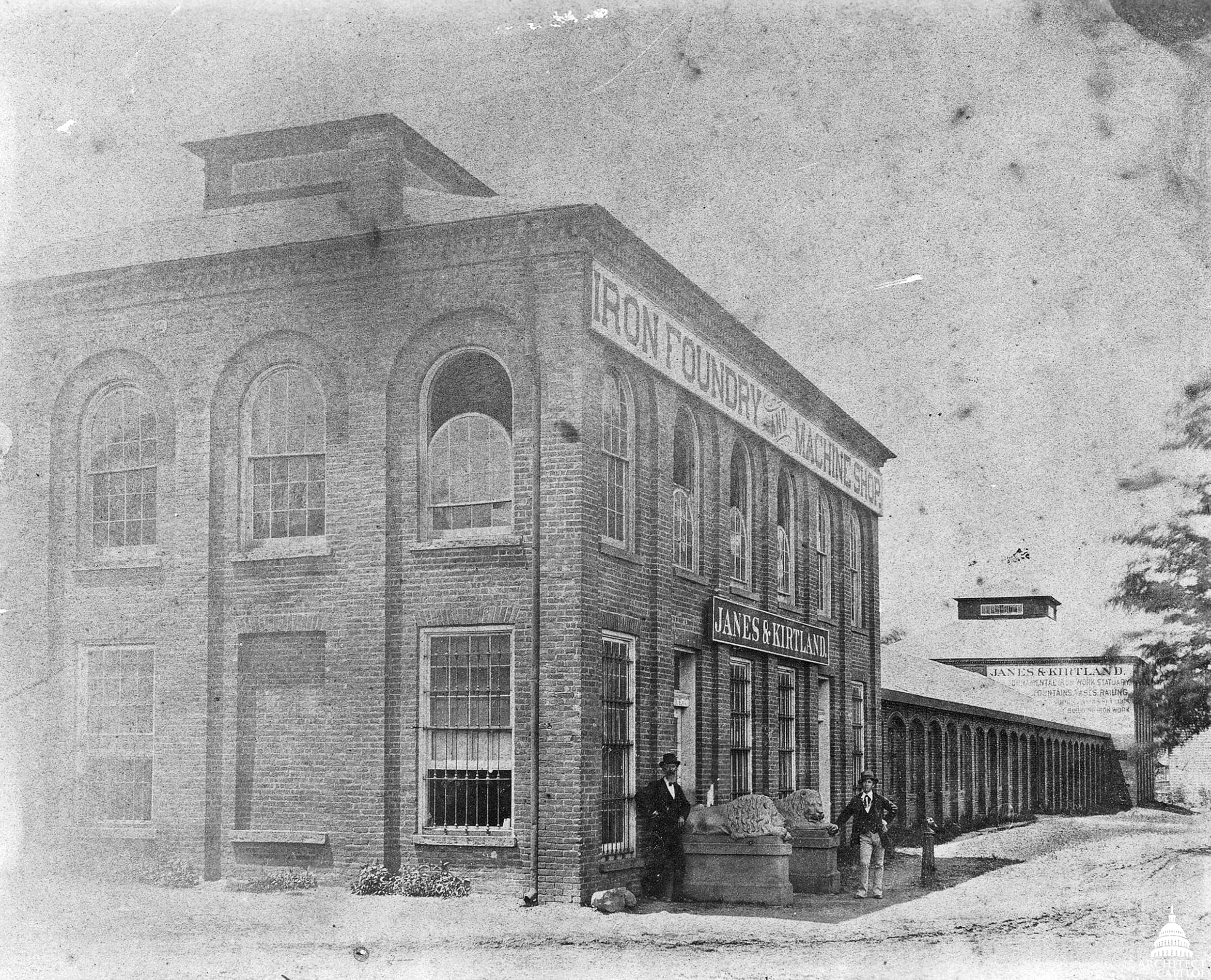

Adrian Janes (February 4, 1798 – March 2, 1869) was the owner of a significant American iron foundry in the Bronx, New York.

The foundry created iron work for many notable projects, including the Capitol Dome of the U.S. Capitol Building in Washington DC, the Bow Bridge in Central Park and railings for the Brooklyn Bridge.

Around 1855, Janes, Beebe & Co. published an Illustrated Catalogue of Ornamental Iron Work.

The company name is sometimes misattributed to James Bebe or James Beebe.

== Biography ==
Adrian Janes was the son of Mary Warren and Alfred Janes. Alfred worked in the shoe business, kept the City Hotel at Hartford, manufactured looking glasses and engaged in the house painting business. Adrian had a sister, Eliza (b. March 2, 1796), who was the mother of the landscape painter, Frederic Edwin Church. Adrian Janes married Adaline Root in 1823, and had six children: Julia E, Henry, Edward, George, Charles B, and Mary E. Adrian sold wallpaper and brushes in Hartford, Connecticut from 1821 to 1844; he was also an oil painter and presumably designed the wallpaper that he sold. “No doubt Frederic [Edwin Church] as a boy absorbed ideas about design, drawing and color from his Uncle Adrian [Janes].”

In 1844, Adrian Janes and William Beebe founded the foundry, Janes, Beebe & Co. at 356 Broadway, New York (at the corner of Reade and Center Street). In 1857, the firm moved from Manhattan to Morrisania (the Bronx). The firm was dissolved in 1859 due to the death of William Beebe. From 1859 to 1863, the firm operated as Janes, Fowler, Kirtland & Co. (Adrian Janes, Charles Fowler and Charles A. Kirtland). By 1870, the firm changed its name to Janes & Kirtland and was located at 725 6th Avenue.

In April 1857 Adrian and Adeline Janes purchased a tract of land from Gouverneur Morris II and lived in a mansion on the property. Adrian Janes named the property Mary's Park, after this daughter (it is now known as St. Mary's Park). A photo of the residence can be viewed here.

Adrian Janes died in 1869 and is buried in Woodlawn Cemetery in the Bronx. The business was continued by Charles A Kirtland until 1880; who was succeeded by Adrian Janes' son, Edward E Janes; who was succeeded by Edward E Janes' two sons, Henry and Herbert Janes. The firm operated under the name of Janes & Kirtland at 725 6th Avenue until the early 1940s.

== Wallpaper business (1821-1844) ==
Between 1821 and 1844, Adrian Janes and Edwin Bolles operated a wallpaper business, Janes & Bolles, in Hartford CT. The firm holds the distinction of assembling the earliest known book of American wallpaper samples that has survived to present day. The book resides in the collection of Old Sturbridge Village in Sturbridge, MA.

== Iron foundry (1844-c.1940) ==
=== United States Capitol dome ===
- Janes, Fowler, Kirtland & Co. was responsible for casting and erecting the cast iron dome of the U.S. Capitol Building in Washington, DC. The dome was designed by the architect Thomas Ustick Walter. Work started on the dome in 1858 and continued into the Civil War. In 1863, President Lincoln proclaimed, “If people see the Capitol going on, it is a sign we intend the Union shall go on.” The Dome was completed in 1864, weighing nearly 9 million pounds and at a cost of $1 million.
- Papers relating to the construction of the dome are archived at the Cornell University Library as Collection No. 3244 and correspondence can be found here.
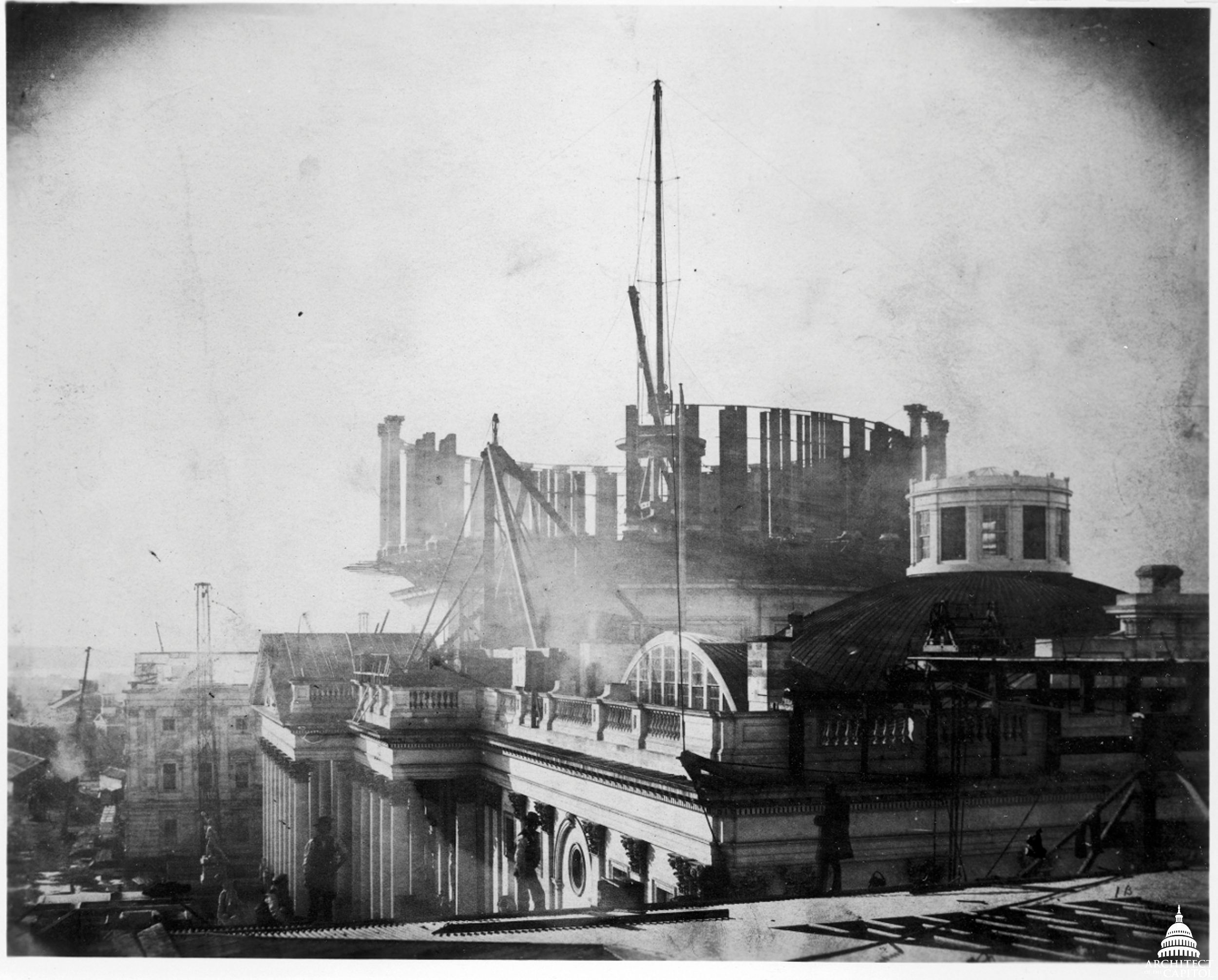

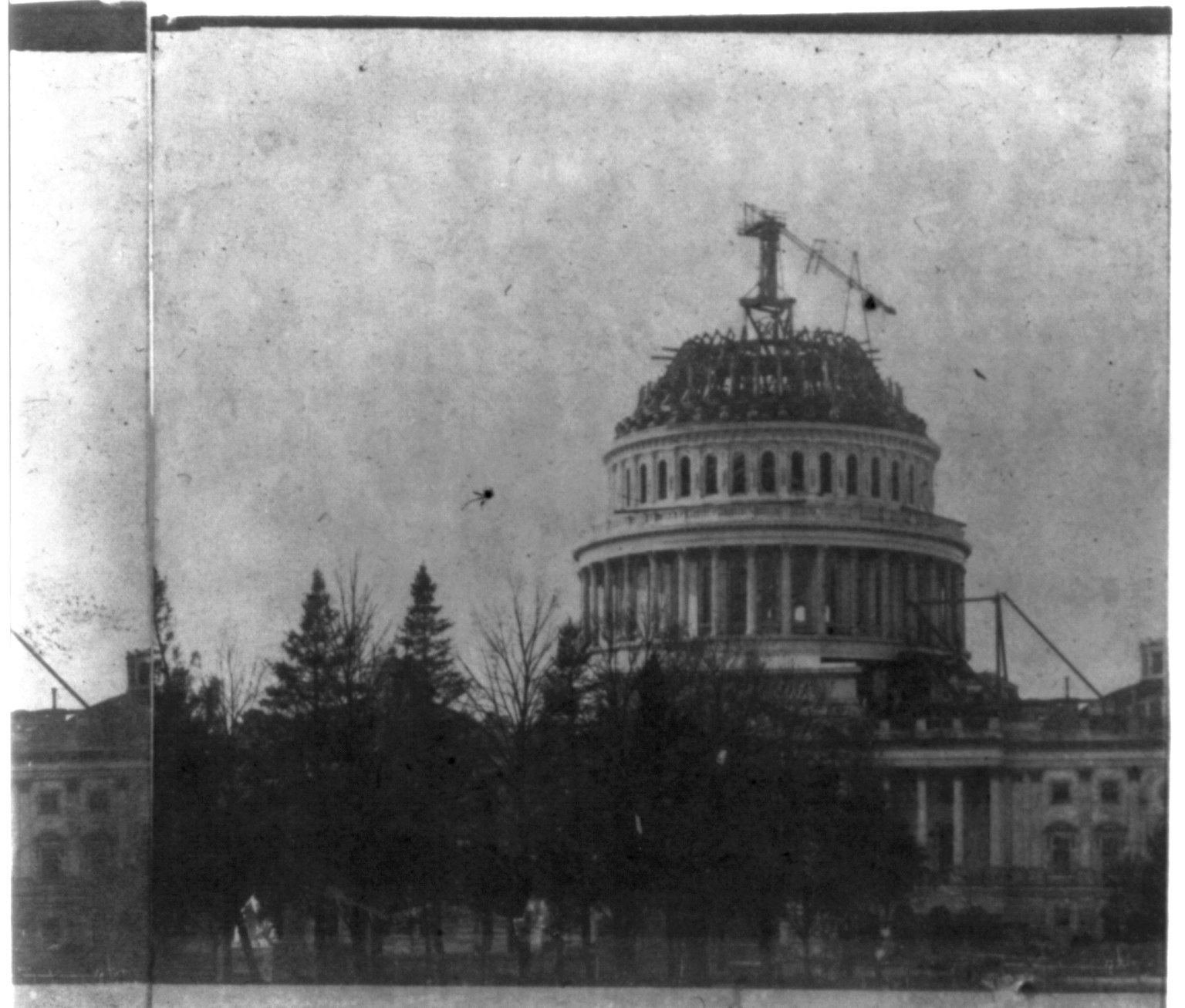

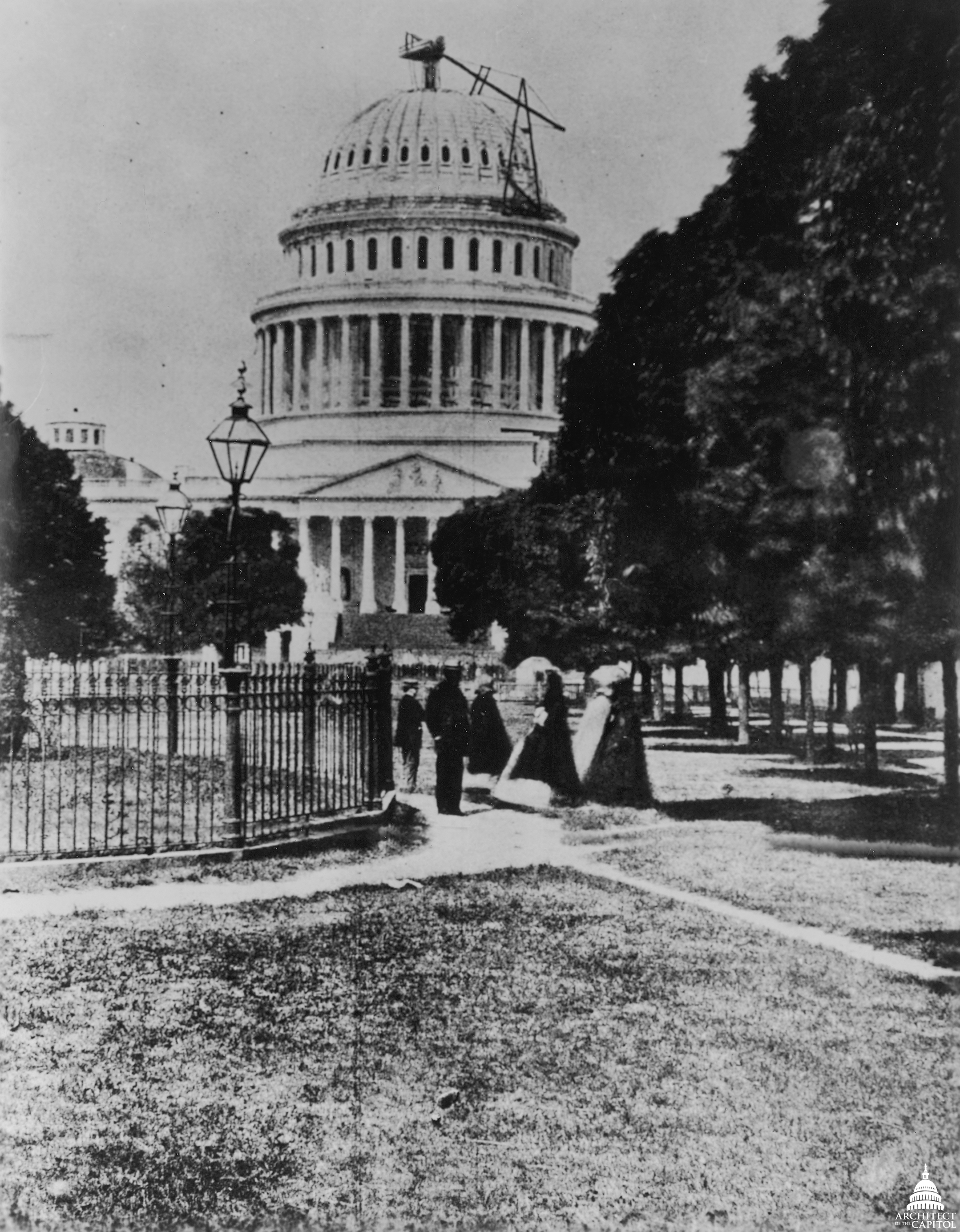

=== Government Buildings ===
- Ceiling of the Senate Chamber and House of Representatives
- East Grand Stairs of the U.S. Capitol Building
- Congressional Library in the U.S. Capitol Building* (1852)
- Patent Office, east wing furnace (1851) and west wing roof (1855)
- General Post Office
- Treasury Building
- Court House and Post Office, Portland, Maine (1871)
- Capitol building lanterns (1874)
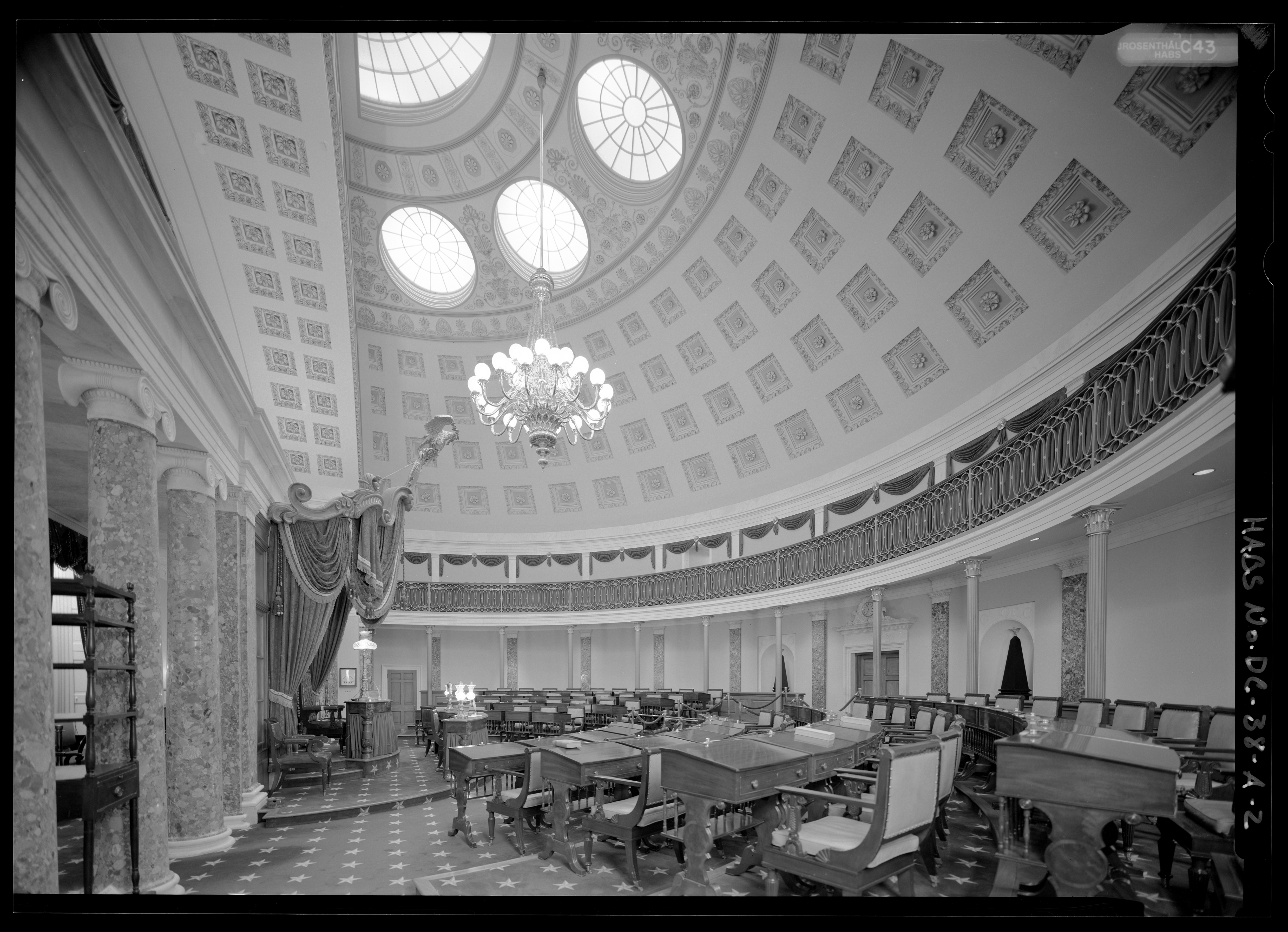
Senate Chamber

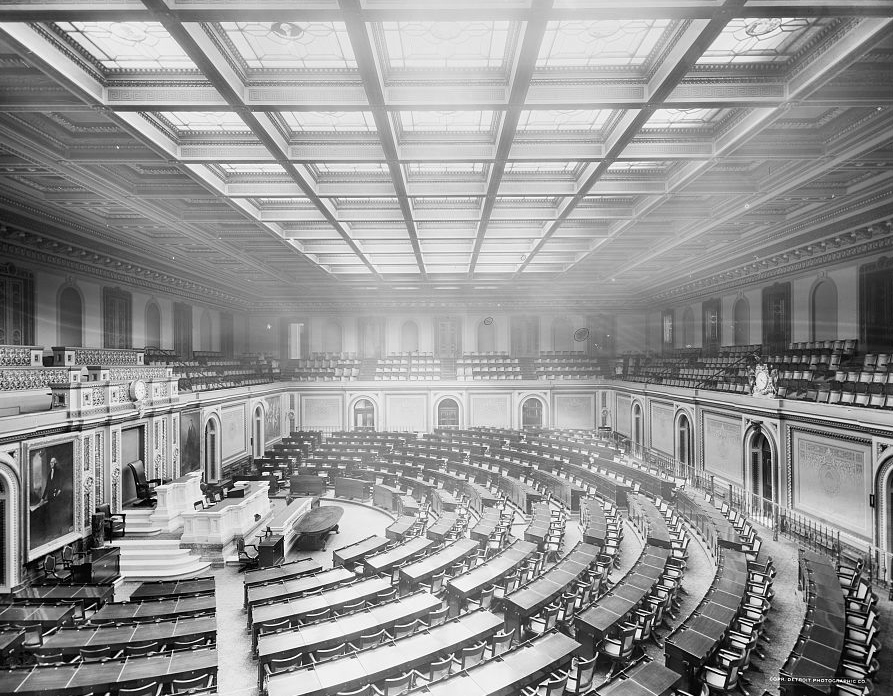
House of Representatives

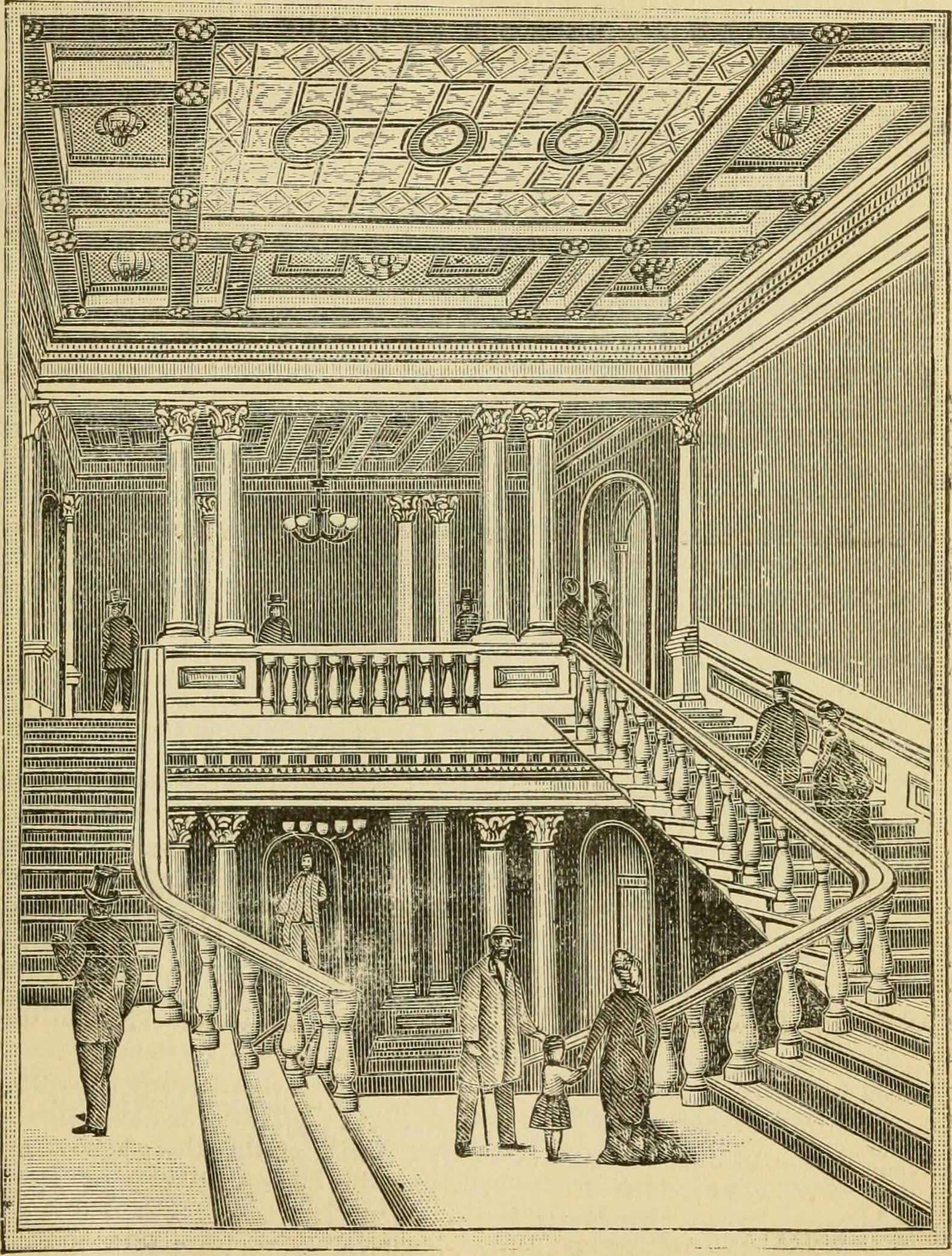
Grand stairs ceiling

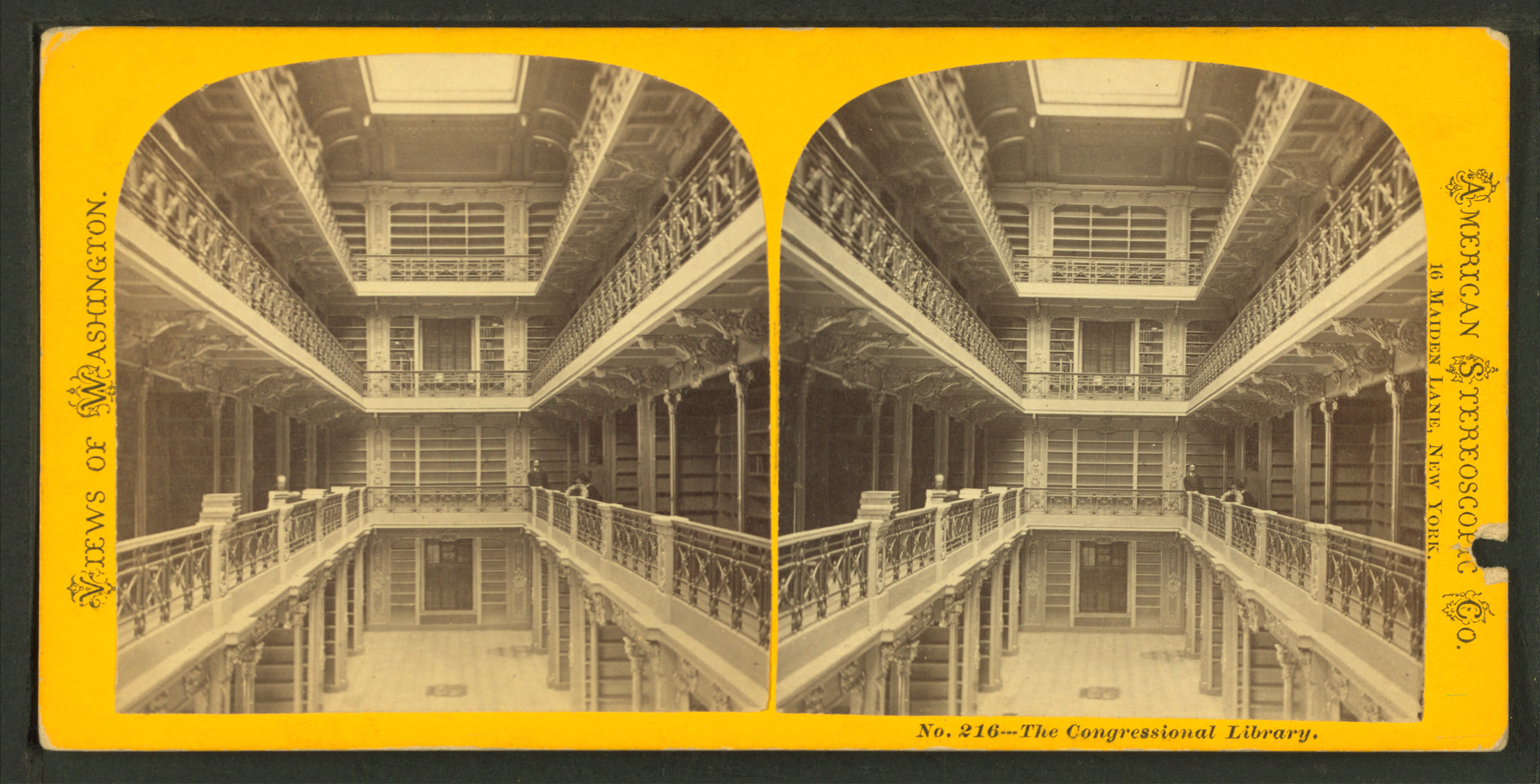
Congressional Library

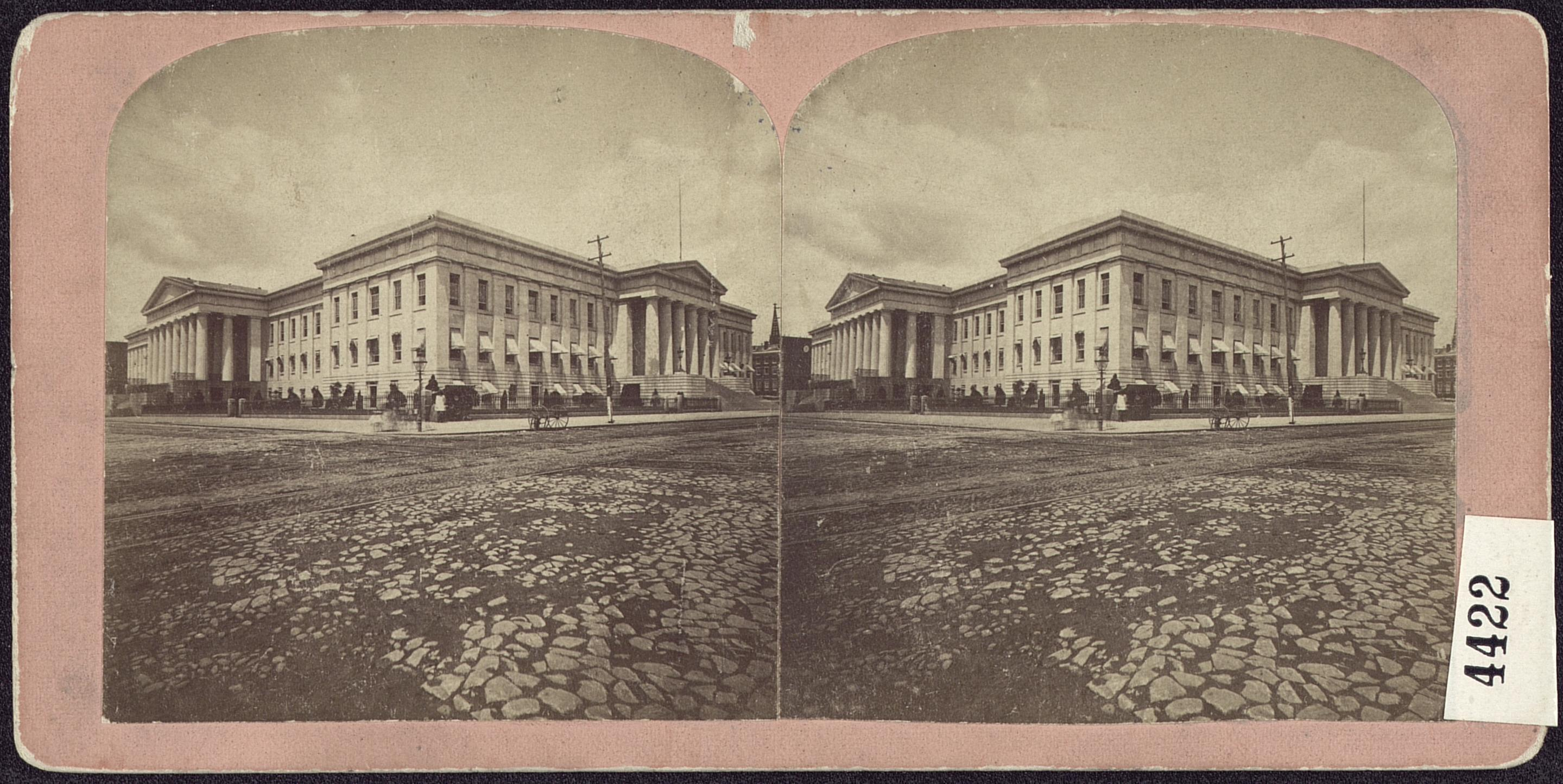
Patent Office

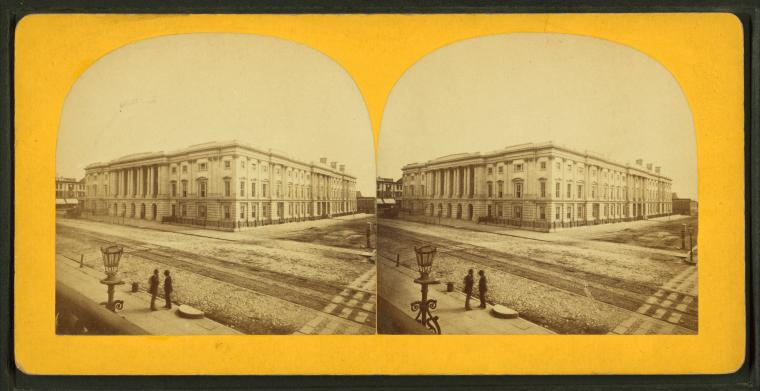
General Post Office

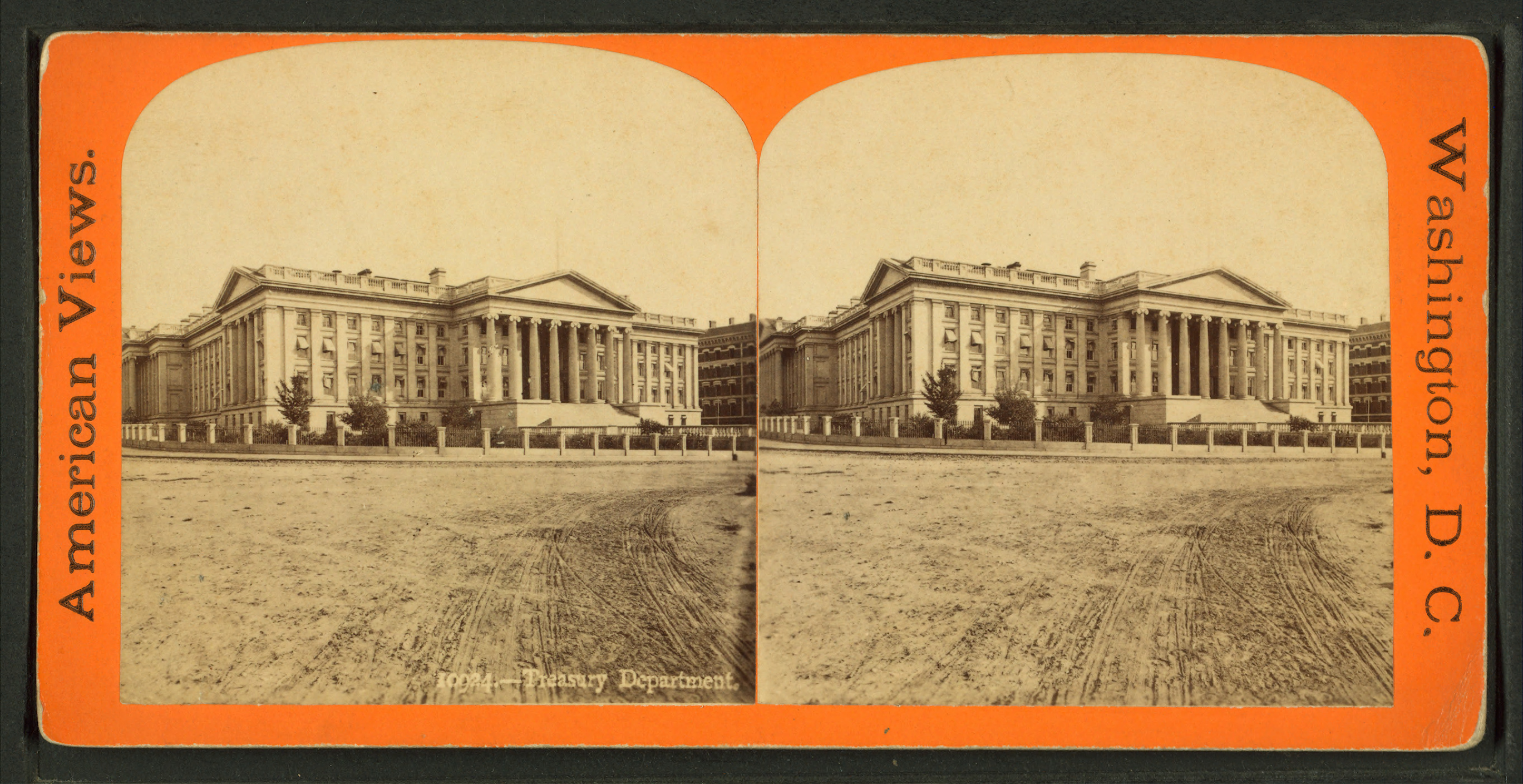
Treasury Building

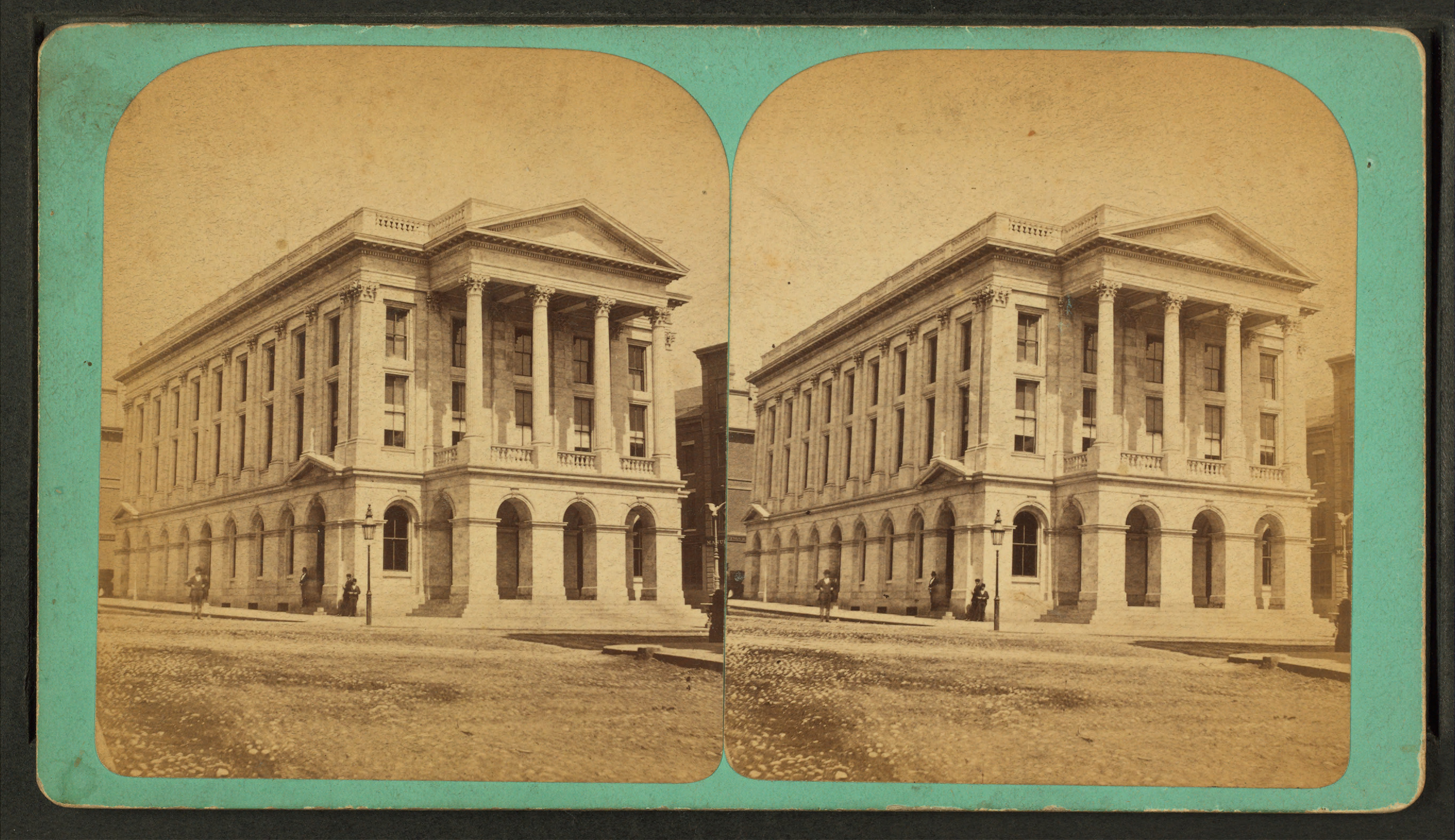
Post Office, Portland ME
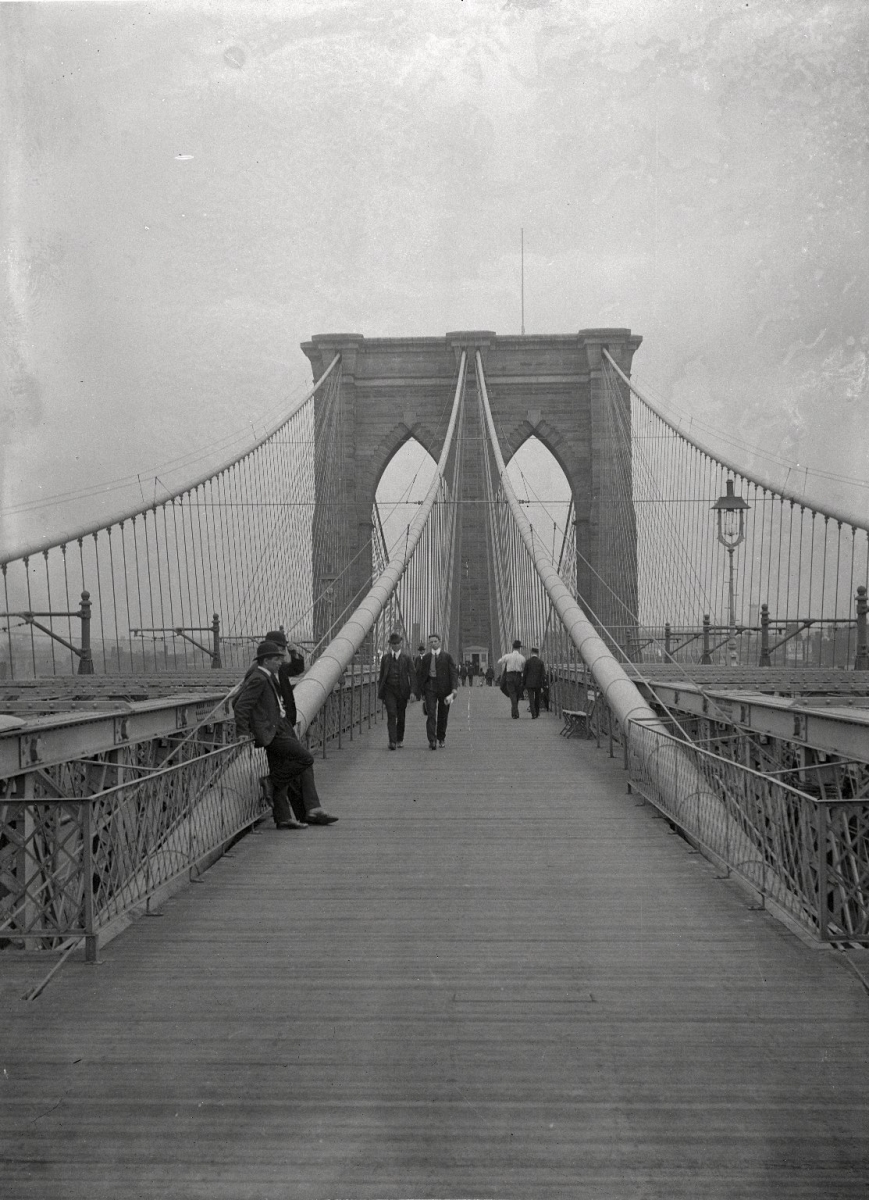
Brooklyn Bridge

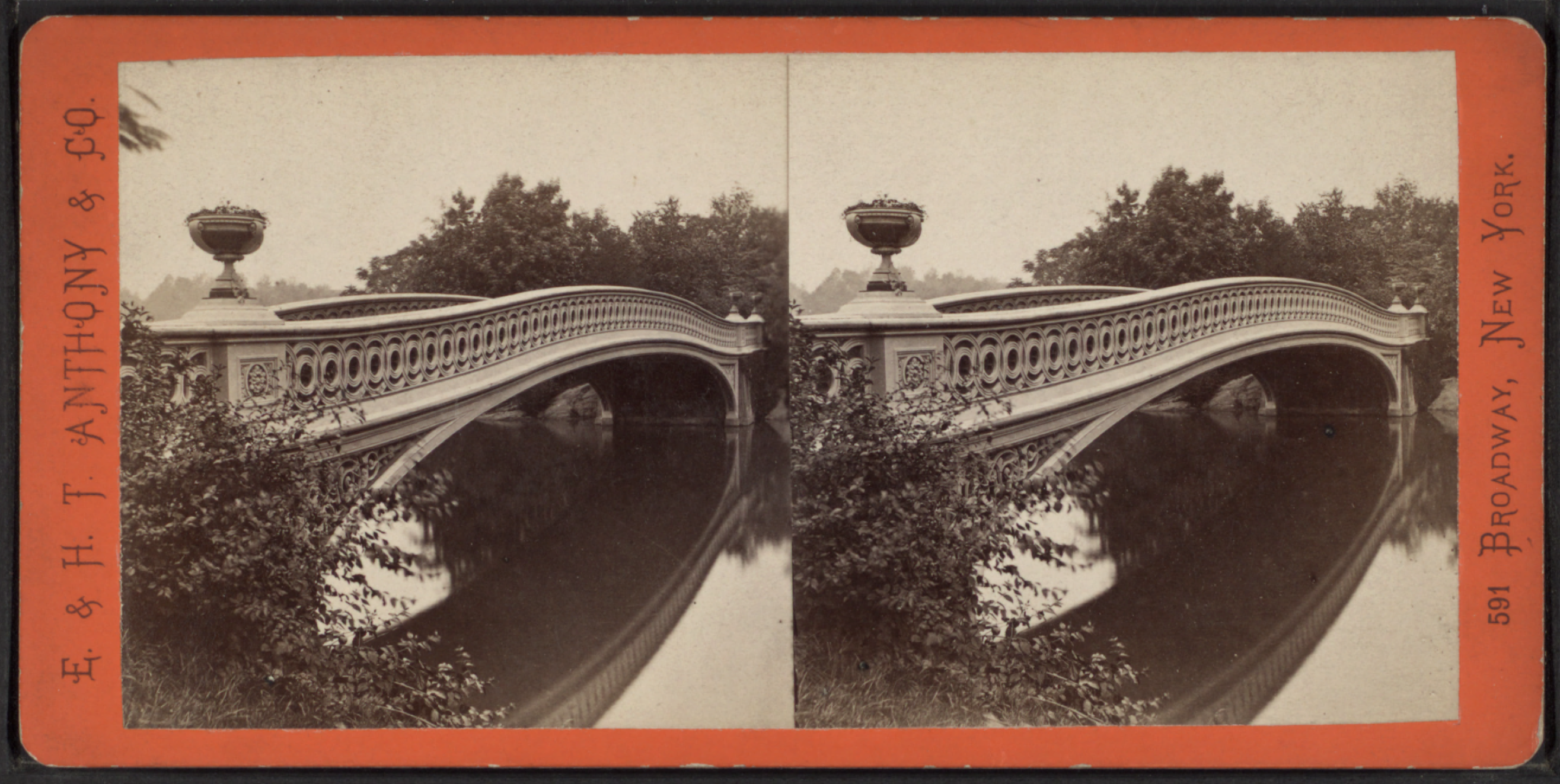
Bow Bridge

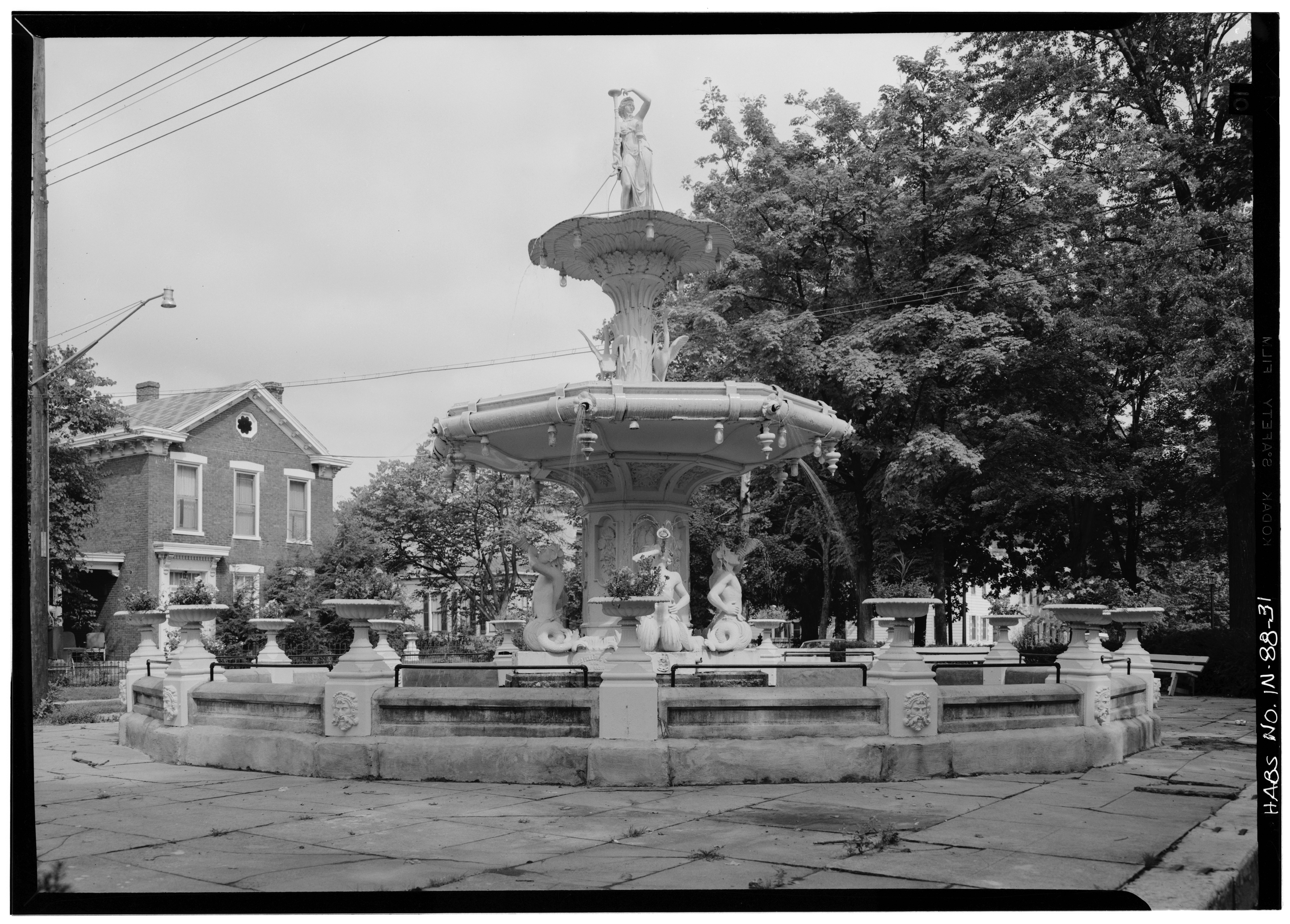
Broadway Fountain

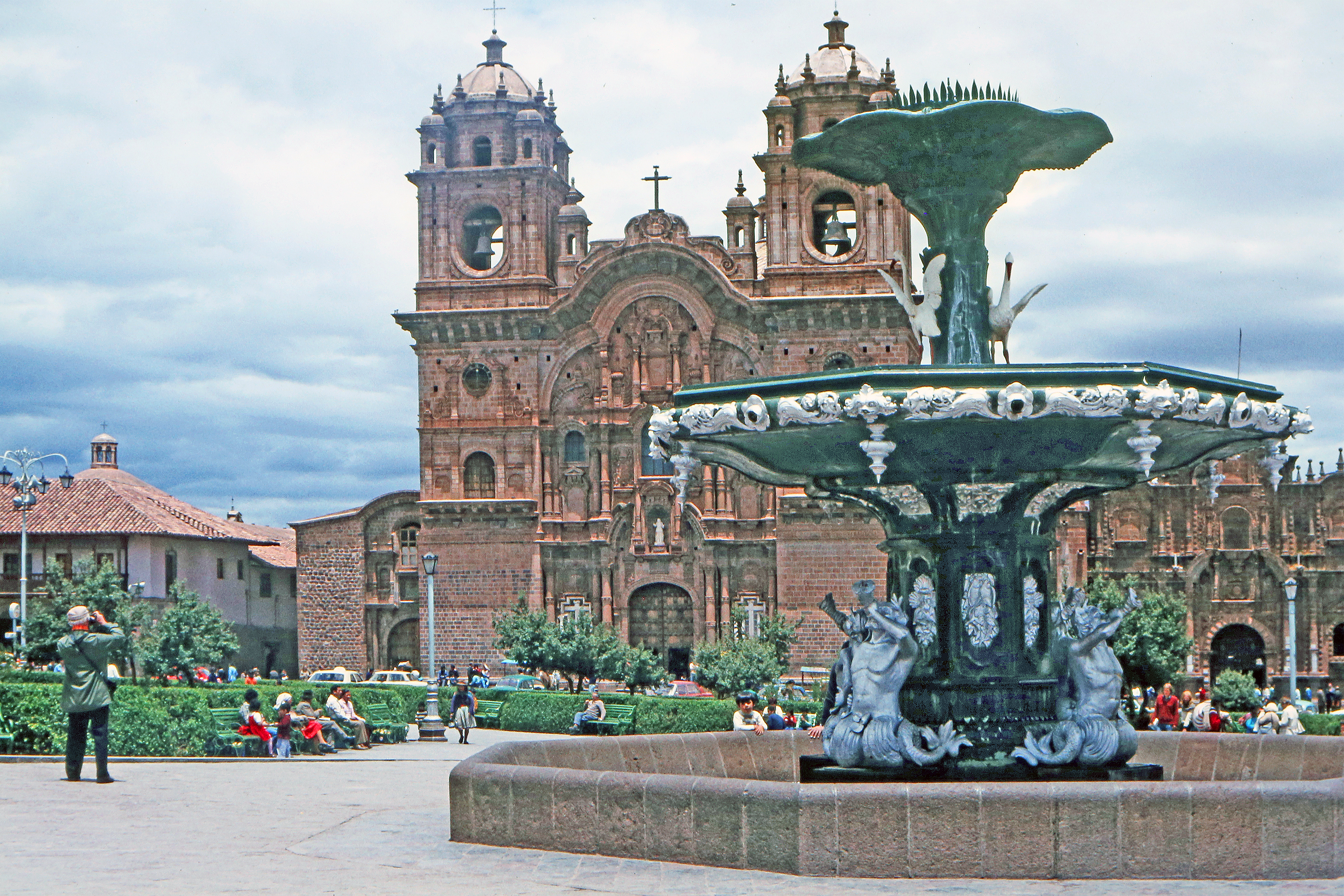
Plaza de Armas

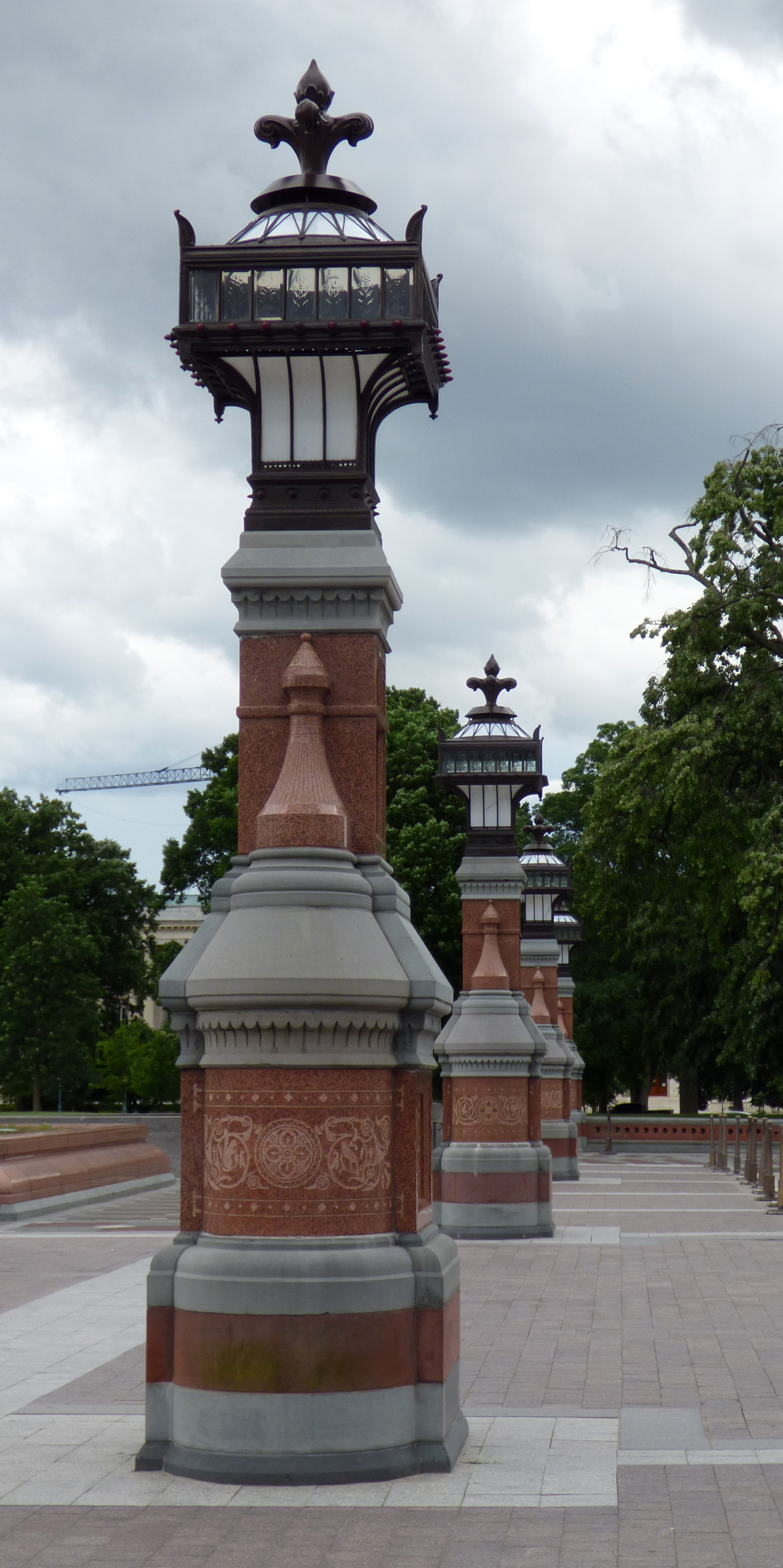
Capitol Lanterns

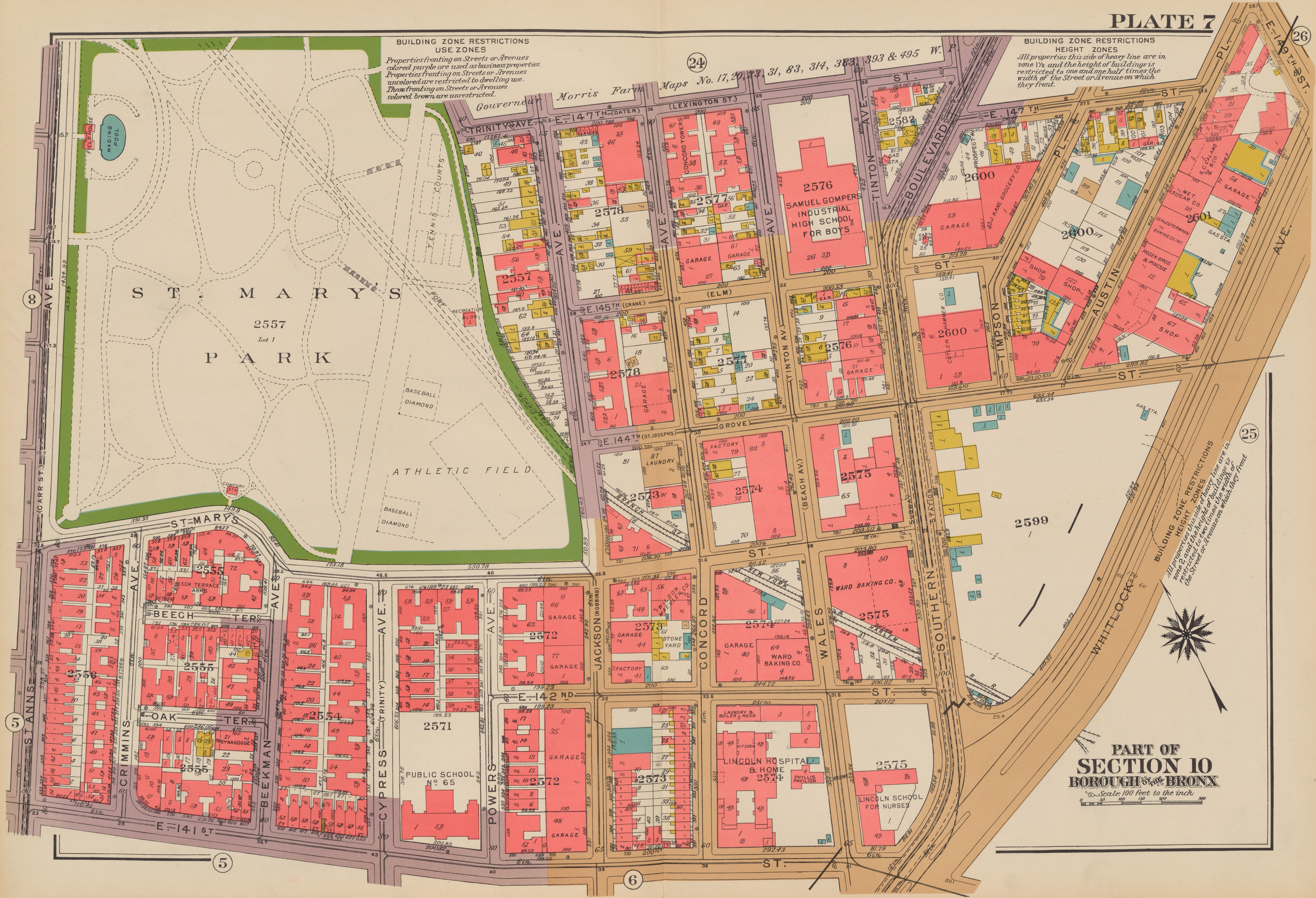
St. Mary's Park

=== Brooklyn Bridge ===
- The firm produced cast-iron railings for the Brooklyn Bridge

=== Bow Bridge ===
- Bow Bridge is one of the most iconic and photographed features of Central Park. Built in 1862, the bridge spans 60 feet across the Central Park Lake and connects Cherry Hill and the Ramble. Bow Bridge is named for its arc shape which resembles that of an archer's bow. It is the oldest cast-iron bridge in Central Park, and it is the second-oldest cast-iron bridge in the United States. It was designed by Calvert Vaux and Jacob Wrey Mould.

=== Fountains ===
- Forsyth Park Fountain at Forsyth Park in Savannah, Georgia (1858)
- Soldiers' Memorial Fountain in Poughkeepsie, New York (1870)
- Broadway Fountain in Madison, Indiana (first displayed at the 1876 Centennial Exposition; presented to Madison IN in 1884; replaced by a reproduction in 1981)
- Abbeville, South Carolina
- Plaza de Armas Fountain in Cusco, Peru
- Fountains were sent to Cuba, Haiti, the Sandwich Islands (Hawaii), Mexico, South America and China. (To be confirmed - Haitian fountain could be at Place Madan Kolo in Gonaives, Haiti - see photo)
- Advertisement for garden ornaments can be found here(1860)

=== Furniture ===
- In 1859, Congress ordered forty-eight benches for the Hall of the House of Representatives (i.e., the House chamber). The sides of the benches were designed by Constantino Brumidi and cast by Janes, Beebe & Co. The benches were loaned to several sites over the years. 14 of the benches (and 2 reproductions) now reside in the Capitol Rotunda. A photo of the bench can be found here.
- Janes, Beebe & Co. produced iron benches (settee) and chairs in the Victorian rustic style (commonly referred to as twig garden benches). A marked example is held by the Smithsonian Institution as inventory no. 1980.006. Unmarked examples are held by the Metropolitan Museum of Art as inv no. 69.159.2, the Brooklyn Museum as inv no. 72.180.4 and Historic New England as inv no. 1948.758. Benches with the foundry's makers mark are exceedingly rare.
- Cast-iron benches (attributed to Janes Beebe & Co.) were added by President Fillmore to the south grounds of the White House around 1852.
- By 1927, the firm was manufacturing a line of kitchen cabinets, called the "White House Line" (catalog I, catalog II) as advertised here

=== Sculptures and other works ===
- Advertisement for religious statuary can be found here
- Pillot dogs at the Pillot House in Sam Houston Park, Houston TX - The original sculptures (c.1870) were reproduced in 1989.
- Cast-iron gazebo was installed on the campus of Belmont University in Nashville, Tennessee in 1853.
- Cast-iron veranda, Zephaniah Jones House, 1024 10th Street, NW, Washington DC (apparently demolished).
- Janes also worked with cast zinc sculpture.
- Household items by Janes & Kirtland were included in the 1934 exhibition 'Machine Art' at the Museum of Modern Art, New York.

=== Cooking Ranges and Furnaces ===
- Furnaces installed in St. Patrick's Cathedral and Trinity Church.
- Stove in the Vanderbilt Mansion, Hyde Park NY
- Cooking range in the Edgar Allan Poe Cottage, Bronx NY
- Kitchen stove at Hyde Hall, Cooperstown NY, inventory no. 2014.22
- Cooking ranges in the late 19th century can be found in this catalog

=== St. Mary's Park ===
- St. Mary's Park (and a Protestant Episcopal church that once stood on Alexander Avenue and East 142nd Street until 1959) takes its name from Adrian's daughter, Mary. In the park's north end is Janes’ Hill, where the Janes mansion once stood.
