= New York Park Association =

NYC park lobbying group

- Formation: November 26, 1881; 144 years ago
- President: Waldo Hutchins

The New York Park Association was formed in 1881 or 1882 (references differ) by John Mullaly and other citizens. The group was concerned about urban growth. The group lobbied for the acquisition of land to create parks and parkways in New York City, and was instrumental in the passage of the New Parks Act in 1884.

According to The New York Times, the association was formed at the Fifth Avenue Hotel on November 26, 1881, with the objective of securing increased park space in New York City. John Mullaly was elected the association's secretary. A 1882 booklet published by the association lists Waldo Hutchins as their president. Land suitable for parks could be bought at the time for under $1,000 to $1,500 an acre. It was stated that the parks should be for the use of the people, and not, as Central Park now is, a great ornamental spot which is practically closed to the public by reason of the many restrictions imposed upon visitors.

The work of the association led to the creation of Van Cortlandt Park, Pelham Bay Park, Bronx Park, Crotona Park, and Claremont Park.
