= Bronx Park =

Public park in the Bronx, New York

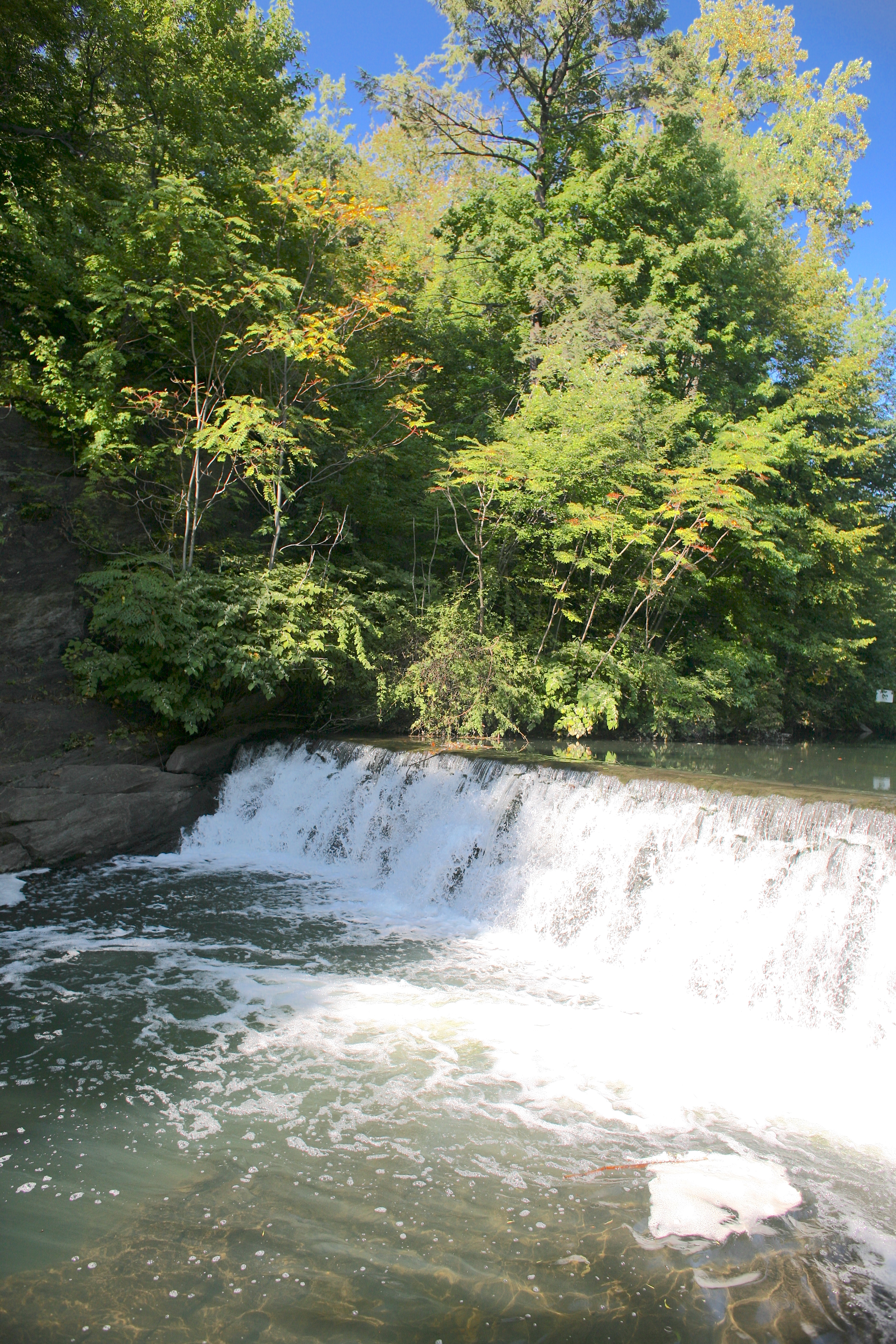
- Waterfall on the Bronx River at the south end of Bronx Park
- Interactive map of Bronx Park
- Type: Urban park
- Location: Bronx, New York City, New York, US
- Coordinates: 40°51′23″N 73°52′36″W
- Area: 718 acres (291 ha)
- Opened: 1888
- Operator: NYC Parks
- Status: Open
- Public transit: Subway: to East 180th Street, Bronx Park East, Pelham Parkway, Allerton Avenue, Burke Avenue, West Farms Square–East Tremont Avenue; Metro-North Railroad: Harlem Line to Botanical Garden; New York City Bus: Bx9, Bx12, Bx19, Bx22, Bx26, Bx39, Bx41; Bee-Line Bus: 60, 61, 62

Bronx Park is a public park along the Bronx River, in the Bronx, New York City. The park is bounded by Southern Boulevard to the southwest, Webster Avenue to the northwest, Gun Hill Road to the north, Bronx Park East to the east, and East 180th Street to the south. With an area of 718 acres (2.91 km^{2}), Bronx Park is the eighth-largest park in New York City.

Founded in the late 1880s, Bronx Park is the location of the New York Botanical Garden and the Bronx Zoo, which respectively occupy much of the northern and southern portions of the park. Fordham Road runs east–west between the zoo and botanical garden, bisecting Bronx Park, while the Bronx River Parkway runs north–south near the eastern edge. The park is operated by the New York City Department of Parks and Recreation.

== History ==
The land for Bronx Park was acquired with funds authorized by the 1884 New Parks Act, which was intended to preserve lands that would soon become part of New York City. Much of the land was acquired from Fordham University, which gave away the land on the condition that it be used as a zoo and botanical garden. Other sections were obtained from the family of Pierre Lorillard, who operated the Lorillard Snuff Mill in what is now the New York Botanical Garden within the northern section of Bronx Park. The snuff mill, a National Historic Landmark, still remains and is the oldest existing tobacco manufacturing building in the United States. Land was also acquired from the Lydig family, another prominent local family, who had bought it from the DeLanceys, yet another local family.

The original 640 acres (2.6 km^{2}) were acquired in 1888–1889. The northernmost 250 acres (1.0 km^{2}) were allocated in 1891 to the New York Botanical Society. Another 261 acres (106 ha) were allocated in 1897 to the New York Zoological Society. An additional 66 acres (270,000 m^{2}) were acquired in 1906, at the southeast end of the park; this area is now known as Ranaqua, where the Parks headquarters is located.

== Attractions and facilities ==
Much of Bronx Park is taken up by the Bronx Zoo and New York Botanical Garden, both of which are private entities. However, the New York City Department of Parks and Recreation (NYC Parks) still pays for some of the maintenance costs. According to NYC Parks, Bronx Park is 718 acres (2.91 km^{2}), making it the third-largest park in the Bronx and the eighth-largest park in the city. However, another measurement in the Encyclopedia of New York City places the park as only being 662 acres (268 ha) in area.

As originally stipulated in the New Parks Act, Bronx Park is the center of a system of parks across the Bronx. Mosholu Parkway runs to Van Cortlandt Park in the northwest, while Pelham Parkway runs to Pelham Bay Park in the east, and Southern Boulevard/Crotona Parkway runs to Crotona Park in the south. The park is crossed by a road connecting Fordham Road to the west and Pelham Parkway to the east. Adjacent neighborhoods include Pelham Parkway to the east, West Farms to the south, and Belmont to the west.

=== Zoo and botanical garden ===
The New York Botanical Garden is located on the northern side of Bronx Park, west of the Bronx River Parkway. It was founded by the New York Botanical Society in 1891. The botanical garden covers 250 acres in total. Much of this is the former grounds of the Lorillard estate, although the garden also includes a parcel that was formerly the easternmost portion of the campus of St. John's College (now Fordham University). The Botanical Garden contains more than a million living plants on its grounds, as well as the LuEsther T. Mertz Library and the Enid A. Haupt Conservatory. Since 1967, the Botanical Garden has been a National Historic Landmark.

The Bronx Zoo is located on the southern side of Bronx Park, west of the Bronx River Parkway. Founded by the New York Zoological Society, it first opened on November 8, 1899. The zoo covers 265 acres (107 ha), making it among the United States' largest urban zoos. The zoo contains about 4,000 animals from 600 species. The Bronx Zoo has several landmarked features, including the Rainey Memorial Gates at the Fordham Road entrance, which is a New York City designated landmark and a National Register of Historic Places listing.

=== Other facilities ===
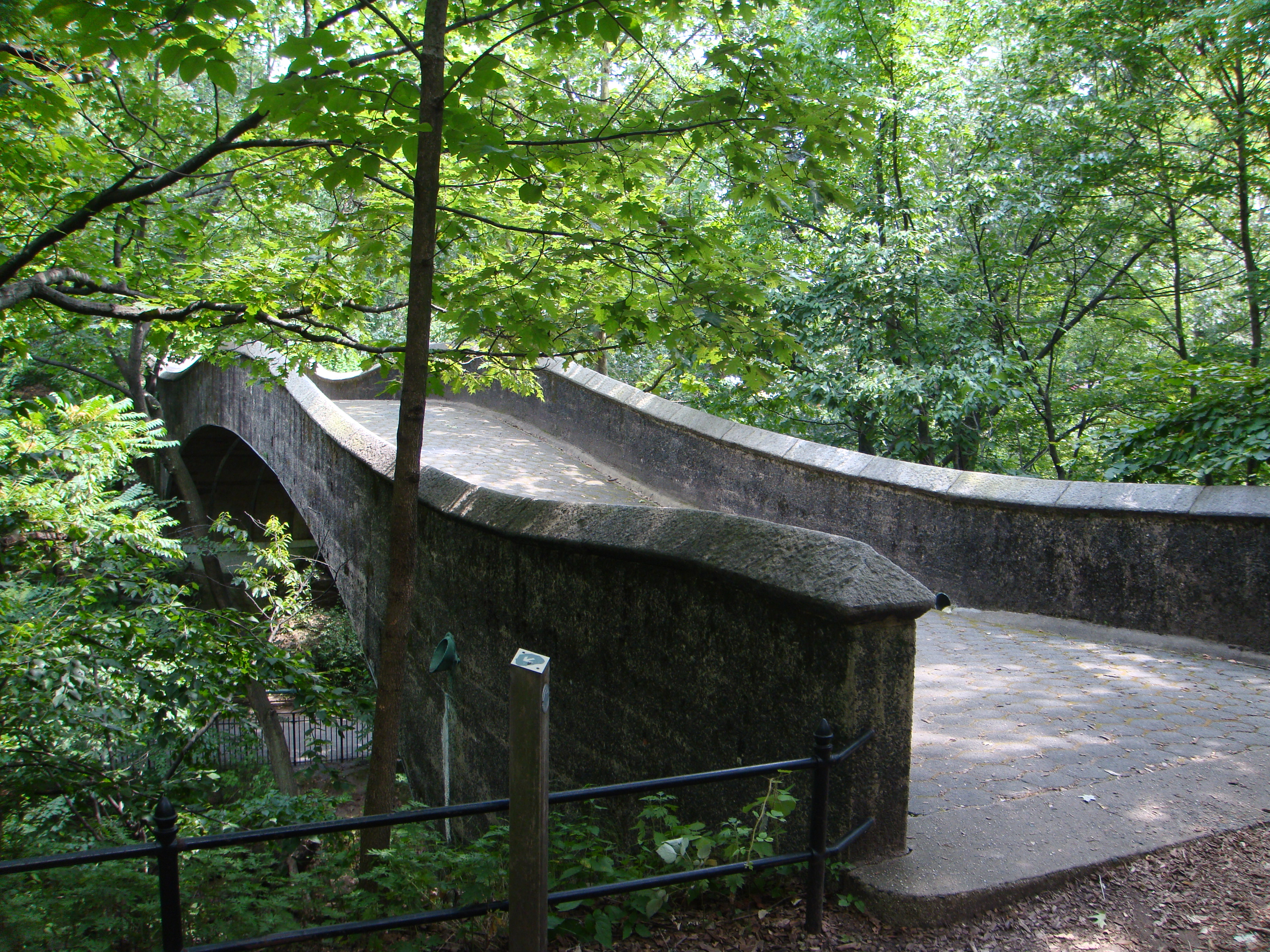
A bridge within the New York Botanical Garden, in Bronx Park

The eastern section of Bronx Park contains several recreational facilities that mainly serve the neighborhoods to its east. These include areas for baseball, basketball, bocce, football, handball, soccer, and tennis. There are also hiking trails, kayaking sites, playgrounds, a skate park, and spray showers. Of the seven playgrounds in Bronx Park, four are located on Bronx Park East or Bronx River Parkway: Ben Abrams Playground, Brady Playground, Waring Playground, and Rosewood Playground. The park also has three bicycle paths; the longest is a north–south path on Bronx River Parkway, but bikeways also run northwest along Mosholu Parkway and east along Pelham Parkway.

The northern section of Bronx Park is classified by NYC Parks as a Forever Wild nature preserve. The preserve occupies 35 acres (14 ha) and is permanently closed off to development. The preserve is mainly composed of a floodplain forest with eastern hemlock and hardwoods, through which several walking trails run. The forest is believed to be the only woodland in New York City that has never been cleared. In addition, there is another set of ballfields called the Allerton Avenue Ballfields adjacent to the preserve. The ballfields are named after Daniel Allerton, an early Bronx settler, and consist of three baseball fields and a comfort station. The Bronx Skate Park is located nearby on Bronx Park East between Allerton Avenue and Britton Street, near the northeast corner of Bronx Park. Two playgrounds, French Charley's Playground and Frisch Field, are also adjacent to the northern section of Bronx Park.

The southeast section, known as Ranaqua, is used as NYC Parks' Bronx headquarters. The name is an Algonquin (Delaware) word for "End Place", the original name of the peninsula that was sold in 1639 to the Bronx's namesake Jonas Bronck. The current brick buildings that comprise Ranaqua were built in the 1930s as part of a Works Progress Administration project. There is also a trash dump next to Ranaqua; since it is operated by NYC Parks, it is not registered with the state government, as most landfills in New York are.

The southwest corner of Bronx Park contains River Park, a small park and playground that overlooks the Bronx River south of the zoo. The park is located just south of the 182nd Street Dam, a small cascade on the river.

The park has five entrances:

- Main Entrance: at 2900 Southern Boulevard
- Mosholu Entrance: 2950 Southern Boulevard
- Bedford Park Gate: at the corner of Southern Boulevard and Bedford Park Boulevard
- Everett Garden Gate: on Southern Boulevard
- East Gate: at the corner of Waring Avenue and Bronx Park East

== Watercourses ==
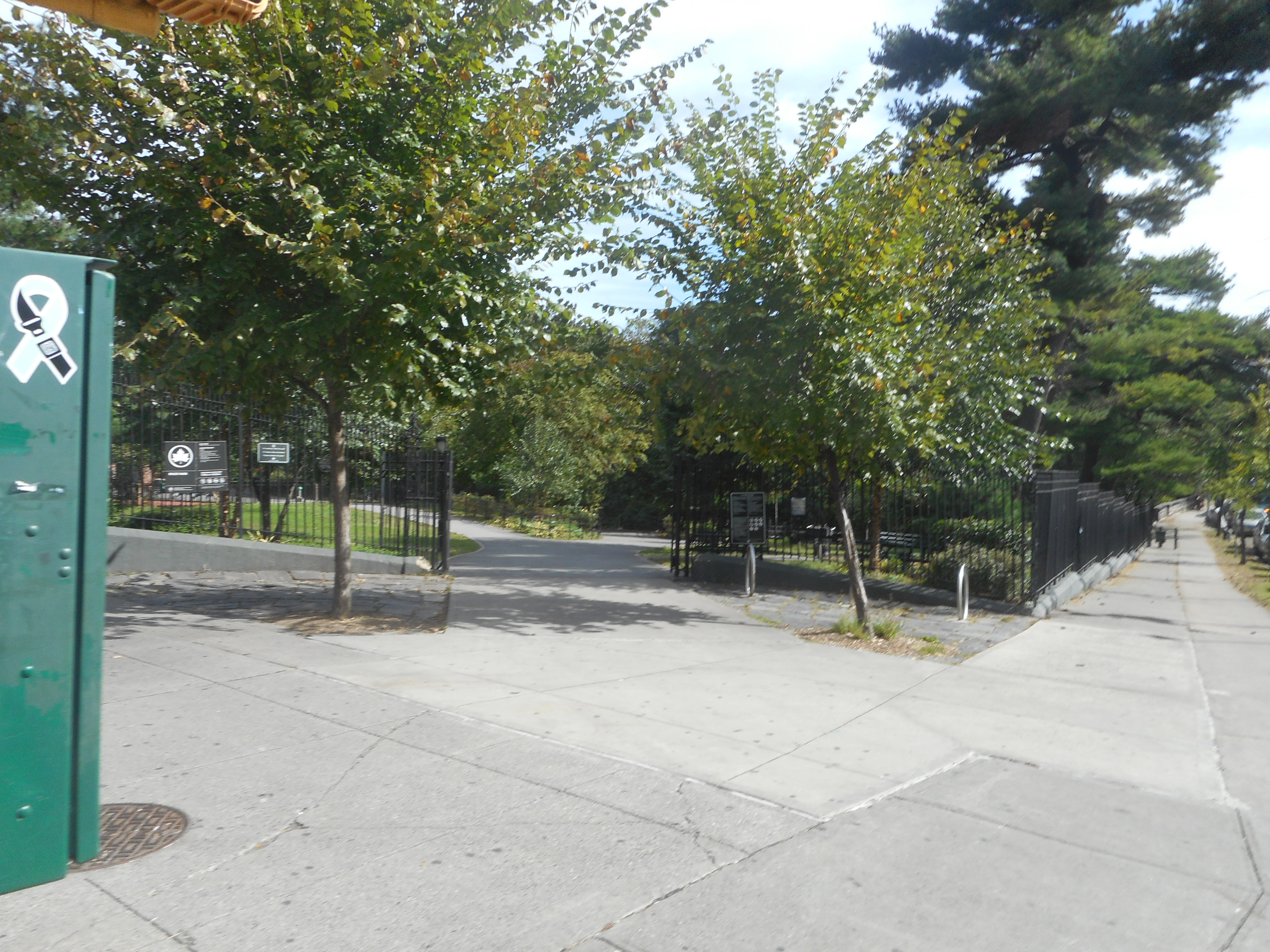
River Park entrance

=== River ===
The main watercourse in Bronx Park is the Bronx River, which flows southward from Westchester County to the East River, running for 2 miles (3.2 km) through the park. The section of river within the park is for the most part a natural watercourse. The river hosts a diverse ecosystem with a hardwood swamp and floodplain forest composed of red maple trees. A number of tributaries run into the river from both the New York Botanical Garden and the Bronx Zoo. The river, once a heavily polluted waterway, was cleaned up in the late 20th century due to an effort led by the Bronx River Alliance. The Mitsubishi Riverwalk, a free public trail along the Bronx River that opened in 2004, runs along the eastern bank of the river within the Bronx Zoo's Boston Road parking lot.

There are three waterfalls in Bronx Park. The first is a cascade near the Lorillard Snuff Mill. To the south is a waterfall of pink granite, about 12 feet (3.7 m) high, located slightly upstream of the Boston Road entrance to the zoo. At this location, there is a small island that splits the waterfall into two cascades. A third waterfall is the 182nd Street Dam near River Park. It was formerly used by the DeLancey family, which operated a farm in what is now the Wild Asia section of the Bronx Zoo, but now consists of a Fordham gneiss dam with a fish ladder. As such, the 182nd Street Dam was known as Delancey's Falls, and also as Lydig's Falls after another local family.

=== Lakes ===
Within Bronx Park, there are two large lakes of note along the Bronx River. South of Fordham Road, the river widens into a small lake called Lake Agassiz, which is fed by two streams within the zoo. The lake was described as being 6 acres (2.4 ha) in the early 20th century, although in 1971, 3 acres (1.2 ha) of Lake Agassiz were taken by land reclamation for a new bison "prairie" in the Bronx Zoo.

A larger lake, the 25-acre (10 ha) Bronx Lake, is located south of Lake Agassiz and stretches for nearly 1 mile (1.6 km) through the zoo. It was previously used for boating, and a 1912 New York Times article mentioned that over 46,000 people had used boats in the lake in 1911. The Bronx Lake used to have a boathouse north of the 182nd Street Dam, but it was demolished after the 1950s. In 1983, the JungleWorld exhibit in the Bronx Zoo was built atop the site of the boathouse.

In addition, there are several ponds not connected to the river. Cope Lake, located near the Fordham Road entrance to the Bronx Zoo, is a pond that predates the zoo. In the mid-20th century it became used by pelicans. However, the pelicans were moved to an indoor exhibit inside the zoo in the 1990s. In 2009, the Center for Global Conservation opened on the lake. Another pond, Twin Lake, is located at the northern portion of Bronx Park, next to the Pfizer Lab in the New York Botanical Garden. It is popularly known as French Charley's after a restaurant located there in the 19th century. The scenic ponds were formerly a public area, but were confiscated by the botanical garden, causing an uproar on the part of the local community. The lakes had previously been a very popular winter ice skating venue, with free access.
