= St. Mary's Park (Bronx) =

Public park in the Bronx, New York

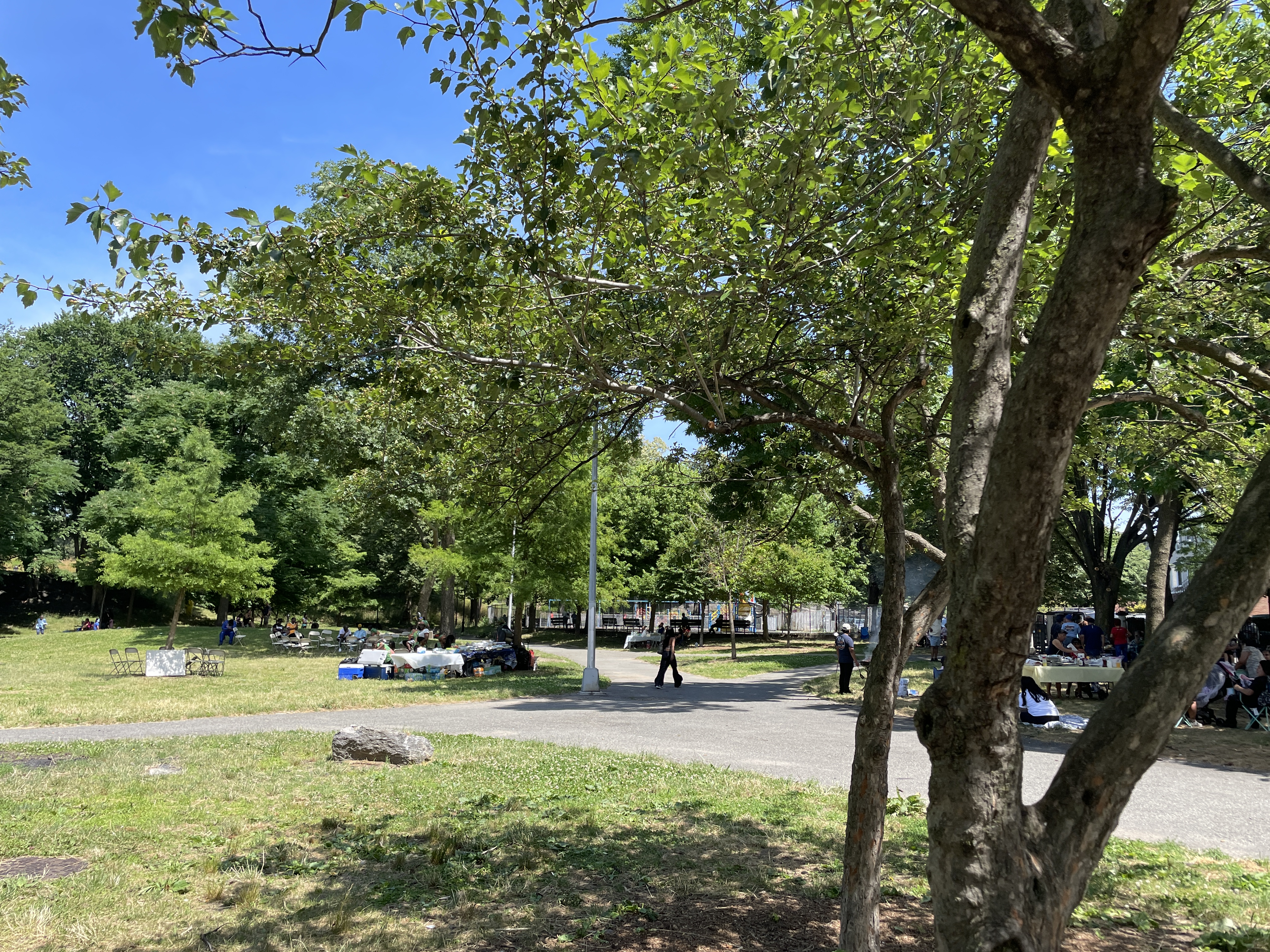
- St. Mary's Park in 2024.
- Interactive map of St. Mary's Park
- Location: Mott Haven, Bronx, New York City
- Coordinates: 40°48′40″N 73°54′42″W
- Area: 35.31 acres (14.29 hectares)
- Operator: New York City Department of Parks and Recreation
- Status: Open all year

St. Mary's Park is a public park in the Mott Haven neighborhood in the South Bronx section of The Bronx, New York City. The park has sporting facilities and an indoor recreation center.

== History ==
=== 19th century ===
Originally part of the estate of Jonas Bronck (1600–1643), for whom the Bronx is named, it was occupied by a group of Loyalist military refugees during the Revolutionary War, as a camp. Years later the land was held by the family of Gouverneur Morris (1752–1816), one of the authors of the U.S. Constitution.

In April 1857 Adrian Janes purchased the land from Gouverneur Morris II and lived in a mansion on the property. A photo of his residence can be viewed here. Janes owned a local iron foundry that manufactured the Dome of the U.S. Capitol Building, the Bow Bridge in Central Park and railings for the Brooklyn Bridge. St. Mary's Park (and a Protestant Episcopal church that once stood on the property at Alexander Ave and E 142nd St until 1959) takes its name from Adrian's daughter, Mary. In the park’s north end is Janes’ Hill, where the Janes mansion once stood.

During the mid-19th century, a segment of the Spuyten Duyvil and Port Morris Railroad (est. 1842) was built through the land. The line was acquired by the New York and Harlem Railroad in 1853, which itself was acquired by the New York Central and Hudson River Railroad in 1864, and transformed it into a freight branch.

In 1874, New York City annexed parts of the southern Bronx from Westchester County. Seeking to create public parks in the Bronx, journalist John Mullaly (1835–1915) founded the New York Park Association in 1881. His efforts culminated in the 1884 New Parks Act and the city's 1888–90 purchase of lands for St. Mary's, and several other large parks throughout the borough, including three parkways. St. Mary's Park was named for a Protestant Episcopal church that stood three blocks to the west until 1959.

=== 20th century ===
In 1903, the New York City Department of Parks and Recreation granted the New York Central Railroad permission to lay tracks underneath the park, as part of the realignment of the Spuyten Duyvil and Port Morris Railroad line. The 2,200-to-2,300-foot-long (670 to 700 m) tunnel was finally built through the park in 1905, and the former segment of the line was eventually abandoned, and the 1.2 acres (0.49 ha) occupied by the tracks were returned to the park in 1912. Parkland was expanded further by an additional .8 acres (0.32 ha) in 1968.

The park spawned numerous recreation programs in the Bronx. The borough's first playground opened in St. Mary's Park in 1914. At this time, the park also had a baseball diamond, two tennis courts, and a children's farm garden. In response to rapid population growth and residential construction in the neighborhood, three additional playgrounds opened in the park between 1938 and 1941. After World War II, Parks Commissioner Robert Moses inaugurated a citywide recreation program to provide places to play and socialize in cold weather months. New York's first full-service, indoor recreation center opened at St. Mary's in 1951. Designed by the architectural firm of Brown, Lawford, and Forbes, the building housed an indoor swimming pool, gymnasium, locker and shower rooms, and meeting rooms for classes and community programs. Murals of Marvel Comics superheroes were painted in the center in the early 1970s and repainted in 1991.

In 1996, a quarter-mile fitness loop and two additional tennis courts were installed in St. Mary's Park with city funds allocated by the City Council.

=== 21st century ===
In 2006, the Parks Department completed the installation of synthetic turf at the park. New York Road Runners hosts a weekly 2.75-mile Open Run.

By the 2010s, the park was saturated with drug needles and drug users. The New York Post found that 21,434 needles had been collected within the park between May and October 2018. Efforts to stop the amount of needles within the park, particularly through specially placed receptacles, had not been successful, with just 163 needles being collected between May and October 2018.

Though St. Mary's Park is the largest park in the surrounding area, it was too small to have an advocacy group to lobby for the park's renovation. In 2015, New York City Council speaker Melissa Mark-Viverito allocated $1.5 million toward the renovation of one of the playgrounds. The next year, $30 million in funding was allocated for further improvements to the park's recreational facilities as part of the city's Anchor Parks program. St. Mary's Playground West was renovated for $4 million between 2018 and 2019. The project removed fencing; renovated the basketball courts, swings, and spray showers; and upgraded picnic and seating areas. A second phase began in 2019 and comprises improvements between St. Ann's Avenue and East 143rd Street, including a new amphitheater, plaza, and benches. The entire project is slated to cost $19.6 million. That phase of renovation was completed in October 2021,

The St. Mary’s Recreation Center closed for renovations in early 2022; though the center was supposed to reopen after 18 months, the project's completion was later postponed to January 2026. The delays were attributed to various issues with the structure, such as drainage issues and the poor condition of the facade. During the recreation center's closure, local residents avoided the park, citing the ongoing drug issues. The New York Times wrote in 2025 that the park had become "a place where people shoot up and nod off under stately oak trees, and where the grass and rocks are littered with needles and broken glass."
