= Washington Apartments (New York City) =

- Location within New York City

General information
- Architectural style: Queen Anne
- Location: 2034-2040 Adam Clayton Powell, Jr. Boulevard, New York City, United States
- Coordinates: 40.8068988°N 73.9501784°W
- Construction started: 1883
- Construction stopped: 1884

Technical details
- Material: brick
- Floor count: 8

Design and construction
- Architect: Mortimer C. Merritt
- Developer: Edward H.M. Just
- Designations: New York City Landmark

The Washington Apartments are an apartment building in the New York City borough of Manhattan. Completed in 1884, it is notable for being the first apartment building in central Harlem. The New York City Landmarks Preservation Commission designated the building a historic landmark on July 15, 1991.
