= List of films shot in Harlem =

This is a list of films shot in Harlem, in New York City.

- Moon Over Harlem, 1939
- Paradise in Harlem, 1939
- Hi De Ho, 1947
- In the Street, 1948
- The Cool World, 1963
- The Pawnbroker, 1964
- Topaz, 1969
- Harlem School 1970, 1970
- Cotton Comes to Harlem, 1970
- Black Roots, 1970
- Shaft, 1971
- Across 110th Street, 1972
- Come Back, Charleston Blue, 1972
- Shaft's Big Score, 1972
- Super Fly, 1972
- Black Caesar, 1973
- Ganja & Hess, 1973
- Gordon's War, 1973
- Hell Up in Harlem, 1973
- Live and Let Die, 1973
- Claudine, 1974
- Aaron Loves Angela, 1975
- The Brother from Another Planet, 1984
- The Cotton Club, 1984
- Looking for Langston, 1988
- Harlem Nights, 1989
- King of New York, 1990
- Paris Is Burning, 1990
- Reversal of Fortune, 1990 (City College of New York in Harlem, was used to depict Harvard University.)
- Strictly Business, 1991
- A Rage in Harlem, 1991
- New Jack City, 1991
- Jungle Fever, 1991
- Juice, 1992
- Who's the Man?, 1993
- Sugar Hill, 1994
- Above the Rim, 1994
- A Great Day in Harlem, 1994
- Die Hard with a Vengeance, 1995
- New Jersey Drive, 1995
- The Royal Tenenbaums, 2001
- Paid in Full, 2002
- 25th Hour, 2002 (scenes filmed in Shepard Hall, City College of New York)
- The Hebrew Hammer, 2003 (scene filmed under the 125th Street viaduct)
- Killa Season, 2006
- August Rush, 2007
- Pride and Glory, 2007
- American Gangster, 2007
- The Ministers, 2007
- The Brave One, 2007
- Precious, 2009
- NYC 22, 2011 (TV series)
- Kill Your Darlings, 2012 (filmed on Astor Row)
- The Secret Life of Walter Mitty, 2012
- Monica Z, 2012
- Black Nativity, 2013
- Annie, 2014
- Harlemites, 2017 (Film series)
