= Manhattan Avenue–West 120th–123rd Streets Historic District =

Historic district in Manhattan, New York

- U.S. National Register of Historic Places
- U.S. Historic district
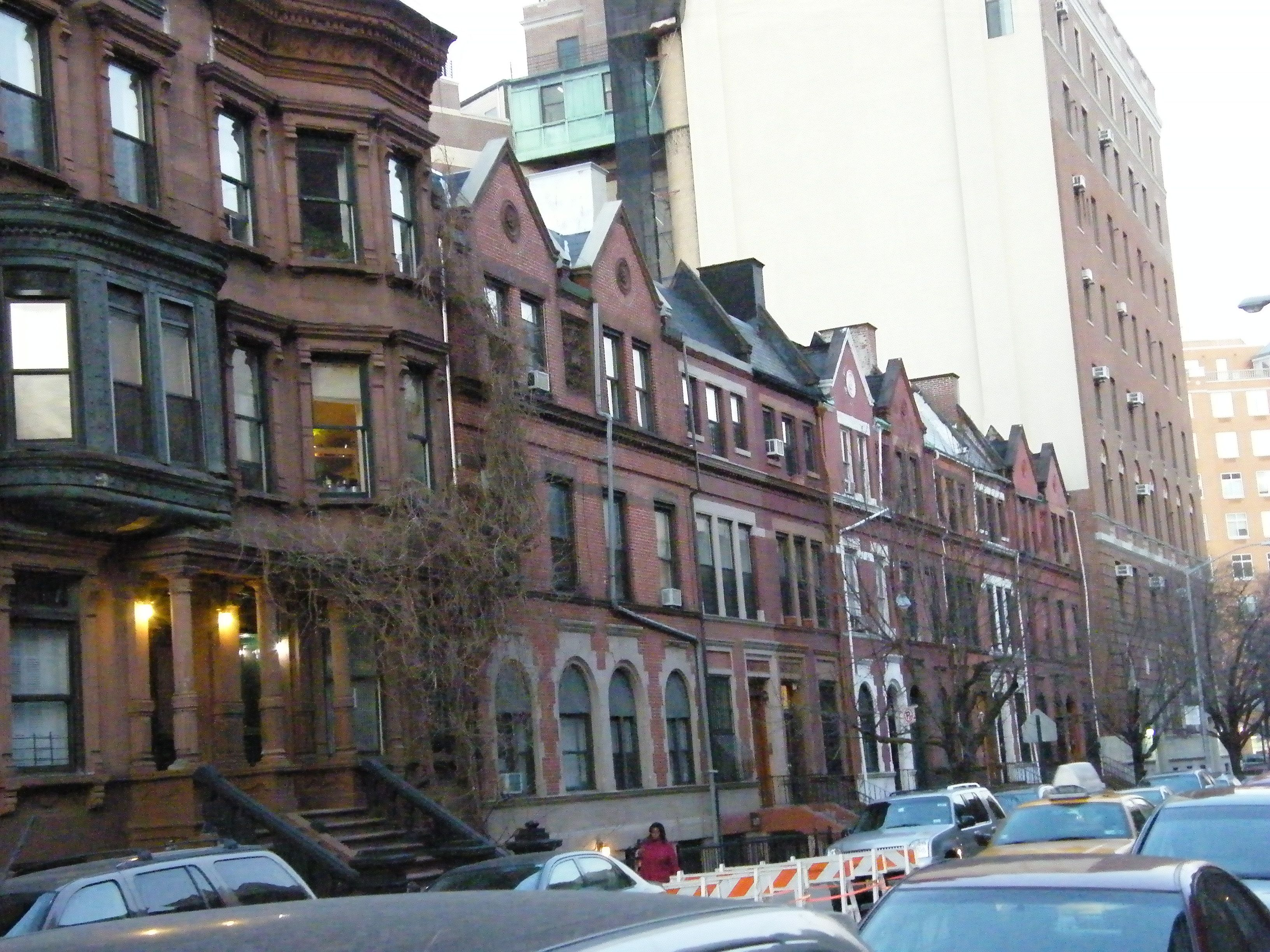
- Manhattan Avenue-West 120th–123rd Streets Historic District, March 2009

- Location within New York City Location within New York Location within the United States
- Location: 242–262 W. 120th St., 341–362 W. 121st St., 341–362 W. 122nd St., 344–373 123rd St., 481–553 Manhattan Ave., New York, New York
- Coordinates: 40°48′32″N 73°57′19″W
- Architect: J. A. Webster, et al.
- Architectural style: Renaissance, Queen Anne, Greek Revival
- NRHP reference No.: 91001920
- Added to NRHP: January 17, 1992

Manhattan Avenue–West 120th–123rd Streets Historic District is a national historic district in the Harlem neighborhood of Manhattan in New York City. It consists of 113 contributing residential rowhouses built between 1886 and 1896. The buildings are three story brownstone and brick rowhouses over raised basements in the Queen Anne, Romanesque, and Neo-Grec styles.

It was listed on the National Register of Historic Places in 1992.
