= Concourse, Bronx =

Neighborhood in New York City

Concourse
- Neighborhood of the Bronx
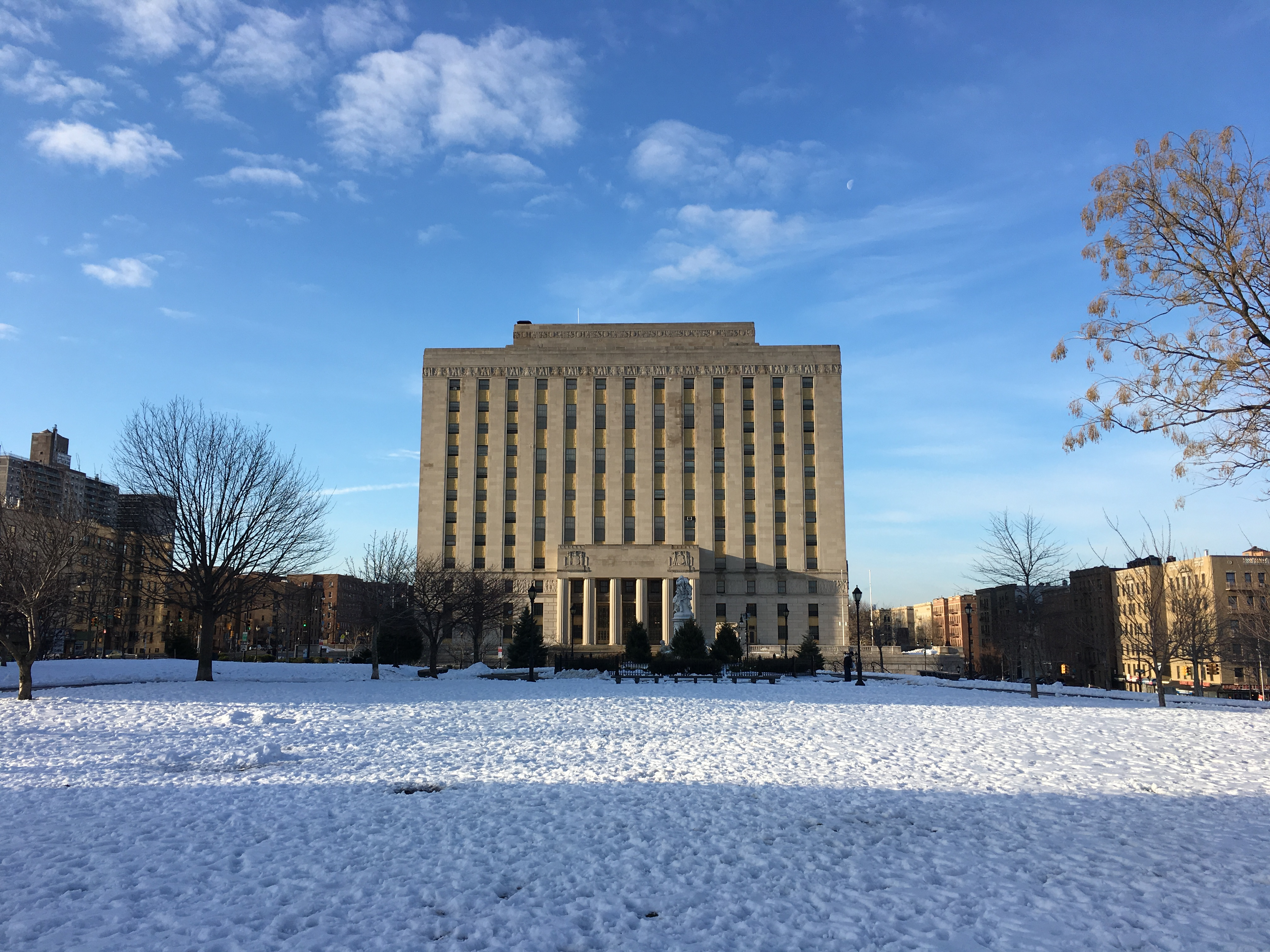
- Bronx Courthouse serves as Bronx Borough Hall
- Interactive map of Concourse
- Coordinates: 40.827°N 73.923°W
- Country: United States
- State: New York
- City: New York City
- Borough: The Bronx

Population (2010)
  - Total: 75,371
- ZIP Codes: 10451, 10452
- Area code: 718, 347, 929, and 917

Concourse is a neighborhood in the southwestern section of the New York City borough of the Bronx which includes the Bronx County Courthouse, the Bronx Museum of the Arts, and Yankee Stadium. Its boundaries, starting from the north and moving clockwise, are East 169th Street to the north, Webster Avenue to the east, East 149th Street to the south, and Jerome Avenue and Harlem River to the west. The neighborhood is divided into three subsections: West Concourse, East Concourse, and Concourse Village with the Grand Concourse being its main thoroughfare.

The neighborhood is part of Bronx Community Board 4, and its ZIP Codes are 10451 and 10452. The local subway lines are the IND Concourse Line (B and D trains), operating along the Grand Concourse, and the IRT Jerome Avenue Line (4 train), operating along River Avenue. The area is patrolled by the NYPD's 44th Precinct.

== Location ==
The neighborhood is in the South Bronx in the southwestern part of the borough, centered on the intersection of Grand Concourse and 161st Street. It is bordered to the west by Highbridge and the Harlem River; to the north by Mount Eden; to the east by Claremont Village, Melrose, and Morrisania; and to the south by Mott Haven.

The neighborhoods follows a street grid with avenues crossing east–west streets. Retail is located on streets, and with the exception of Morris Avenue, the avenues are largely residential above 153rd Street. The neighborhood character is more industrialized along the river with the exception of park space and the Bronx Terminal Market. Other large retail nodes are located on 161st Street and adjacent blocks, at Concourse Plaza. Smaller retail nodes are located on 165th Street and on 167th Street.

The elevation varies from sea level at the Harlem River short to its highest point of elevation of 110 feet (34 m) in Franz Sigel Park. In fact, George Washington and his troops utilized some of these elevations during the American Revolutionary War as vantage points to monitor activity along the Harlem River. Elevation can vary greatly, with the Grand Concourse 20 feet higher than adjacent avenues in some instances.

== History ==
=== Early history ===
From European settlement through the late 1800s, the Concourse area occupied wooded lands and rocky formations within and on the periphery of the estate of the prominent Morris family who farmed in what is now Southwest Bronx. Until 1845, the area was part of the Town of Westchester within Westchester County. After the subdivision of the Town of Westchester in 1845, the Concourse area became part of the Town of West Farms. In 1855, West Farms was further subdivided and the Town of Morrisania was created.

With the promise of city services, the Morrisania along with the Towns of West Farms and Kingsbridge seceded from Westchester County to join Manhattan as part of New York County. The three towns were referred to as the "Annexed District". In 1896, the vast majority of what is now the Bronx joined New York County. In 1898 the City of Greater New York and Borough of the Bronx were formed, and all former Westchester County annexations within New York County were reconstituted into the independent County of the Bronx in 1914.

=== 20th century ===
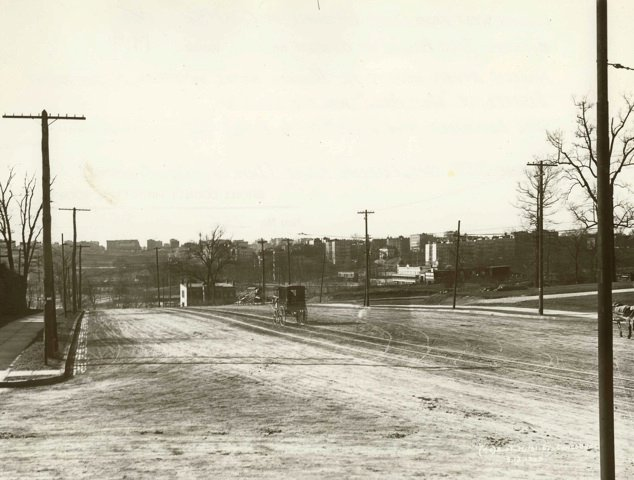
161st Street in 1900

Expansion of the subway system enabled rapid development of the Concourse. The first subway crossed under 149th Street into the area in 1906 and is now the IRT White Plains Road Line (2 and 5 trains). The IRT Jerome Avenue Line opened a decade later in 1917 and spurred enormous development in the area. Concurrent with subway development and inspired by the City Beautiful movement, the New York City built the Grand Boulevard and Concourse (shortened to the Grand Concourse). Modeled after Paris' Champs-Élysées, the original boulevard stretched from the Bronx Courthouse to near Van Cortlandt Park, but was later extended south to 138th Street by supplanting the existing Mott Avenue. The Grand Concourse was further improved by the extension of the IND Concourse Line (B and D trains) under most of its length in 1933.

Yankee Stadium was built 1923 when Jacob Ruppert moved the team from the Polo Grounds in Manhattan, where the Yankees shared space with the New York Giants, to the Bronx. With the exception of a brief period in the 1970s, the Yankees have been in Concourse for almost 100 years.

Infrastructure and services brought residents. Some of the 500,000 people who moved to the borough in the 1920s lived in the Concourse. The new construction to accommodate those residents was inspired by the City Beautiful movement and the 1901 Tenement House Act, which mandated light, air, and fire protection. This yielded 5- and 6- story multifamily residential buildings throughout the neighborhood built in a variety of styles from Tudor, Renaissance, and Colonial Revival to Art Deco and Art Moderne.

In 1945, the Bronx Marian apparitions drew 30,000 pilgrims to see the site of an alleged apparition.

In the late 1930s the Works Progress Administration dubbed the area "the Park Avenue for the Middle Class", and the area maintained that reputation through the 1950s. The Concourse inspired visits by presidential candidate Franklin D. Roosevelt, Harry S. Truman, and John F. Kennedy. However, after 1960, the area began to decline quickly due to white flight, incentives to move to the suburbs, redlining, the development of Co-Op City, disinvestment by New York City, and arson. While no buildings burned down in the Concourse during the period, the population of the area declined until the 1990s when the population started to rebound.

=== 21st century ===
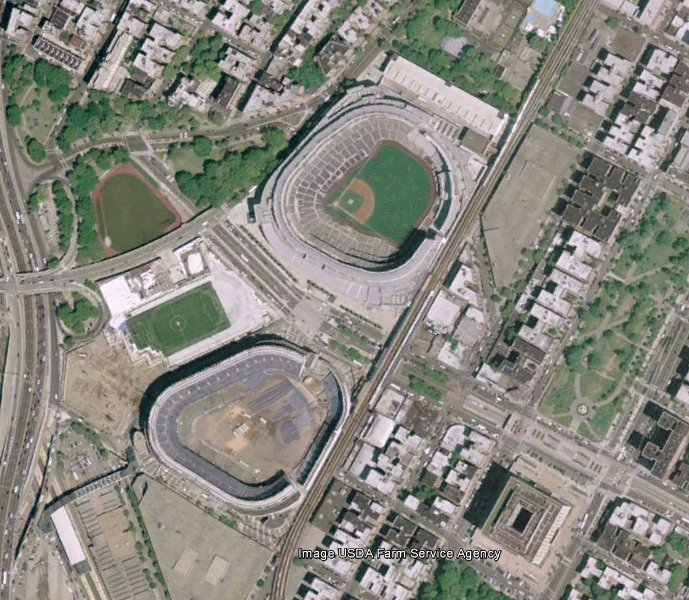
View of both old and new Yankee Stadium

Recent developments in the Concourse include construction and neighborhood improvements, and the neighborhood is gentrifying as of 2012. The Yankees built a new stadium in 2009. The former stadium was demolished; a large public park—Heritage Field—was established in its place. The Bronx Museum of the Arts undertook a major expansion in 2006, and is currently undergoing another addition. The Bronx Hall of Justice opened in 2007. The Bronx Terminal Market opened in 2009 as did the adjacent Mill Pond Park, which includes a Stadium Tennis Center.

In the 2000s, the New York City Department of Transportation started making capital, aesthetic, and safety improvements to the Grand Concourse with much of the work completed within the Concourse neighborhood. A redesign of 161st Street during the 2000 reconstruction of the Grand Concourse brought additional pedestrian space to the neighborhood. In 2011, the New York City Landmarks Preservation Commission designated a large portion of the neighborhood as the Grand Concourse Historic District.

In 2016, the New York City Economic Development Corporation issued requests for proposals for a new redevelopment project in the Concourse, along the Harlem River shore. A $300 million proposal, announced in September 2017, includes 1,045 affordable housing units as well as a new Universal Hip Hop Museum that is to open in 2020. The first of two phases will have 600 affordable unites, a 2.3-acre (0.93 ha) waterfront promenade, a public plaza, a performance space, a movie theater, and the hip hop museum.

== Demographics ==
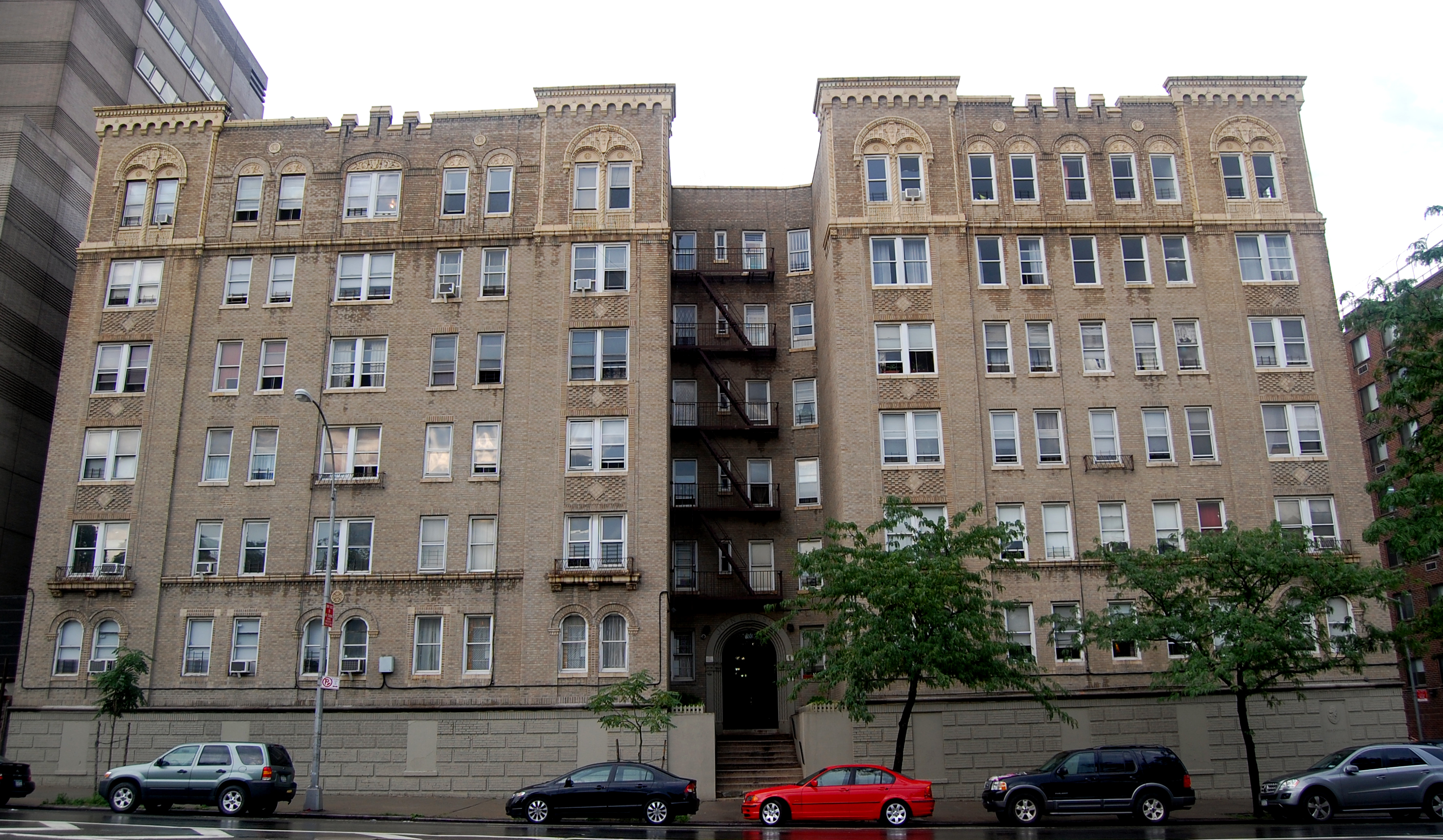
1100 Grand Concourse

Concourse is divided into two neighborhood tabulation areas, East Concourse/Concourse Village and West Concourse, which collectively comprise the population of Concourse. Based on data from the 2010 United States census, the combined population of Concourse was 101,566, a change of 3,048 (3%) from the 98,518 counted in 2000. Covering an area of 855.37 acres (346.16 ha), the neighborhood had a population density of 118.7 inhabitants per acre (76,000/sq mi; 29,300/km^{2}).

The racial makeup of the neighborhood was 1.6% (1,635) White, 32.7% (33,176) African American, 0.2% (219) Native American, 1.8% (1,836) Asian, 0% (24) Pacific Islander, 0.4% (447) from other races, and 1% (1,064) from two or more races. Hispanic or Latino of any race were 62.2% (63,165) of the population.

The area has become more middle class starting in the 2000s. In the 2010 census, there were 3,055 non-Hispanic White residents in the area around Concourse, having increased from 2,600 in the 2000 census. The 2010 census also marked the first time in 40 years where the Concourse neighborhood had seen a net increase in population.

The entirety of Community District 4, which comprises Concourse and Highbridge, had 155,835 inhabitants as of NYC Health's 2018 Community Health Profile, with an average life expectancy of 78.6 years. This is lower than the median life expectancy of 81.2 for all New York City neighborhoods. Most inhabitants are youth and middle-aged adults: 27% are between the ages of between 0–17, 29% between 25 and 44, and 23% between 45 and 64. The ratio of college-aged and elderly residents was lower, at 11% and 10% respectively.

As of 2017, the median household income in Community District 4 was $30,900. In 2018, an estimated 32% of Concourse and Highbridge residents lived in poverty, compared to 25% in all of the Bronx and 20% in all of New York City. One in eight residents (13%) were unemployed, compared to 13% in the Bronx and 9% in New York City. Rent burden, or the percentage of residents who have difficulty paying their rent, is 61% in Concourse and Highbridge, compared to the boroughwide and citywide rates of 58% and 51% respectively. Based on this calculation, as of 2018, Concourse and Highbridge are considered low-income relative to the rest of the city and not gentrifying.

== Police and crime ==
Concourse and Highbridge are patrolled by the 44th Precinct of the NYPD, located at 2 East 169th Street. The 44th Precinct ranked 39th safest out of 69 patrol areas for per-capita crime in 2010. As of 2018, with a non-fatal assault rate of 123 per 100,000 people, Concourse and Highbridge's rate of violent crimes per capita is greater than that of the city as a whole. The incarceration rate of 813 per 100,000 people is higher than that of the city as a whole.

The 44th Precinct has a lower crime rate than in the 1990s, with crimes across all categories having decreased by 77.3% between 1990 and 2022. The precinct reported 19 murders, 36 rapes, 713 robberies, 1,048 felony assaults, 421 burglaries, 934 grand larcenies, and 396 grand larcenies auto in 2022.

== Fire safety ==
Concourse is located near three New York City Fire Department (FDNY) fire stations. Engine Co. 71/Ladder Co. 55/Division 6 is located at 720 Melrose Avenue, Engine Co. 92/Ladder Co. 44/Battalion 17 is located at 1259 Morris Avenue, and Engine Co. 68/Ladder Co. 49 is located at 1160 Ogden Avenue.

In addition, FDNY EMS Station 17 is located at 1080 Ogden Avenue.

== Health ==
As of 2018, preterm births and births to teenage mothers are more common in Concourse and Highbridge than in other places citywide. In Concourse and Highbridge, there were 93 preterm births per 1,000 live births (compared to 87 per 1,000 citywide), and 34 births to teenage mothers per 1,000 live births (compared to 19.3 per 1,000 citywide). Concourse and Highbridge has a relatively average population of residents who are uninsured. In 2018, this population of uninsured residents was estimated to be 13%, slightly higher than the citywide rate of 12%.

The concentration of fine particulate matter, the deadliest type of air pollutant, in Concourse and Highbridge is 0.0083 milligrams per cubic metre (8.3×10^{−9} oz/ft^{3}), more than the city average. Fifteen percent of Concourse and Highbridge residents are smokers, which is higher than the city average of 14% of residents being smokers. In Concourse and Highbridge, 34% of residents are obese, 17% are diabetic, and 42% have high blood pressure—compared to the citywide averages of 24%, 11%, and 28% respectively. In addition, 23% of children are obese, compared to the citywide average of 20%.

Eighty-three percent of residents eat some fruits and vegetables every day, which is less than the city's average of 87%. In 2018, 72% of residents described their health as "good", "very good", or "excellent", lower than the city's average of 78%. For every supermarket in Concourse and Highbridge, there are 18 bodegas.

The nearest hospitals are NYC Health + Hospitals/Lincoln in Melrose and Bronx-Lebanon Hospital Center in Claremont.

=== Incidents ===
In 2017, several residents were sickened or killed due to a rare outbreak of leptospirosis. The cases were reported at 750 Grand Concourse, a building that had reported hundreds of health violations. In March 2020, during the coronavirus pandemic in New York City, a doorman at nearby 860 Grand Concourse was among the first people in New York City to die of COVID-19.

== Post offices and ZIP Codes ==
Concourse is covered by multiple ZIP Codes. While the area south of 161st Street is covered by 10451, the area to the north falls within 10452 (west of the Grand Concourse) and 10456 (east of the Grand Concourse). The United States Postal Service operates two post offices near Concourse: the Stadium Station at 901 Gerard Avenue, and the Highbridge Station at 1315 Inwood Avenue.

== Parks ==
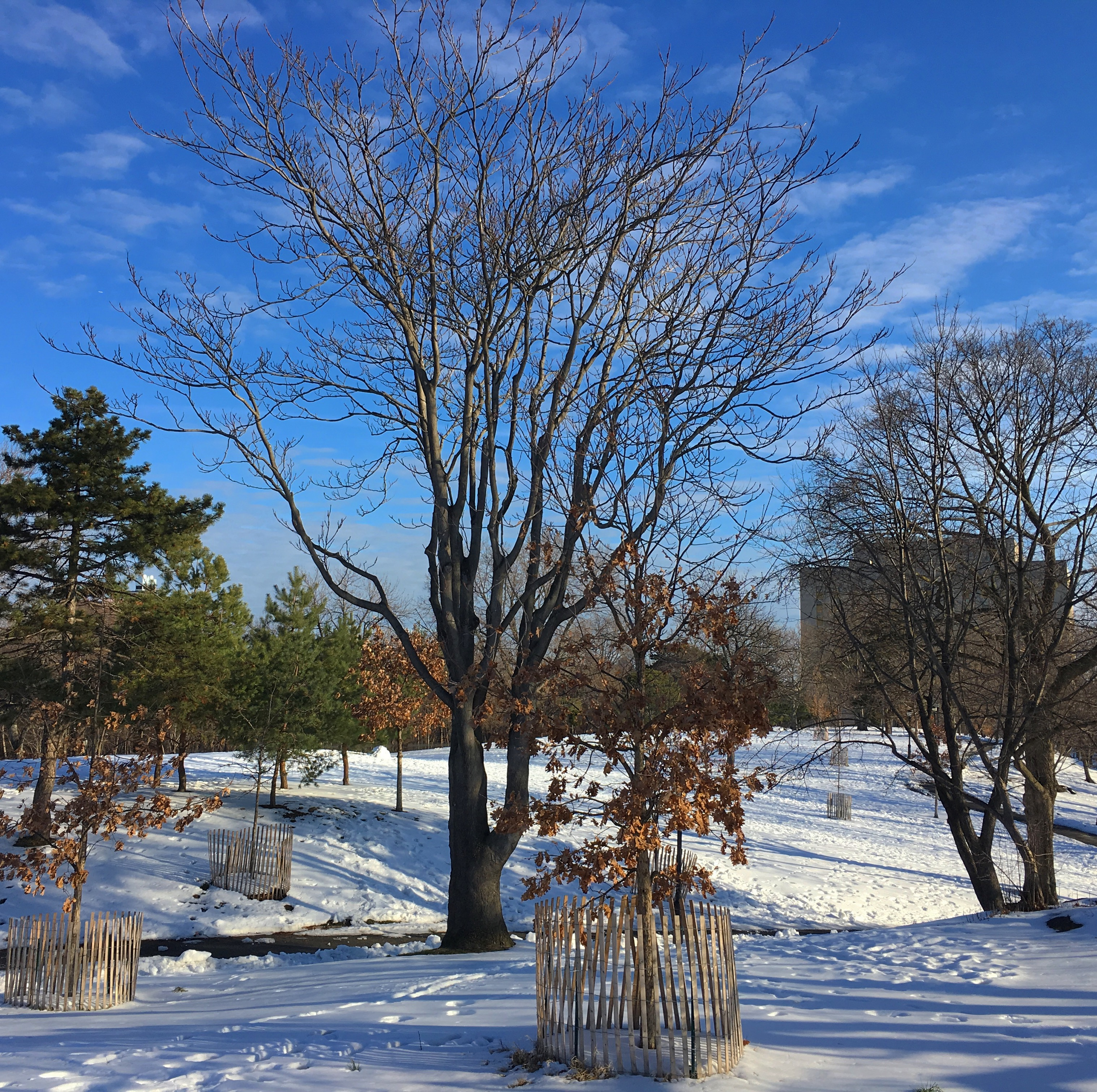
Franz Sigel Park

Concourse contains five separate parks and a plaza. At the center of the neighborhood and to the north of Bronx Courthouse, Joyce Kilmer Park and Lou Gehrig Plaza border the intersection of the Grand Concourse and 161st Street. Originally called Concourse Plaza, Joyce Kilmer Park was named for the author of the poem "Tree" in 1926. Joyce Kilmer Park contains the Lorelei Fountain which celebrates the German poet Heinrich Heine. The park is flat with many walking paths. To the south is Lou Gehrig Plaza, which bridges 161st Street between the Bronx Courthouse and Joyce Kilmer Park.

To the south of Bronx Courthouse, Franz Sigel Park offers a more rustic park space. Named for Franz Sigel, a patriot and educator in his native Germany and the United States who lived in the area until his death in 1902, the park is characterized by variations in elevation and bedrock. Formerly part of a Native American trail, a visitor can view Manhattan and surrounding rooftops from the terrace within the park. The park was extended in the 1960s to include a ball fields on the south side. A comfort area was added in 1993.

Mullaly Park, named for reporter and park advocate John Mullaly, is an active-use recreational space with a pool and a skate park.

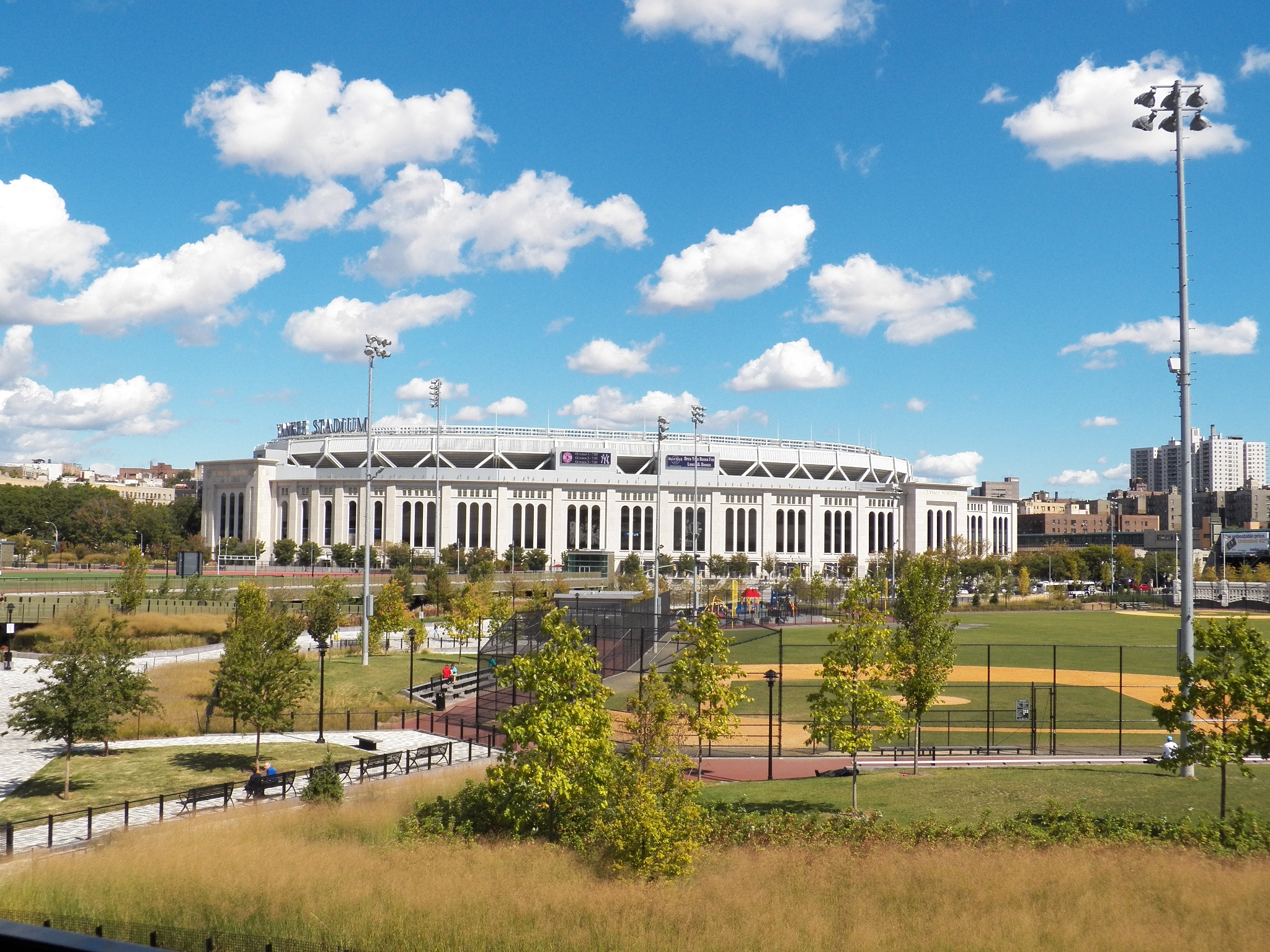
Macombs Dam Park

Expanded in 2009, Macombs Dam Park includes the 400-meter Joseph Yancy Track and Field, all weather turf, a soccer field, a baseball field, and grandstand seating for 600 people. The park, on the site of the original Yankee Stadium south of 161st Street and west of River Avenue, connects to the Yankees–East 153rd Street station on the Metro-North Railroad's Hudson Line.

Construction started on Mill Pond Park in 2006 and ended in 2009. Located between the Harlem River and River Avenue adjacent to Bronx Terminal Market, the Park features Stadium Tennis Center, walking paths, picnic areas, and views of the waterfront. The second floor of the Power house in Mill Pond Park is the future home of the Bronx Children's Museum.

== Education ==
Concourse and Highbridge generally have a lower rate of college-educated residents than the rest of the city as of 2018. While 36% of residents age 25 and older have a college education or higher, 43% have less than a high school education and 21% are high school graduates or have some college education. By contrast, 26% of Bronx residents and 43% of city residents have a college education or higher. The percentage of Concourse and Highbridge students excelling in math rose from 17% in 2000 to 40% in 2011, and reading achievement increased from 21% to 25% during the same time period.

Concourse and Highbridge's rate of elementary school student absenteeism is more than the rest of New York City. In Concourse and Highbridge, 28% of elementary school students missed twenty or more days per school year, higher than the citywide average of 20%. Additionally, 67% of high school students in Concourse and Highbridge graduate on time, lower than the citywide average of 75%.

=== Schools ===
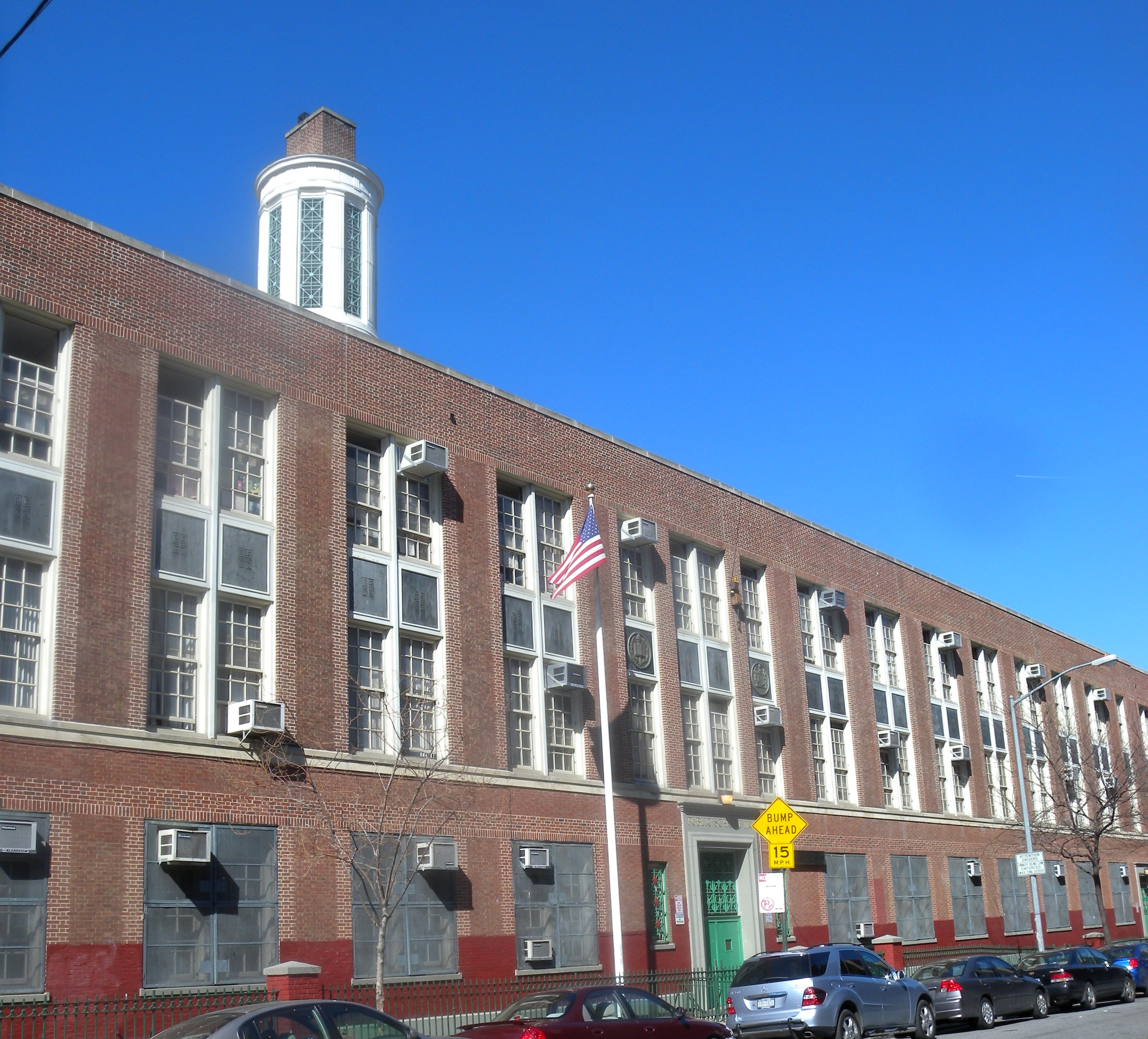
PS 114

Public schools are operated by the New York City Department of Education.

The following elementary schools are located in Concourse:

- PS/MS 31 The William Lloyd Garrison (grades PK-8)
- PS 35 Franz Siegel (grades K-5)
- PS 53 Basheer Quisim (grades PK-5)
- PS 64 Pura Belpre (grades 3–5)
- PS 70 Max Schoenfeld (grades K-5)
- PS 88 S Silverstein Little Sparrow School
- PS 114 Luis Lorens Torres School (grades K-5)
- PS 170 (grades K-2)
- PS/IS 218 Rafael Hernandez Dual Language Magnet School (grades K-8)
- Grant Avenue Elementary School (grades PK-5)
- Sheridan Academy for Young Leaders (grades K-5)
- The Family School (grades PK-5)
- Performance School (grades 4–5)

The following middle schools serve grades 6-8:

- Bronx Writing Academy
- JHS 145 Arturo Toscanini
- JHS 151 Lou Gehrig
- JHS 22 Jordan L Mott
- New Millennium Business Academy Middle School
- Science and Technology Academy A Mott Hall School
- Urban Science Academy

The following middle and high schools serve grades 6-12:

- Bronx Early College Academy For Teaching And Learn
- Bronx High School for Medical Science
- Bronx School For Law Government And Justice
- Eagle Academy for Young Men

The following high schools serve grades 9-12 unless otherwise indicated:

- Bronx Collegiate Academy
- Bronx High School of Business
- Dreamyard Preparatory School
- Jonathan Levin High School of Media and Communications (grades 11–12)

=== Libraries ===
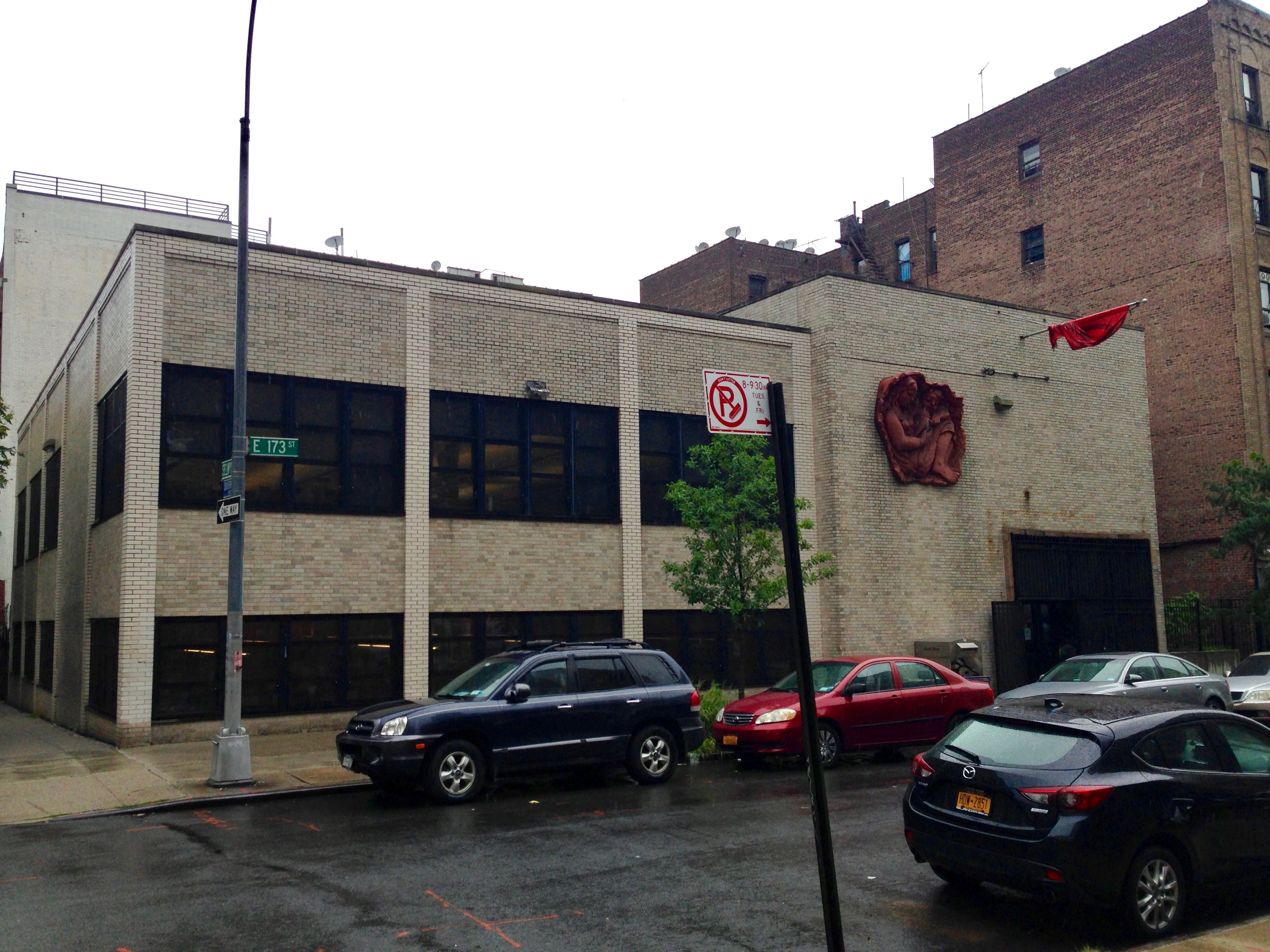
New York Public Library, Grand Concourse branch

The New York Public Library (NYPL) operates three branches in the Concourse area:

- The Grand Concourse branch is located at 155 East 173rd Street. The branch is a two-story structure that opened in 1959.
- The High Bridge branch is located at 78 West 168th Street. The branch was opened in the early 20th century and was renovated in 2010.
- The Melrose branch is located at 910 Morris Avenue. The branch, a two-story, 10,000-square-foot (930 m^{2}) Carnegie library, opened in 1914. It originally had four stories, but the top two floors were removed in a 1959 renovation.

== Transportation ==
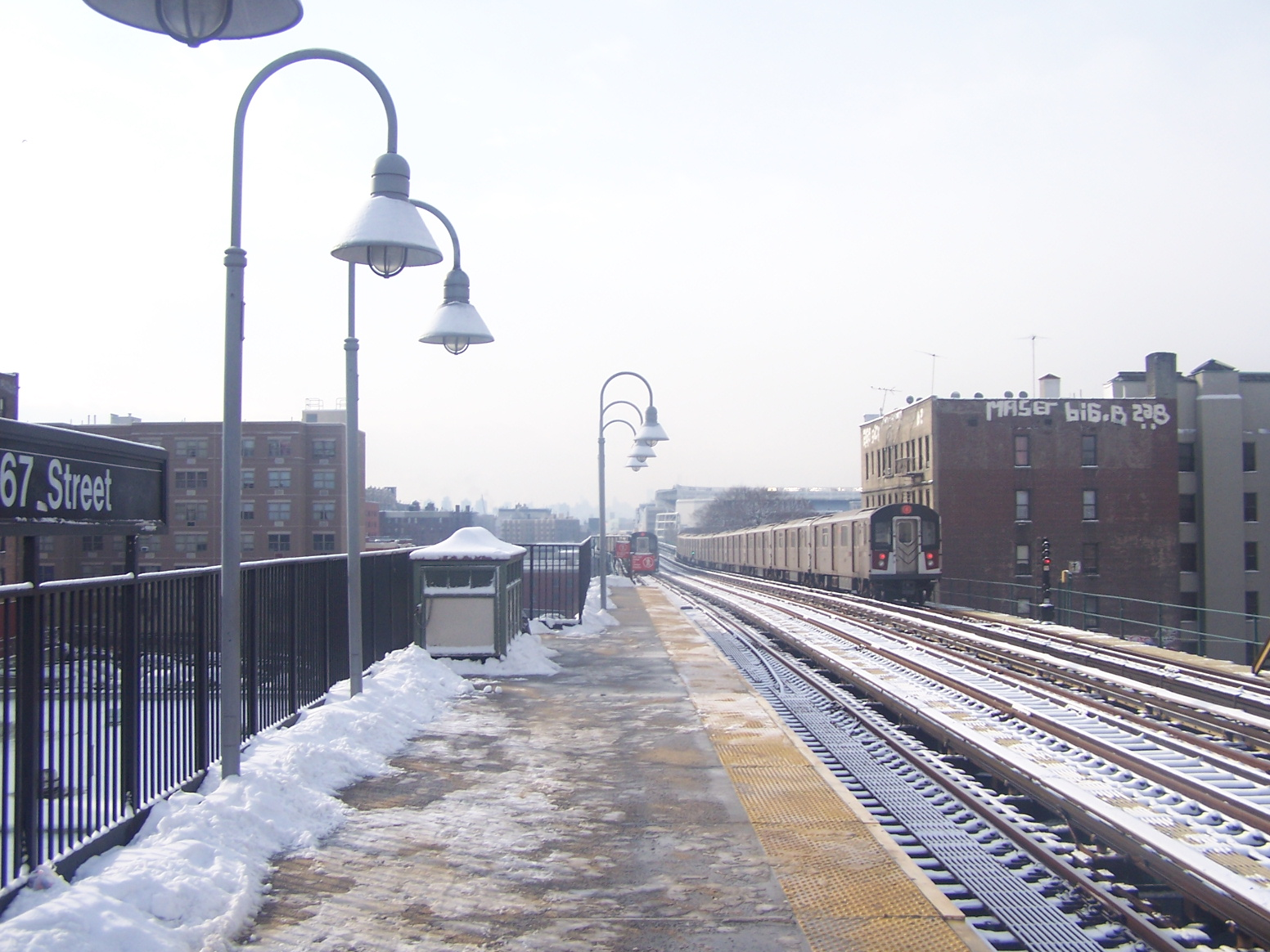
167th Street station on the IRT Jerome Avenue Line

The Harlem River separates the Bronx and Manhattan, with the Macombs Dam Bridge connecting the two boroughs within Concourse. Interstate 87, the Major Deegan Expressway, has exits that can access the neighborhood. The Grand Concourse terminates onto roads leading across the Triborough Bridge with connections to Queens and Manhattan.

New York City Subway routes include the IRT Jerome Avenue Line (4 train) at 161st Street and 167th Street, and the IND Concourse Line (B and D trains) at 161st Street and 167th Street. MTA Regional Bus Operations also operates several routes in the area:

- Bx1: to Riverdale or Third Avenue–138th Street station (6 and <6> trains) (via Grand Concourse)
- Bx2: to Kingsbridge Heights or Third Avenue–138th Street station (6 and <6> trains) (via Grand Concourse)
- Bx6 and Bx6 SBS: to Hunts Point or Riverside Drive (via 161st and 163rd Streets)
- Bx13: to Bronx Terminal Market, Boricua College, or George Washington Bridge Bus Terminal (via Ogden Avenue)
- Bx35: to Crotona Park East or George Washington Bridge Bus Terminal (via 167th Street)
- BxM4: express to Woodlawn Heights or Midtown Manhattan

The Metro-North Railroad's Harlem Line has a commuter rail station at Melrose as well as at Hudson Line's Yankees–East 153rd Street station.

== Points of interest ==
The neighborhood hosts a variety of institutions including:

- Andrew Freedman Home
- BronxWorks
- Bronx Museum of the Arts
- Bronx Courthouse
- Yankee Stadium
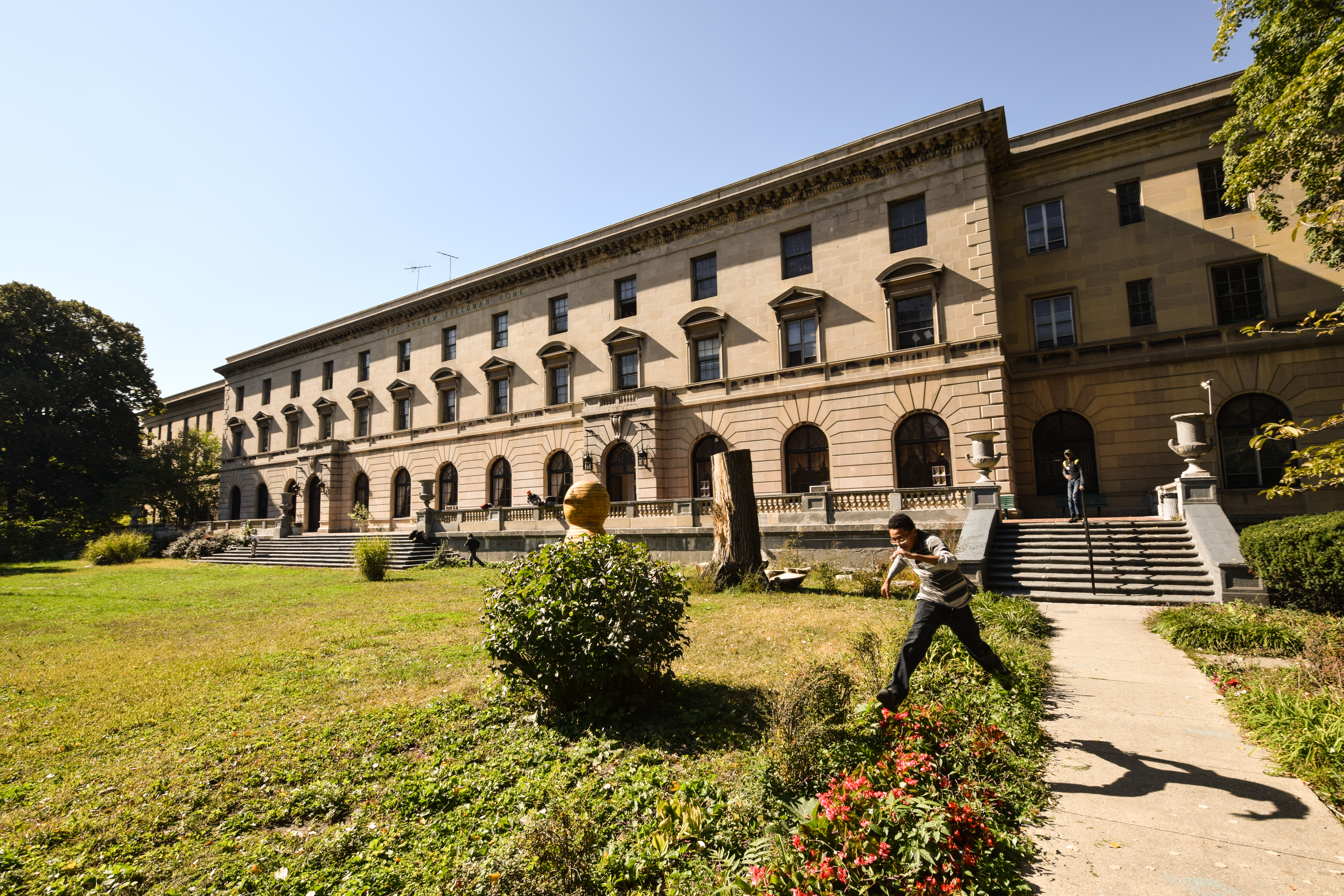
Andrew Freeman Home

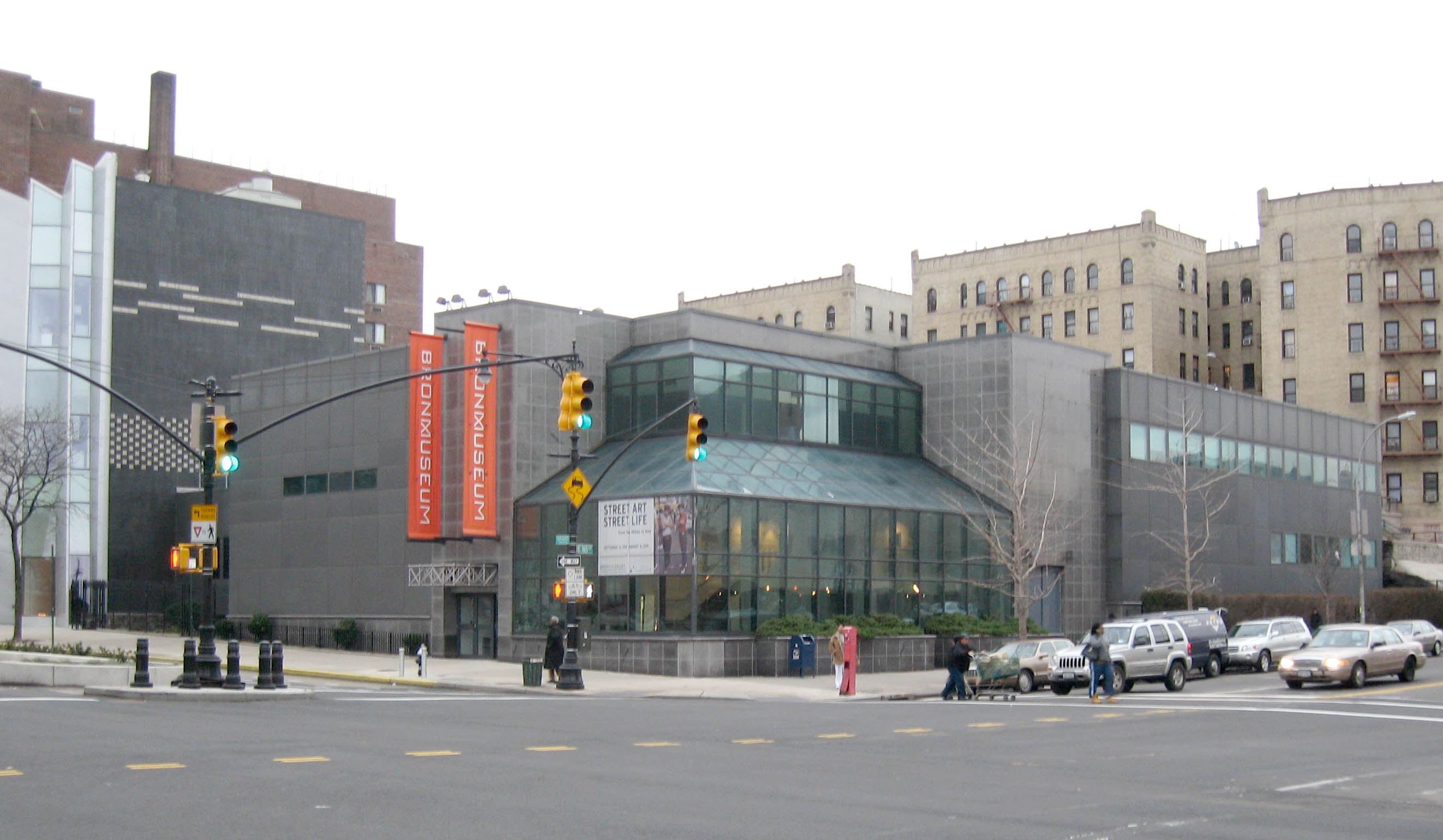
Bronx Museum of the Arts

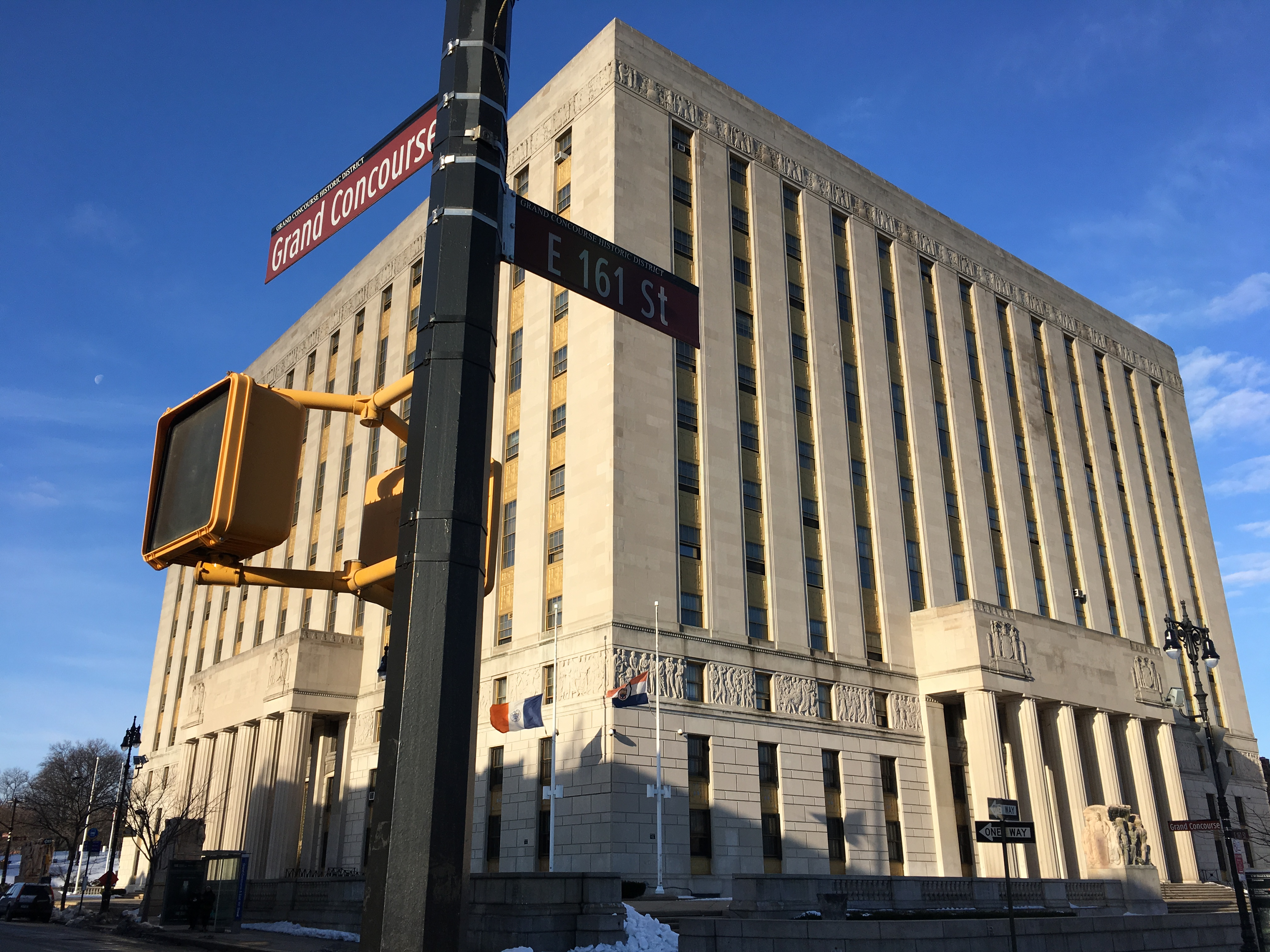
Bronx Courthouse at 161st and Grand Concourse

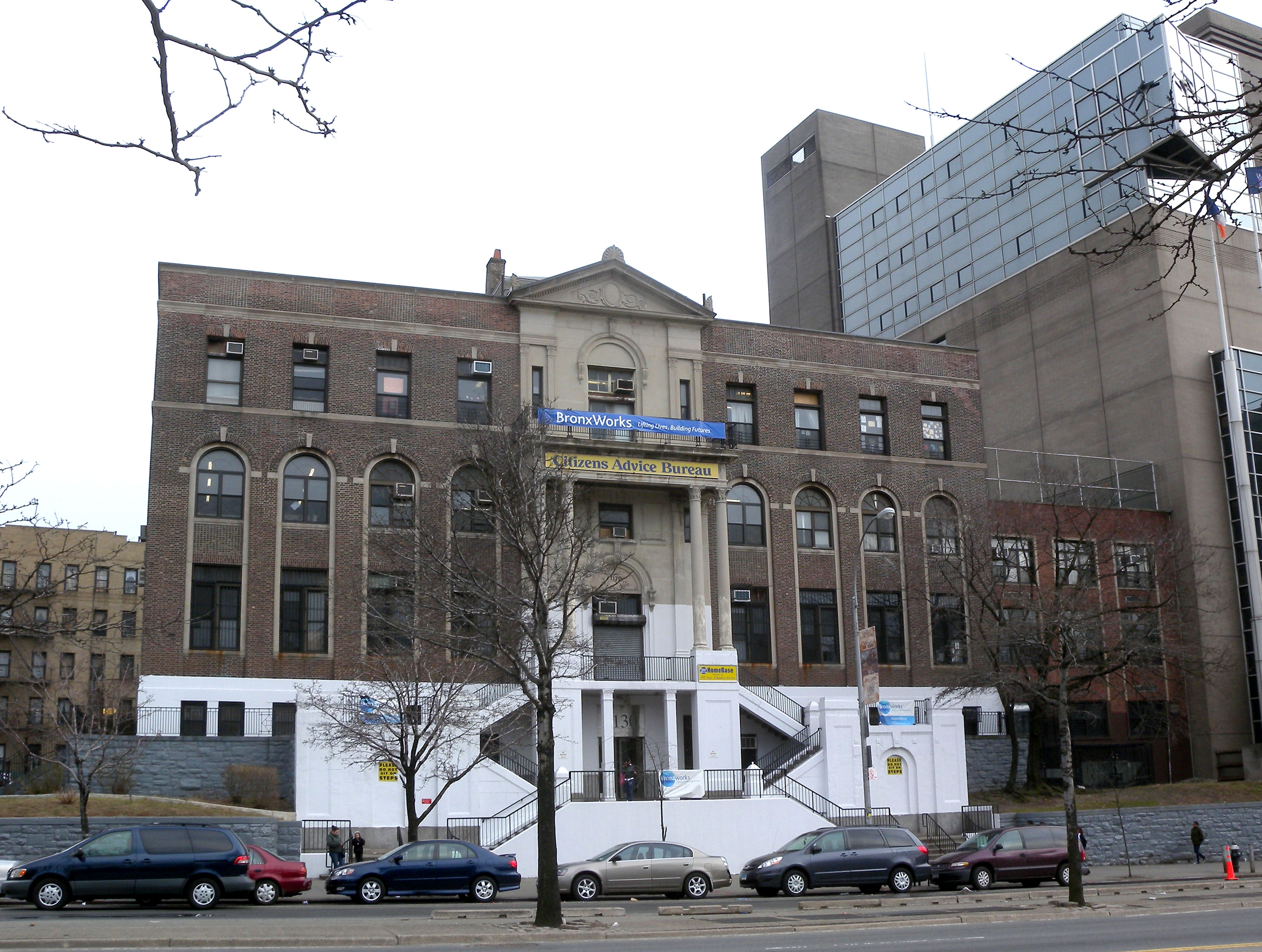
BronxWorks

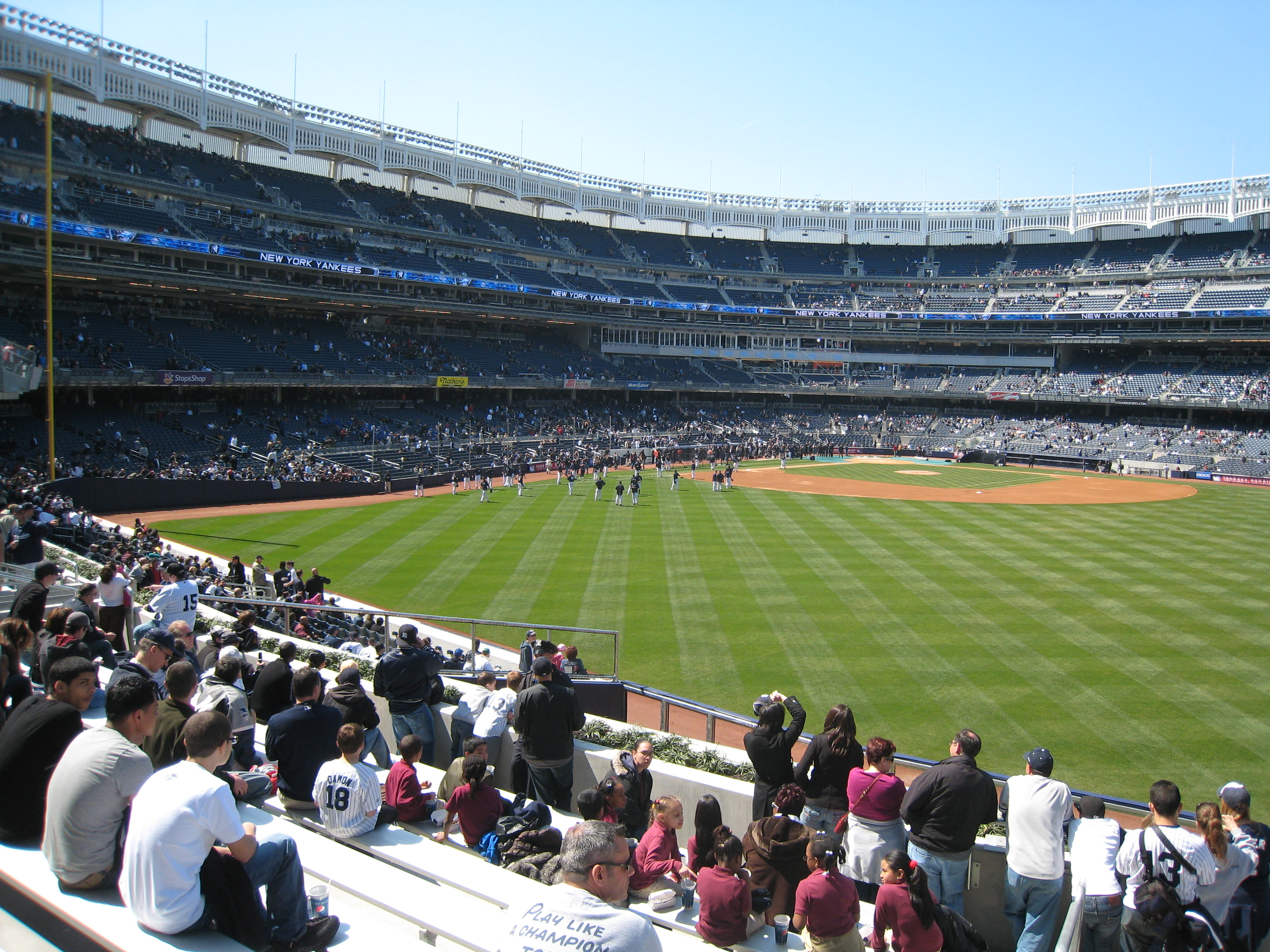
Yankee Stadium
