= Mill Pond Park =

Public park in the Bronx, New York

Coordinates: 40.821807°N 73.931293°W

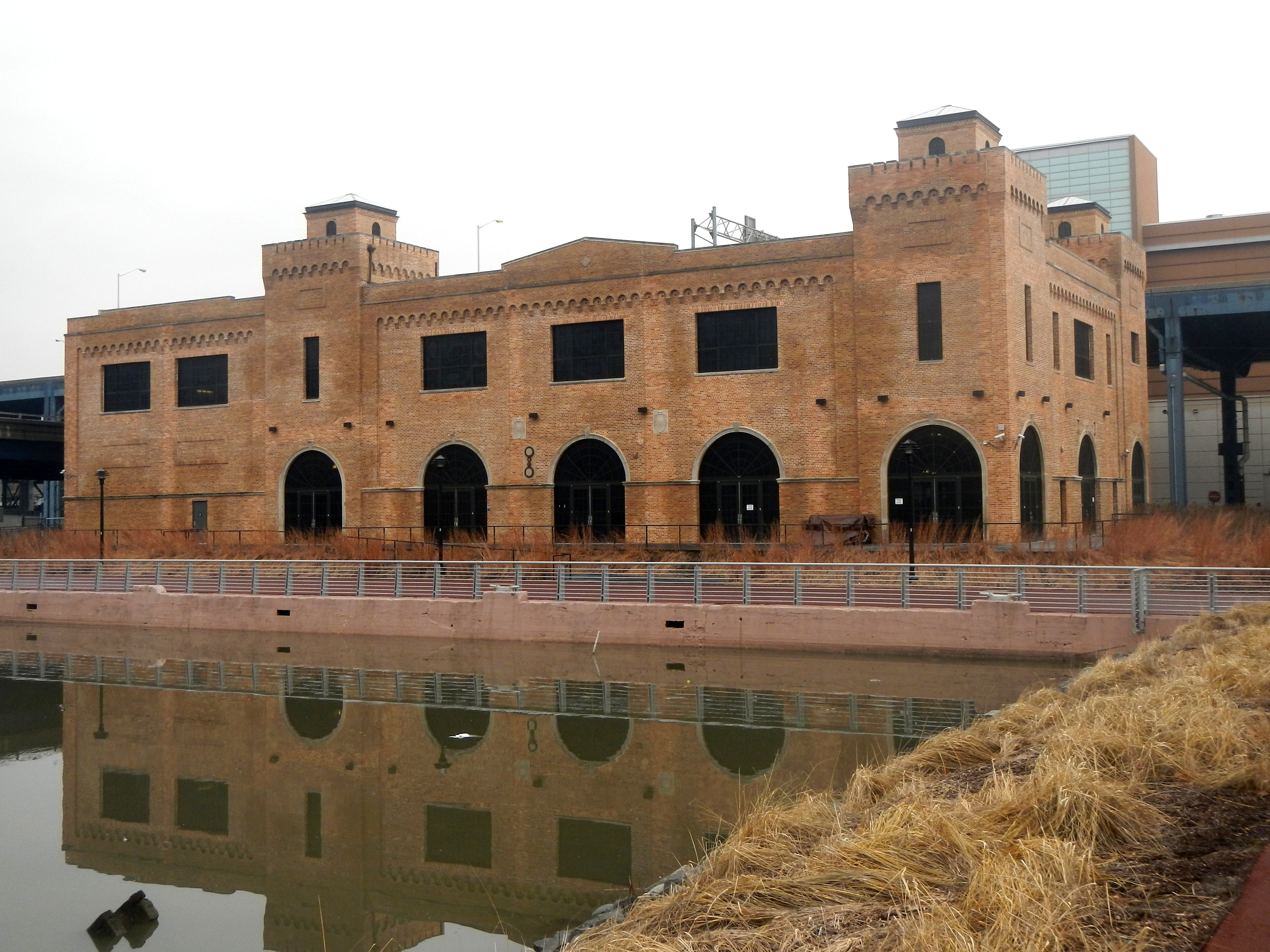
- The Power house at Mill Pond Park
- Interactive map of Mill Pond Park
- Type: Municipal park
- Location: Concourse, Bronx, New York City, U.S.
- Area: 11.57 acres (4.68 ha)
- Opened: 2009
- Owner: New York City Department of Parks and Recreation
- Status: Open all year
- Water: Harlem River
- Public transit: New York City Subway: at 161st Street – Yankee Stadium; New York City Subway: at 149th Street - Grand Concourse; New York City Bus: Bx1, Bx2, Bx6, Bx6 SBS, Bx13, Bx19; Metro-North Railroad: Hudson Line at Yankees – East 153rd Street
- Website: www.nycgovparks.org/parks/mill-pond-park

Mill Pond Park is a public park in the New York City borough of the Bronx. It was built to compensate for the loss of parkland resulting from the construction of new Yankee Stadium between 2006 and 2009. The park's name was inspired by a dam near the site of a creek that emptied into the Harlem River.

== Site ==
Known to the Lenape Native Americans as Mentipathe, Cromwell Creek originated in Morris Heights and flowed south towards Harlem River. Mullally Park and Macombs Dam Park were created in the late 19th century by filling in Cromwell Creek. The old Yankee Stadium was completed on the filled stream in 1923.

On the Harlem River, landowner Robert Macomb built a dam in 1813 to harness the flow of the stream. Macomb's Dam enabled only small boats to pass through a lock. By 1838 residents along the riverbank questioned the private usurpation of the public waterway and a campaign to remove Macomb's Dam succeeded in its demolition in 1858. The unpopular barrier was replaced with Macombs Dam Bridge, which connects 161st Street in the Bronx with 155th Street in Manhattan.

On the site of Mill Pond Park, Mayor John F. Hylan proposed a wholesale market to concentrate all farm produce entering the Bronx at one location. The project was completed in 1935 during the administration of mayor Fiorello H. LaGuardia. Along the Harlem River, railroad barges brought produce to the market, docking between four piers that were later incorporated into the park. The Oak Point Link railroad line still runs along the western shore of the park.

== Description ==
Mill Pond Park opened in 2009 and includes picnic and grass areas, an outdoor classroom, children's spray showers, a sand play area, two water channels, and a rehabilitated seawall. Mill Pond Park also includes 16 Deco Turf tennis courts that operate during the outdoor tennis season, from April through November. During the winter months, 12 courts are covered by a bubble. At the northern side of the park is the historic Power house, constructed in 1923 to provide refrigeration for Bronx Terminal Market. Retrofitted with a green rooftop, the energy efficient facility contains offices, public restrooms, indoor café, tennis clubhouse and locker room. The second floor of the power house is the home of the Bronx Children's Museum, which opened in December 2022.
