= Bronx Terminal Market =

Shopping mall in the Bronx, New York

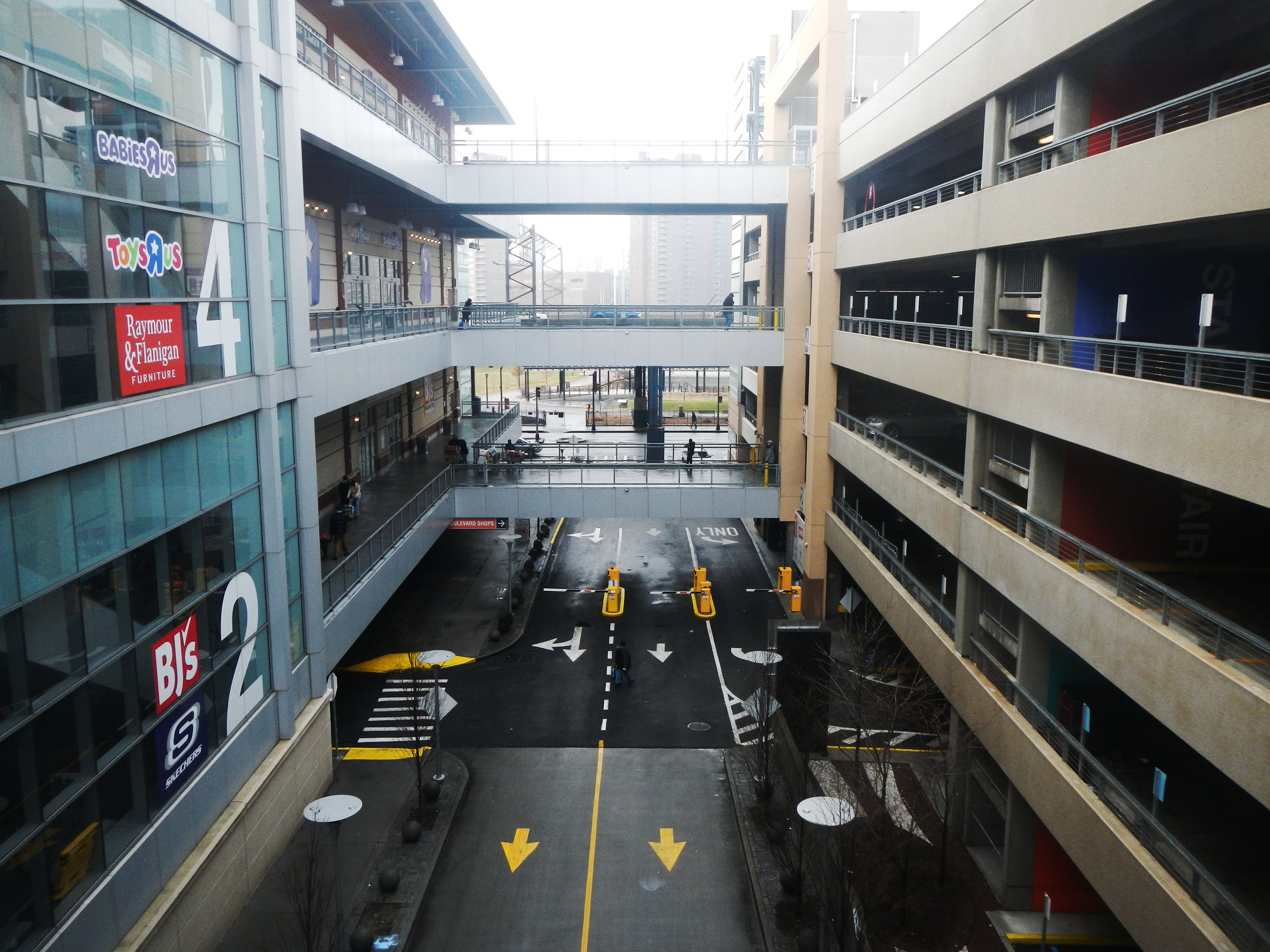
- Bronx Terminal Market
- Location: The Bronx, New York, United States
- Coordinates: 40.82037°N 73.930264°W
- Address: 610 Exterior Street
- Opened: May 1, 1935 (original); September 12, 2009 (current)
- Developer: BTM Development Partners
- Manager: The Related Companies
- Owner: The Related Companies
- Architect: GreenbergFarrow Architect, Brennan Beer Gorman/Architects
- Num. of stores: 28 (21 open, 7 vaccant)
- Num. of anchor tenants: 10 (8 open, 2 vacant)
- Floor area: 913,000 square feet (84,800 m^{2})
- Floors: 3 (North building), 4 (South building)
- Parking: 6-story, 2,600 car parking garage
- Website: bronxterminalmarket.com

Bronx Terminal Market, also known as Gateway Center at Bronx Terminal Market, is a shopping mall along the Major Deegan Expressway in Concourse, Bronx, New York. The center encompasses just under one million square feet of retail space built on a 17-acre (69,000 m^{2}) site that formerly held a wholesale fruit and vegetable market (also named the Bronx Terminal Market) as well as the former Bronx House of Detention for Men, south of Yankee Stadium.

The US$500 million shopping center, which was completed in 2009, saw the construction of new buildings and two smaller buildings, one new and the other a renovation of an existing building that was part of the original market. The two main buildings are linked by a six-level garage for 2,600 cars. The center's design has earned a Leadership in Energy and Environmental Design (LEED) Silver award.

== History ==
=== Early history ===
Bronx Terminal Market is just south of Yankee Stadium under the Major Deegan Expressway, on a wide road named Exterior Street. As early as 1914, Cyrus C. Miller, the former Bronx Borough President, had advocated the creation of a terminal market in New York City. Construction on the market started, but not completed until Fiorello La Guardia took office as mayor. During his tenure, he enacted a program constructing various markets to provide a home for the city's numerous pushcart vendors. Between October 1, 1934, and May 1, 1935, the city built a new complex just south of the existing unfinished structure. Bronx Terminal Market consisted of small two-story concrete buildings of simple design. Designed by Samuel A. Oxhandler with John D. Churchill and Albert W. Lewis, the buildings were originally painted light yellow. In 1936, the market's flagship structure went up, a small, cubist-style polygon at 149th Street with "Bronx Terminal Market" in large relief in the concrete. This building was designed to serve as a bank and, upstairs, a hotel for farmers. A car float brought in rail cars by barge to the market.

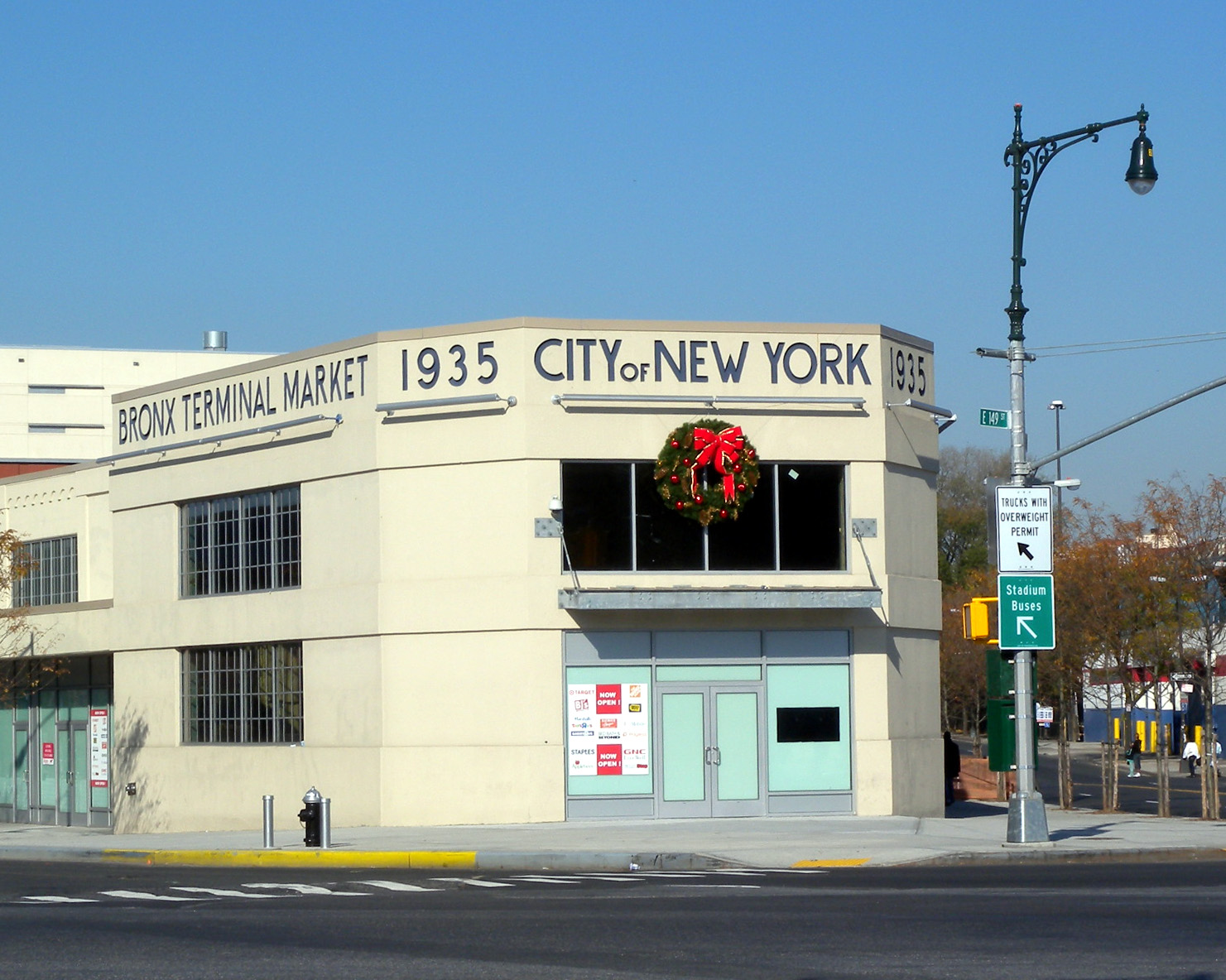
The renovated Prow Building, south end of the original Bronx Terminal Market

On December 21, 1935, La Guardia appeared at the market to proclaim a citywide ban on the sale, display, and possession of artichokes. The ban was instituted to combat the inflation of artichokes set by mobsters, namely Ciro Terranova. The ban was lifted within a year.

The market eventually grew to become the nation's largest wholesale market for Hispanic foods. The market went into steady decline and became a financial burden for the City in the late 1960s. When City began demolishing the market, however, Bronx Terminal Market Merchants Association approached developer David Buntzman for help to save it. Buntzman obtained a 99-year lease to the market in 1972 and operated it until 2004. In the market's heyday, it contained nearly 100 tenants and more than 1,000 employees. After a series of protracted legal battles with the City, Buntzman sold his interest to the Related Companies for $42.5 million in 2004.

=== As a mall ===
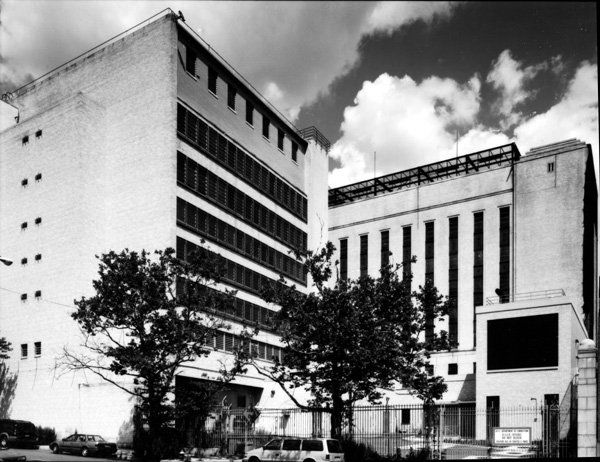
The former Bronx House of Detention

The nearby 350-cell Bronx County Jail, designed by Joseph Freedlander was built as a Works Progress Administration project and opened in 1937. Later known as the Bronx House of Detention, it was known for its elaborate art deco architectural details. It closed in 2000 and was later acquired by the Related Companies, who demolished it to make way for the new Bronx Terminal Market; some architectural details of the building were saved.

On August 14, 2006, construction began on Bronx Terminal Market, then known as Gateway Center at Bronx Terminal Market, which demolished all buildings on the acquired properties with the exception of the Prow Building, a 20,500-square-foot (1,900 m^{2}) building at the corner of East 149th Street, Exterior Street, and River Avenue. The center was approved after a Community Benefits Agreement was signed. The Home Depot was the first tenant/anchor to move in on April 23, 2009, the second tenant (and anchor) was BJ's which opened on August 1, and then the rest of the mall opened on September 12. The original tenants at the mall included several restaurants, a Chase bank, many stores taking up the third floor, and more anchor stores including Bed Bath & Beyond (its first and only store in the Bronx), Best Buy, BJ's, Marshalls, Raymour & Flanigan, Toys "R" Us (the first "R" Superstore in New York), Staples, and Target.

In September 2012, Staples announced that it would close 30 stores in the United States, including the Bronx Terminal Market location. It closed a year later. A StubHub location, at the Bronx Terminal Market, opened in July 2013 following a lawsuit that prevented them from opening a location near the Yankee Stadium due to the state's anti-scalping law.

Toys "R" Us closed as a part of the chain's liquidation in June 2018. In October 2018, it was announced that Food Bazaar was moving into the former Toys "R" Us at the Bronx Terminal Market. It was originally scheduled to open in Spring 2019, but instead opened in January 2020. It is the largest supermarket in the Bronx. In December 2019, a new universal hip hop museum, the Revolution of Hip Hop, opened at the Bronx Terminal Market. In January 2020, it was announced that Bed Bath & Beyond at the Bronx Terminal Market would be closing at the end of March 2020. The Related Companies refinanced the mall for $380 million in 2024.

== Anchors ==
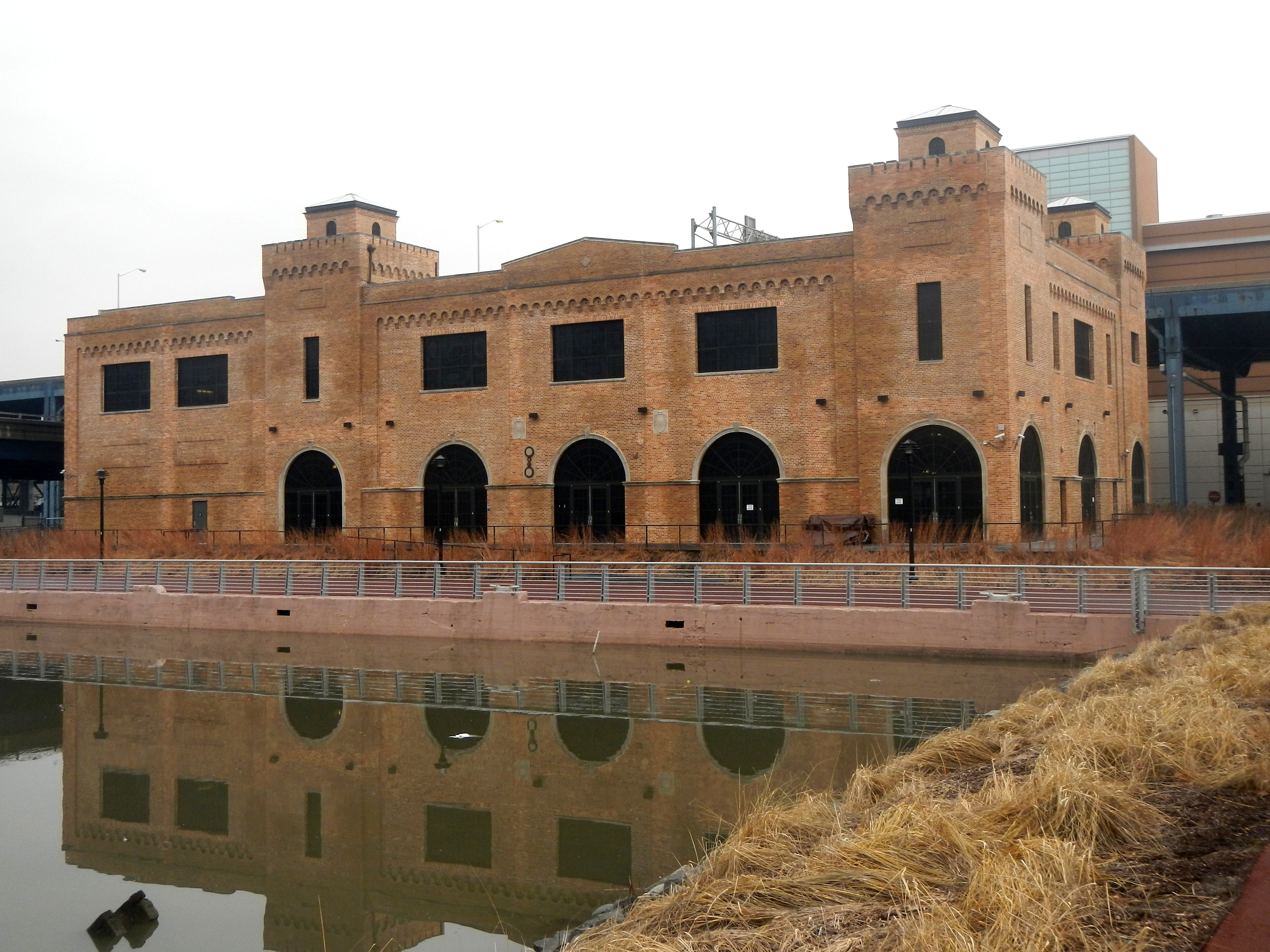
Former power house in nearby Mill Pond Park

=== Current ===
==== North building ====
- Target (190,000 sq ft (18,000 m^{2}))
- Burlington (74,329 sq ft (6,905.4 m^{2}))
- Lidl (40,000 sq ft (3,700 m^{2}))
- The Home Depot (131,000 sq ft (12,200 m^{2}))
- Dollar Discount (16,000 sq ft (1,500 m^{2}))

==== South building ====
- BJ's Wholesale Club (135,000 sq ft (12,500 m^{2}))
- Food Bazaar (77,000 sq ft (7,200 m^{2}))
- Raymour & Flanigan (50,000 sq ft (4,600 m^{2}))
- Vacant space (40,000 sq ft (3,700 m^{2}))
- Best Buy (55,000 sq ft (5,100 m^{2}))

=== Former ===
==== North Building ====
- Staples (16,000 sq ft (1,500 m^{2})), closed in 2013. Replaced by Dollar Discount in June 2015.
- Rainbow (74,329 sq ft (6,905.4 m^{2}), closed and replaced by Burlington in 2012.

==== South Building ====
- Bed Bath & Beyond (40,000 sq ft (3,700 m^{2})), closed in March 2020.
- Marshalls (40,000 sq ft (3,700 m^{2})), closed in January 2024.
- Toys "R" Us (77,000 sq ft (7,200 m^{2})), closed in June 2018. Replaced by Food Bazaar in January 2020.

== Transportation ==
Bronx Terminal Market is close to the New York City Subway's 149th Street–Grand Concourse station, served by the 2, 4, and 5 trains, and to the 161st Street–Yankee Stadium station, served by the 4, B, and D trains. The 145th Street station, served by the 3 train, is located in Manhattan just across the Harlem River. It is very close to the Metro-North Railroad's Yankees–East 153rd Street station, served by the Hudson Line. The Bx1, Bx2, Bx6, Bx6 SBS, Bx13 and Bx19 buses also stop nearby. The center is also accessible by car via exits 4, 5, and 6 on the Major Deegan Expressway.
