= Bronx museum =

Bronx museum or The Bronx museum may refer to:

- Bronx Children's Museum
- Bronx Museum of the Arts
- Museum of Bronx History
