= Bronx Children's Museum =

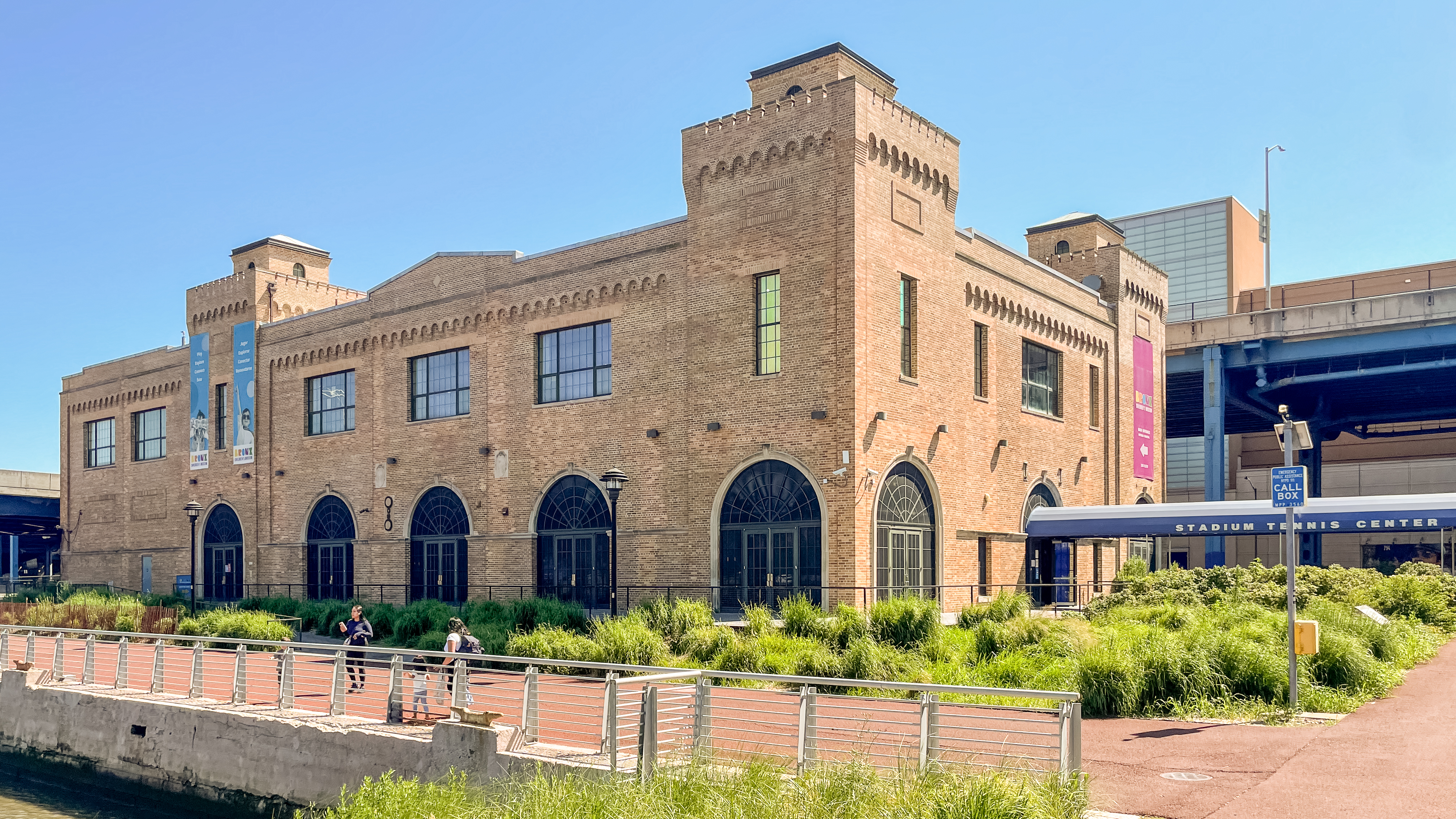
- The Power House at Mill Pond Park (2024)
- Established: 2005
- Location: Mill Pond Park, The Bronx, New York City
- Coordinates: 40°49′27.74″N 73°55′53.59″W
- Type: Children's museum
- Visitors: 18,000
- Executive director: Carla Precht
- President: Hope Harley
- Public transit access: New York City Subway: at 149th Street–Grand Concourse; New York City Bus: Bx1, Bx2, Bx19, Bx41, Bx41 SBS; Metro-North Railroad: Hudson Line at Yankees – East 153rd Street
- Website: bronxchildrensmuseum.org

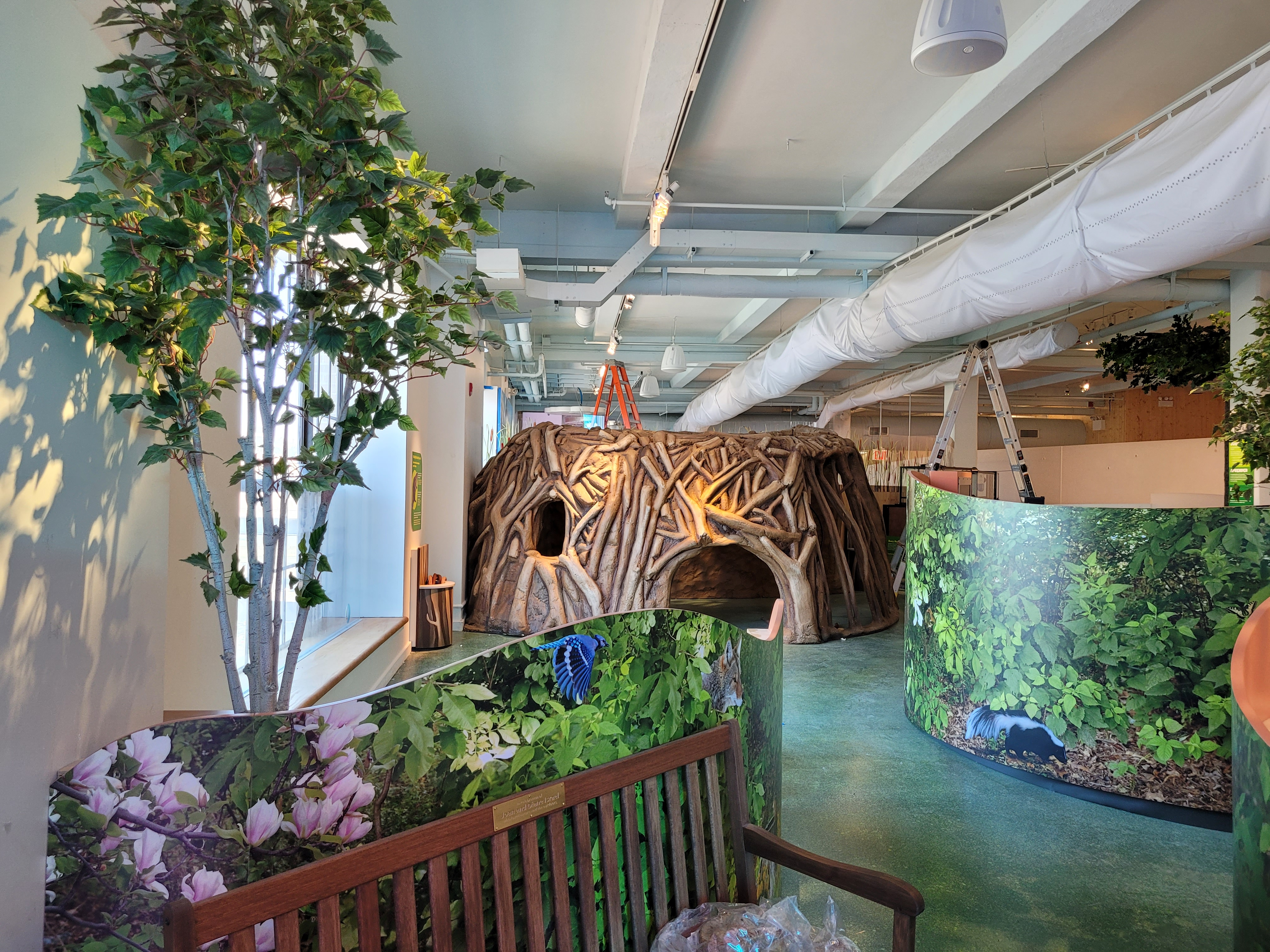
Beaver Lodge and Wood's location

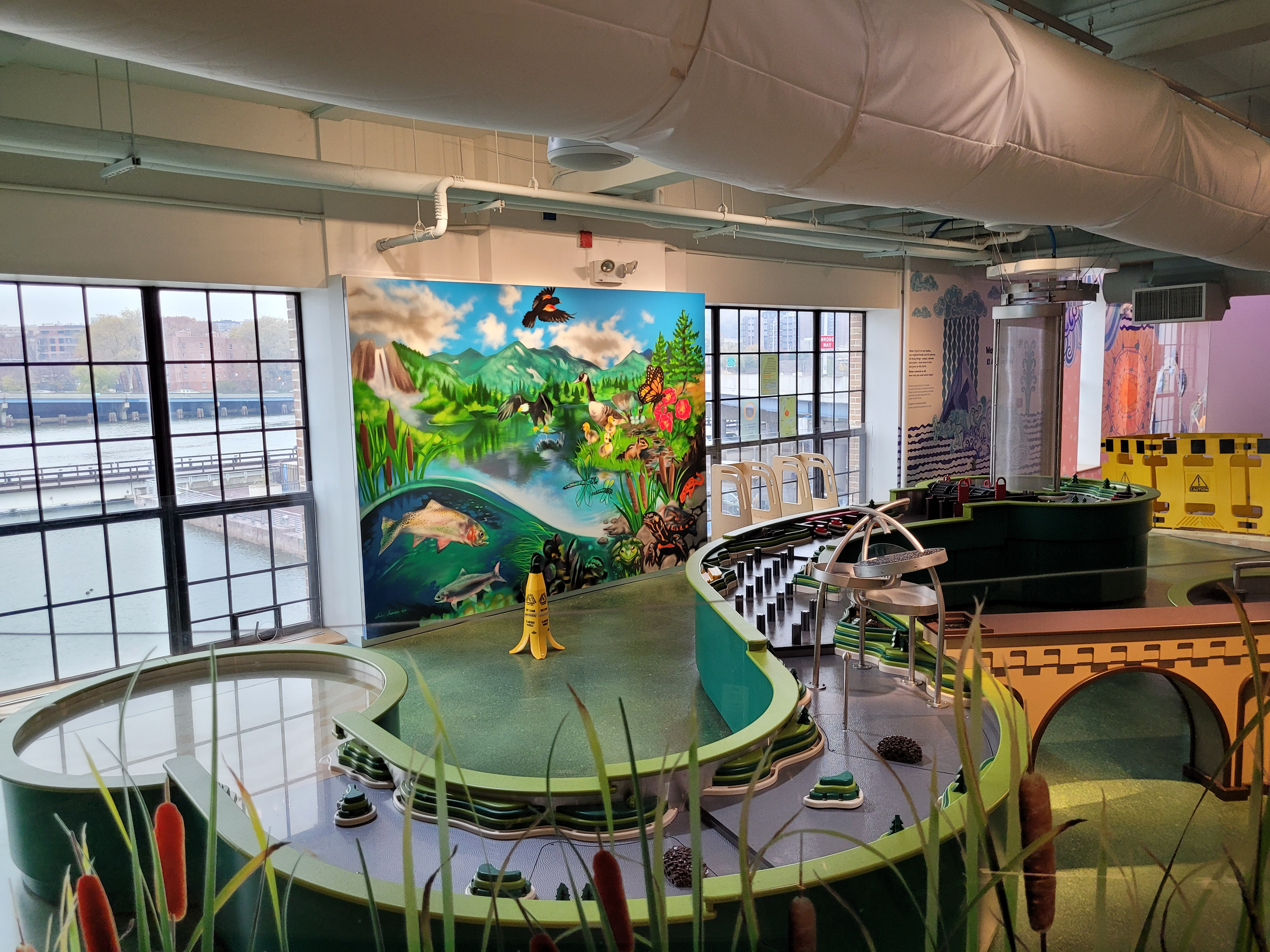
Exhibits

The Bronx Children's Museum is a children's museum founded in 2005. Its exhibition space is located in Mill Pond Park in the South Bronx, New York City. The Museum provides ongoing in-school, afterschool and summer enrichment programming throughout the borough at schools, community based organizations, shelters, libraries, local festivals and parks. Since 2011, the Museum has offered programming out of its Museum On The Go! bus, also known as the "purple bus". The museum reaches about 10,000 people per year through the purple bus.

Among the museum's supporters are Supreme Court Justice Sonia Sotomayor and former Sesame Street star Sonia Manzano, both regular participants of the museum's "Dream Big" summer program. Manzano has also written a children's book for the museum: The Lowdown on the High Bridge about the nearby High Bridge, which straddles the East River, and provided water to Manhattan from the old Croton Aqueduct. Other celebrities associated with the museum include Kerry Washington, and Chazz Palminteri, both honorees at the museum's annual galas, and Sunny Hostin, who serves on the museum's board of directors.

The groundbreaking ceremony for the exhibition space was held on July 12, 2017. The permanent building was opened to the public on December 3, 2022. It takes up the entire second floor of the Power House building.

In September 2025, the Bronx Children's Museum became part of the city's Cultural Institutions Group, a partnership of cultural and educational institutions.

== See also ==
- List of children’s museums in New York City
- Brooklyn Children's Museum
- Children's Library Discovery Center
- Children's Museum of Manhattan
- Children's Museum of the Arts
- Staten Island Children's Museum
