= BronxWorks =

Non-profit organization in New York City

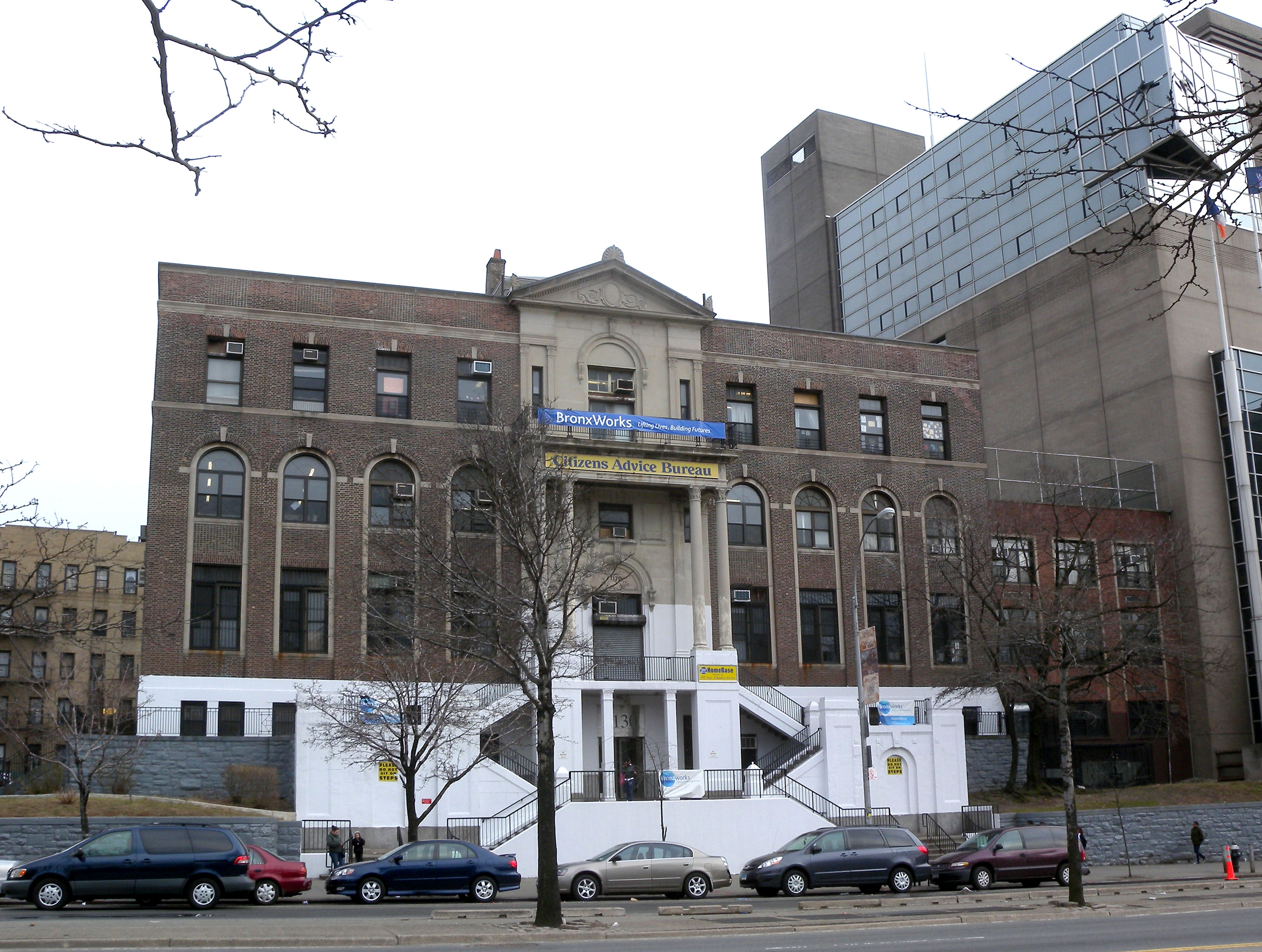
- Building at 1130 Grand Concourse
- Named after: The Bronx
- Formation: 1972; 54 years ago
- Founders: Mildred Zucker,
- Founded at: Morris Heights, Bronx
- Type: NGO
- Purpose: humanitarian, settlement house
- Headquarters: 60 East Tremont Avenue, Bronx, New York 10453, U.S.
- Region served: The Bronx
- Executive Director: Eileen Torres
- Affiliations: United Neighborhood Houses
- Website: www.bronxworks.org
- Formerly called: Citizens Advice Bureau

BronxWorks is a human service organization and settlement house based in the Bronx, New York City that was founded as Citizens Advice Bureau in the Morris Heights section in 1972. The founders, social worker Mildred Zucker of the Federation of Protestant Welfare Agencies and a group of local clergy, elected officials, and community advocates, initially modeled the organization on a similar agency in the United Kingdom, in which walk-in offices were established in every county to assist residents on queries about topics such as housing–related matters, consumer issues, and entitlements.

== History ==
Founded in 1972, BronxWorks’ initial focus was on working with seniors to resolve housing and entitlements issues. Throughout the 1970s, BronxWorks expanded its scope of services, creating the first minor home repair program for seniors in 1975.

In the 1980s, BronxWorks opened an office in the Bedford Park section of the north central Bronx in 1984, adding services for immigrants and securing city government funding for HIV/AIDS education and prevention services in 1988, and beginning work with the homeless in 1989. In the 1980s, they added three more walk-in offices in the Hunts Point neighborhood at Avenue St. John and one in the southwest Bronx at Townsend Avenue. An office was created to coordinate programs for seniors in the 1990s. Walk-in offices were opened in four South Bronx neighborhoods. HIV/AIDS services were expanded to include COBRA case management and SRO outreach. BronxWorks completed a merger with the Girls Club of New York in 1995, enabling the organization to secure a four-story, 38,000-square-foot (3,500 m^{2}) building.

BronxWorks joined United Neighborhood Houses (UNH), the umbrella organization for the city's settlement house system, in 1992. To prevent homelessness, BronxWorks established the Homeless Prevention Program in 1992. Since that time, it has helped more than 20,000 low-income Bronx families avoid homelessness. BronxWorks had assumed responsibility for three seniors’ centers by the end of the 1990s.

== Leadership ==
Eileen Torres was appointed the executive director on May 1, 2014. Torres served as interim executive director prior to the new appointment. She succeeded Carolyn McLaughlin who headed BronxWorks from 1979 to 2013.
