= Bronx County Hall of Justice =

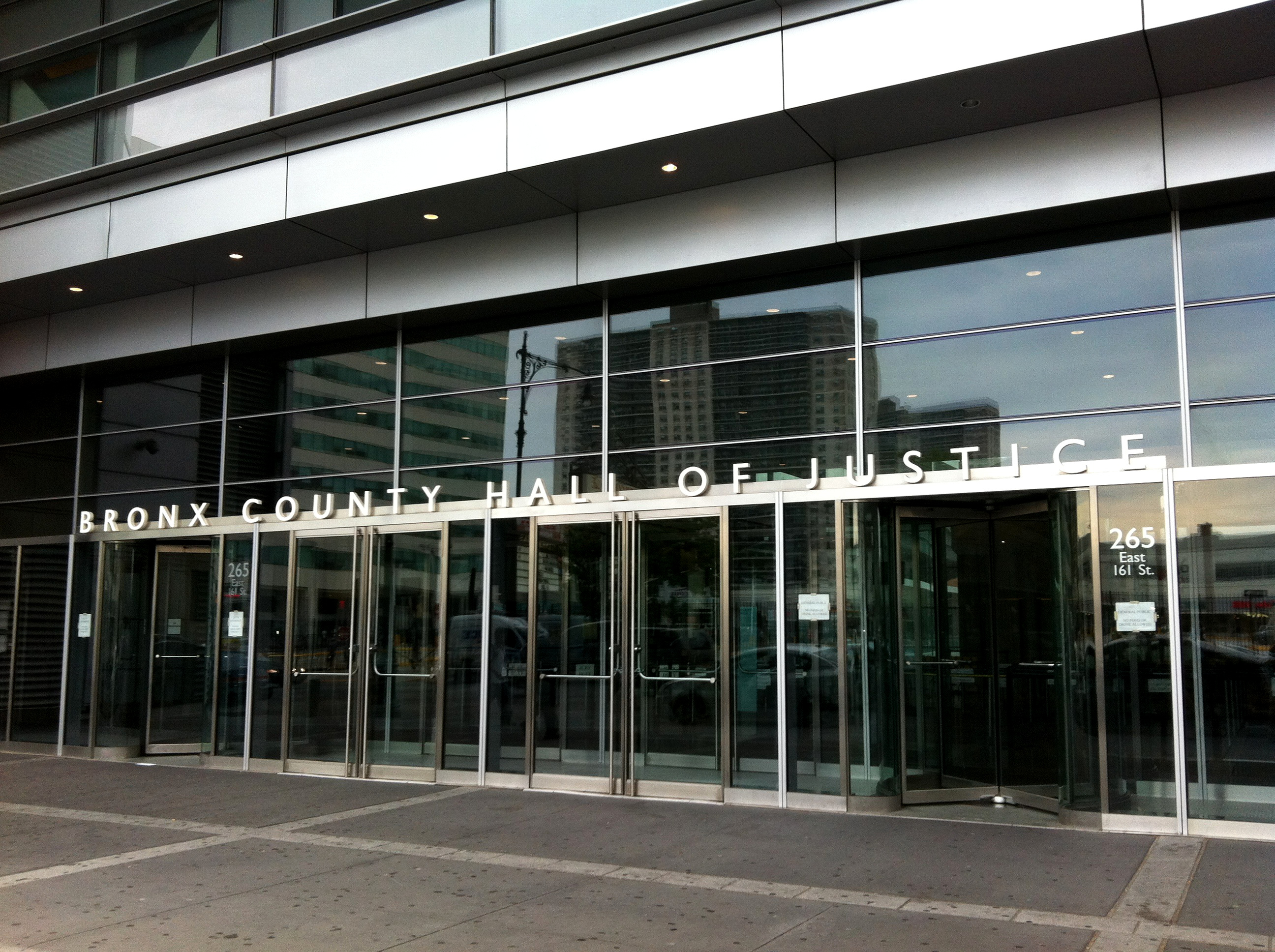
- Interactive map of the Bronx County Hall of Justice area

General information
- Location: 40°49′34.2″N 73°55′9.3″W, 265 East 161st Street, Bronx, New York City, United States
- Construction started: 2001
- Completed: 2008
- Cost: $421 million

Design and construction
- Architect: Rafael Viñoly

The Bronx County Hall of Justice is a courthouse at 265 East 161st Street, between Sherman and Morris Avenues in the Concourse section of the Bronx in New York City. The ten-story, 775,000-square-foot (72,000 m^{2}) building includes 47 New York Supreme Court and New York City Criminal Court courtrooms, 7 grand jury rooms, and office space for the New York City Department of Correction, the New York City Department of Probation, and the district attorney.

== Construction ==
The steel and glass building was designed by Rafael Viñoly. Construction began on August 14, 2001, with Mayor Rudolph Giuliani attending a breaking ground ceremony. Topping out was November 5, 2002. Sources differ on the completion date, variously stating 2006, 2007, or 2008. Originally planned as a four year construction job with a budget of $325 million, the project ended up taking six years and cost $421 million. The original contractor was suspected of having connections to organized crime and disqualified. There were problems with the underground parking garage, and the air conditioning system. Court officers complained that the courthouse was sinking, and it was temporarily shut down in 2009 as several windows cracked or broke due to the building settling.

The New York City capital commitment plan for fiscal year 2015 also included $35.3 million for post-construction work to repair and fix items that were not properly installed during the initial construction. The building nevertheless remains prone to window breaks, floor collapses, and flooding that closes the six basement courtrooms.

The building was originally designed to be 30 stories tall, including retail space. That design was discarded after the Alfred P. Murrah Federal Building was bombed in 1995. Other influences of the bombing include explosive-resistant glass, a bulletproof lobby, and locating the underground garage beneath the pedestrian plaza instead of the building itself.
