= Bx6 bus =

Bus route in New York City

bx6 bx6
- 155th/161st/163rd Streets/Hunts Point Avenue
- A 2015 XD40 (7129) on the Bx6 Local

Overview
- System: MTA Regional Bus Operations
- Operator: Manhattan and Bronx Surface Transit Operating Authority
- Garage: West Farms Depot
- Vehicle: New Flyer Xcelsior XN60 (main vehicle); Nova Bus LFS articulated New Flyer Xcelsior XD60 (local main; SBS supplemental); New Flyer C40LF New Flyer Xcelsior XN40 New Flyer Xcelsior XD40 Nova Bus LFS (supplemental)

Route
- Locale: Manhattan and The Bronx, New York, U.S.
- Landmarks served: Yankee Stadium, Bronx County Hall of Justice, Concourse Plaza, Hunts Point Cooperative Market
- Start: Washington Heights − Riverside Drive & 158th Street; 155th Street & Amsterdam Avenue (Bx6 overnight)
- Via: 155th Street, 161st Street, 163rd Street, Hunts Point Avenue, Food Center Drive
- End: Hunts Point – Hunts Point Cooperative Market
- Length: 6.2 miles (10.0 km) (Bx6 SBS); 6.4 miles (10.3 km) (Bx6)

Service
- Operates: 24 hours (Bx6); All times except late nights (Bx6 SBS)
- Ridership: 3,093,740 (2025)
- Transfers: Yes
- Timetable: Bx6 Bx6-SBS

The Bx6 is a public transit line in New York City running along the 163rd Street Crosstown Line, within the boroughs of Manhattan and the Bronx.

In 1948, the streetcar route was converted into a bus route, operated by the New York City Transit Authority under the subsidiary Manhattan and Bronx Surface Transit Operating Authority (MaBSTOA), and initially designated as the Bx34. During the late 20th century, the Bx34 and another bus route named the Bx15A would be both renumbered the Bx6. The bus line became the third bus rapid transit route to enter service in the Bronx in 2017, when the Bx6 Select Bus Service (SBS) was split from the Bx6 Local. It carries around 25,000 riders daily.

== Route description ==
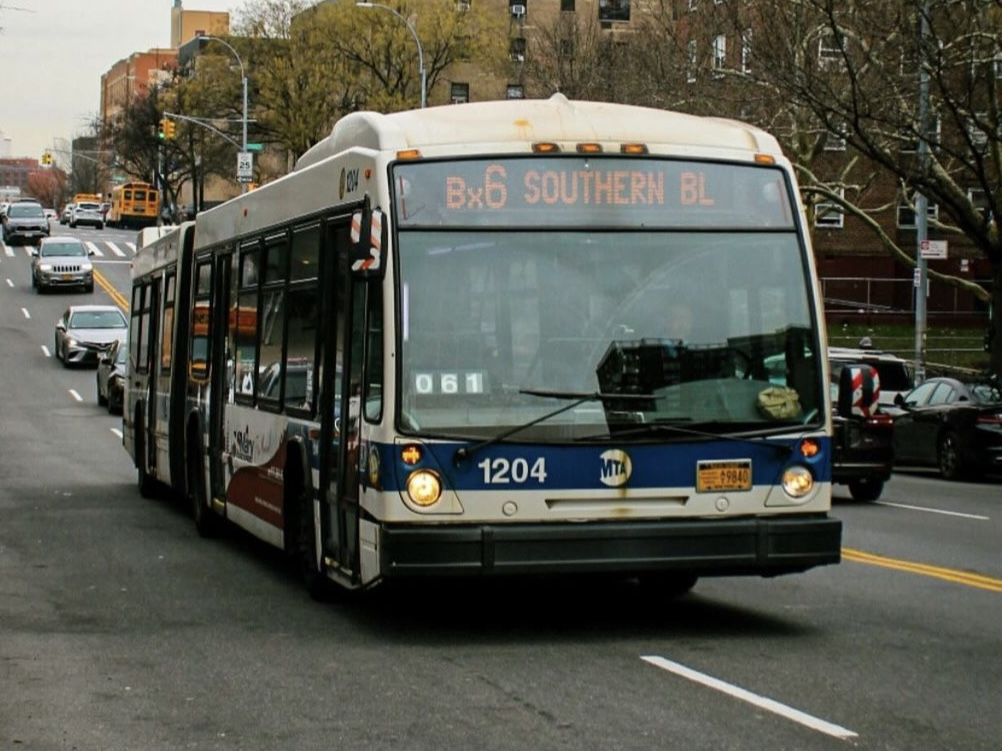
A 2010 Nova Bus LFS Articulated (1204) on the Bx6 local, set to short-turn at Southern Boulevard

The Bx6 begins at Riverside Drive West and West 158th Street in the Audubon Park section of Washington Heights, Manhattan. It uses Riverside Drive to access Broadway and then West 155th Street, while buses heading to the terminus use West 157th Street and Riverside Drive West. Buses then continue on West 155th Street until it uses the Major Deegan Expressway service road and Jerome Avenue to access East 161st Street, while buses heading to Manhattan goes on West 155th Street from East 161st Street. It then continues on East 161st Street until it turns to Elton Avenue and then East 163rd Street, while buses heading to Manhattan use East 163rd Street and Washington Avenue to access Elton Avenue. It then continues on East 163rd Street until it turns to Rev J Polite, then East 163rd Street again, and goes on Hunts Point Avenue at Southern Boulevard, where some eastbound buses terminate. It then continues on the avenue for a length until it turns to Spofford Avenue and then Halleck Street, and uses the latter street and Food Center Drive to access the terminus at Hunts Point Cooperative Market, while buses heading to Manhattan uses Food Center Drive to access Halleck Street.

Both the Bx6 and Bx6 SBS operate out of the West Farms Depot.

=== Select Bus Service ===
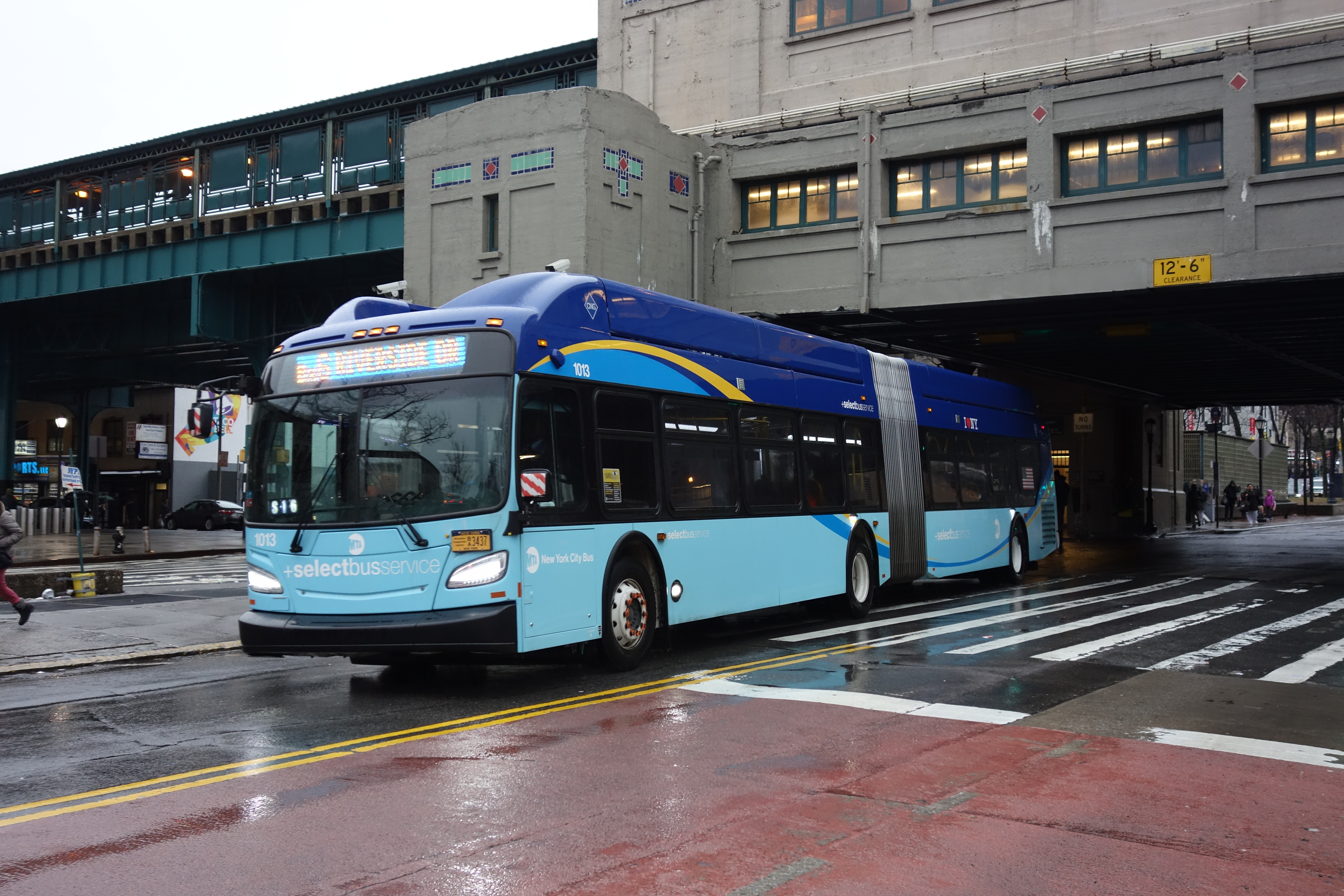

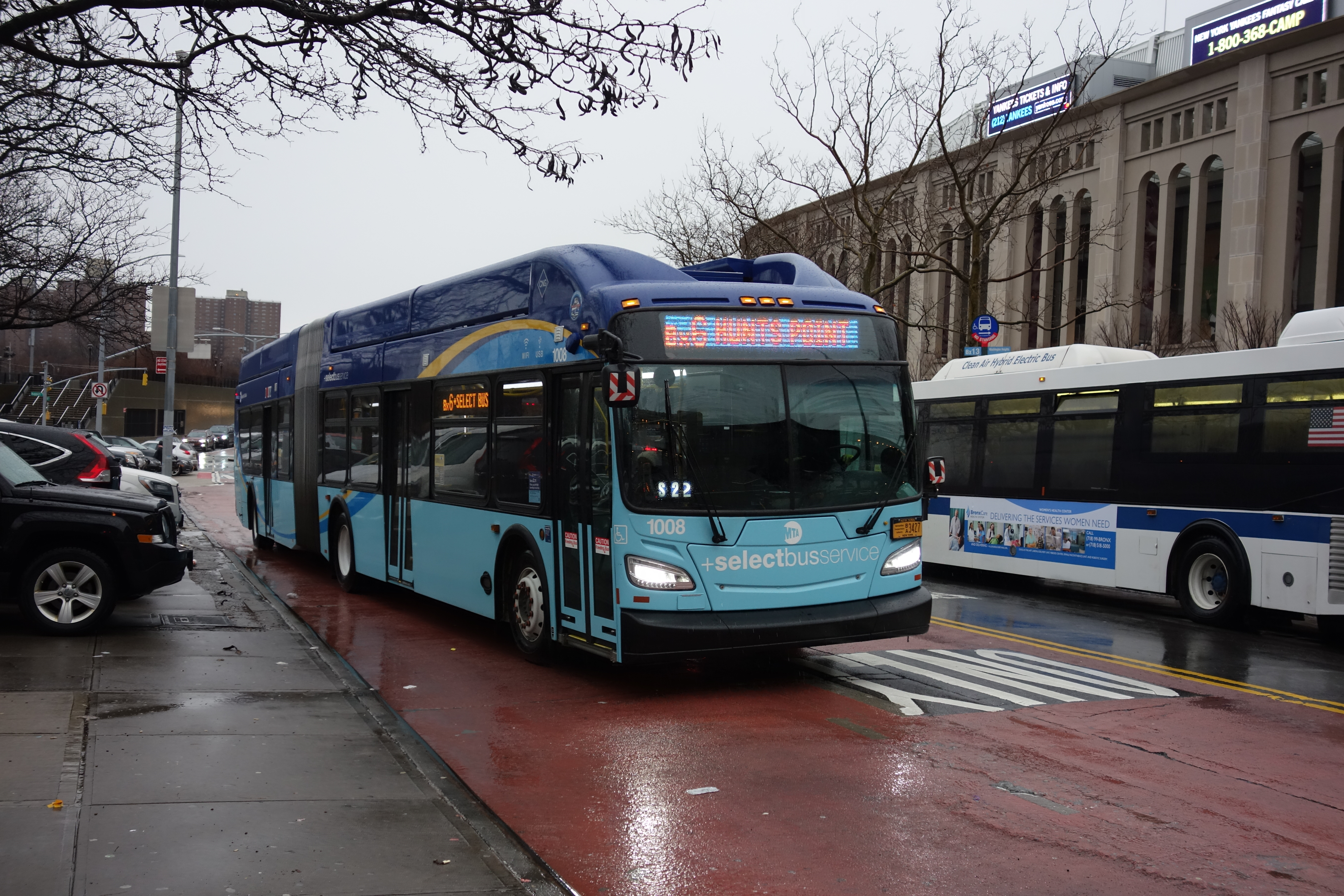
Two 2018 XN60s on the Bx6 SBS at 161st Street/River Avenue in January 2019: (1008) to Hunts Point (top), and (1013) to Riverside Drive (bottom)

The Bx6 also employs Select Bus Service, the third in the Bronx and the 15th one in the whole city overall. It runs the same route as the Bx6 local, except that the eastbound SBS route follows the westbound local route instead of exiting the Macombs Dam Bridge to Jerome Avenue.

The Bx6 Select Bus Service is the first official SBS route to use CNG buses. It also does not run late nights.

=== Select Bus Service stops ===
Station Street traveled	Direction	Connections
Manhattan
West 158th Street Riverside Drive	Westbound terminus, Eastbound station	NYC Bus: Bx6 Local
West 157th Street Edward M. Morgan Place	Eastbound	NYC Bus: M4, M5, Bx6 Local NYC Subway: train at 157th Street
Edward M. Morgan Place West 157th Street	Westbound	NYC Bus: M4, M5, Bx6 Local NYC Subway: train at 157th Street
Amsterdam Avenue West 155th Street	Bidirectional	NYC Bus: Bx6 Local, M3, M100, M101 NYC Subway: train at 155th Street
Macombs Dam Bridge
The Bronx
River Avenue East 161st Street	Bidirectional	NYC Bus: Bx6 Local, Bx13 NYC Subway: trains at 161st Street–Yankee Stadium Metro-North: Hudson Line at Yankees–East 153rd Street (three blocks south on East 153rd Street)
Sherman Avenue / Sheridan Avenue East 161st Street	Bidirectional	NYC Bus: Bx1, Bx2 (all buses at Grand Concourse), Bx6 Local, Bx13 (Weekday Mornings Only)
Melrose Avenue East 161st Street	Bidirectional	NYC Bus: Bx6 Local, Bx13 (Weekday Mornings Only), Bx41 Local, Bx41 SBS Metro-North: Harlem Line at Melrose (two blocks west on Park Avenue)
3rd Avenue East 163rd Street	Bidirectional	NYC Bus: Bx6 Local, Bx13 (Weekday Mornings Only), Bx15, Bx21
Prospect Avenue East 163rd Street	Bidirectional	NYC Bus: Bx6 Local, Bx17 NYC Subway: trains at Prospect Avenue (three blocks south on Westchester Avenue)
Intervale Avenue East 163rd Street	Bidirectional	NYC Bus: Bx4 (at Westchester Avenue), Bx6 Local NYC Subway: trains at Intervale Avenue (one block north on Westchester Avenue)
Southern Boulevard / Bruckner Boulevard Hunts Point Avenue	Bidirectional	NYC Bus: Bx5, Bx6 Local, Bx19 NYC Subway: trains at Hunts Point Avenue
Garrison Avenue / Seneca Avenue Hunts Point Avenue	Bidirectional	NYC Bus: Bx6 Local
Coster Street Hunts Point Avenue	Eastbound	NYC Bus: Bx6 Local
Spofford Avenue Hunts Point Avenue	Westbound	NYC Bus: Bx6 Local
Spofford Avenue Halleck Street	Bidirectional	NYC Bus: Bx6 Local
Food Center Drive Halleck Street	Bidirectional	NYC Bus: Bx6 Local, Bx46
Eastbound only
Viele Avenue Halleck Street	Eastbound	NYC Bus: Bx6 Local, Bx46
Ryawa Avenue Halleck Street	Eastbound	NYC Bus: Bx6 Local, Bx46
Farragut Street Food Center Drive	Eastbound	NYC Bus: Bx6 Local, Bx46
Hunts Point Market Food Center Drive	Eastbound	NYC Bus: Bx6 Local, Bx46
Baldor Food Center Drive	Eastbound	NYC Bus: Bx6 Local, Bx46
Westbound only
Market Street Food Center Drive	Eastbound Terminus; Westbound Station	NYC Bus: Bx6 Local, Bx46

== History ==
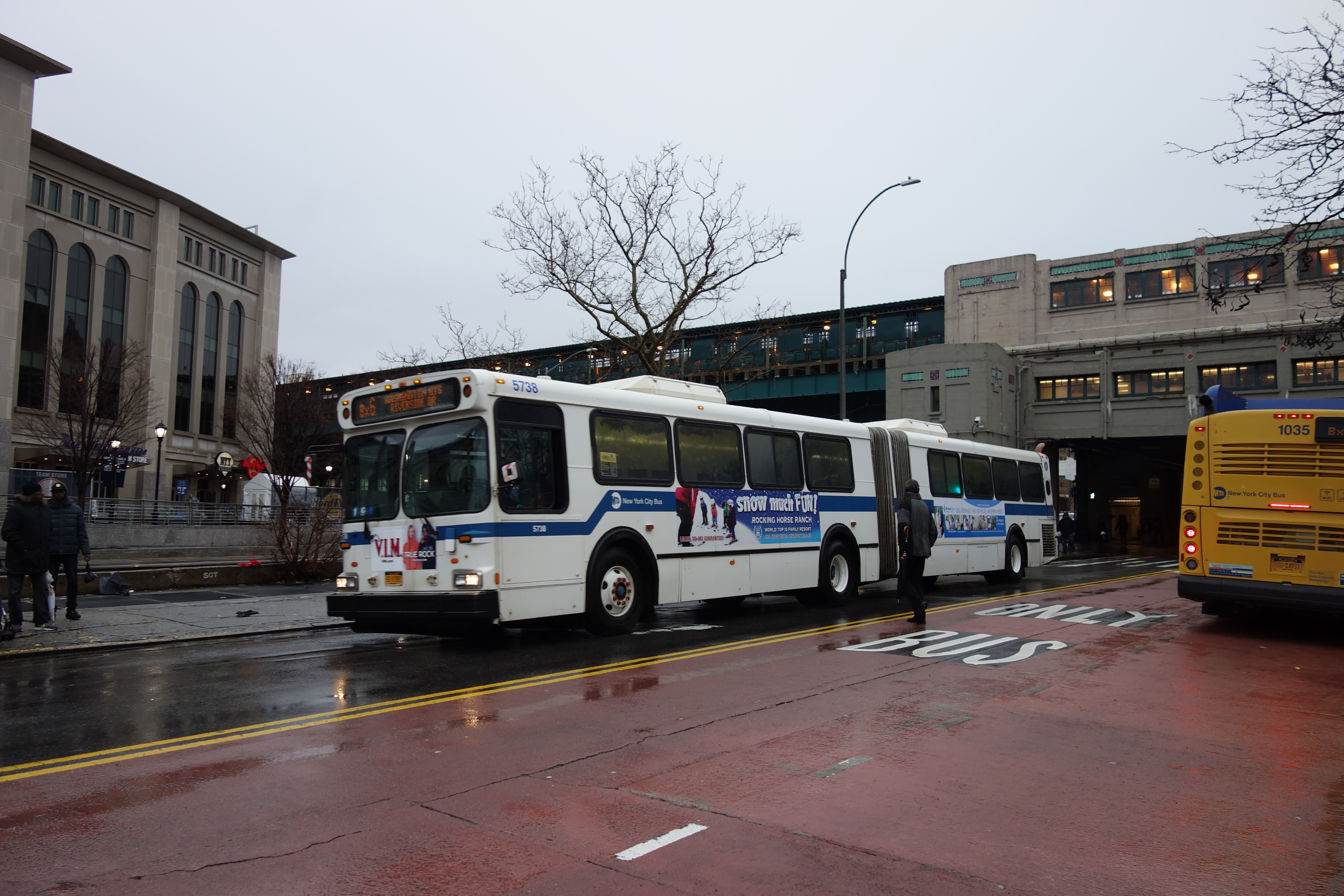
A 2003 D60HF (5738) on the Washington Heights-bound Bx6 at River Avenue/161st Street in January 2019

Buses replaced 163rd Street Crosstown Line streetcars on October 25, 1947, operating as the Bx34.

In Fiscal Year 1963, this route was extended to directly serve industrial areas.

On February 14, 1965, the route was extended on mile from 155th Street and St. Nicholas Avenue to Riverside Drive and 157th Street via 155 Street, Broadway, and 157th Street.

The original southern terminus was at Halleck Street-East Bay Avenue. Service was partially extended to East Bay Avenue-Hunts Point Avenue in November 1967, and then to its current terminus in July 1974. It replaced the Bx15A on the same year, which ran between Norwood and Baychester.

On February 19, 1984, the entire Bronx bus system was revamped, with several routes renumbered, merged or eliminated. As part of the changes, the Bx34 was renumbered to the Bx6.

The former Bx34A rush hour-only shuttle service, running only within the eastern and western areas of Hunts Point, became part of the Bx6 in February 1984. The western branch of Hunts Point was eliminated in 1990, and was not replaced by another service until the Barreto Pool Shuttle (current Bx46) started serving the area in July 2008.

=== Select Bus Service ===
On September 3, 2017, the Bx6 SBS service was split from the existing Bx6 local service. The Bx6 SBS initially operated a similar route to the local, but the eastbound SBS route followed the westbound local route instead of exiting the Macombs Dam Bridge to Jerome Avenue. The Bx6 SBS supplements the existing Bx6 local service, making stops at select high-ridership locations and all transfers points to Metro-North and subways.

The Bx6 SBS is the third Bronx Bus line to have Select Bus Service and the first one since the Bx41 on June 30, 2013. It is also the MTA's 15th Select Bus Service line to date, and the first official SBS to run a full CNG Fleet (it was first used temporarily on the Bx12 SBS).

The Bx6 corridor is the first to use bus lanes in the median of the street at the E 161st Street/Sheridan-Sherman Avenues stops, as opposed to curbside or offset bus lanes. The median bus lanes supposedly speeds up traffic by going around double-parked cars. On July 1, 2018, the Bx6 SBS was converted to an articulated bus route. The Bx6 local followed with first appearances in December 2018, and was permanently converted a month later.

=== Bus redesign ===
As part of the MTA's 2017 Fast Forward Plan to speed up mass transit service, a draft plan for a reorganization of Bronx bus routes was proposed in draft format in June 2019, with a final version published in October 2019. The plan included rerouting the Bx6 Select Bus Service along Bruckner Boulevard, Bronx River Avenue, and Story Avenue to a new east end at Turnbull and Pugsley Avenues, along the path of the Bx5 route. However, the Bx6 Local would have increased service south of Hunts Point Avenue station to compensate for the loss of the Bx6-SBS in Hunts Point. This change was proposed to be implemented by mid-2020. Due to the COVID-19 pandemic in New York City, the changes were halted for over a year. In February 2022, it was announced that the modifications would take place on June 26, 2022, however the Bx6-SBS rerouting to Soundview would be delayed until 2026, after OMNY fully replaces MetroCard.

== Incidents ==
On December 20, 2023, a Washington Heights-bound Bx6 SBS was at Bruckner Boulevard just after 9pm when it collided with a city sanitation truck. Both drivers and ten passengers on the bus were all injured.

On December 15, 2025, another driver at age 63 was doing the Bx6 Local to Washington Heights when at Cauldwell Avenue, she activated the emergency brakes. This caused the bus to hit several cars before stopping near Washington Avenue. A minimum of 7 passengers were injured, as well as the driver.

In the evening of July 30, 2026, a Hunts Point-bound Bx6 bus crashed into a Bx5 bus at East 163rd Street and Hunts Point Avenue, leaving five passengers injured. One passenger got its leg caught between the seats and three were taken to a nearby hospital. All are expected to survive.

== See also ==
=== Connecting bus routes ===
- M4, M5 (at Broadway)
- M3, M100, M101 (at Amsterdam Avenue)
- M2, M10 (at Edgecombe Avenue; Bx6 LCL only)
- Bx13 (at River Avenue)
- Bx1, Bx2, Bx32, BxM4 (at Sherman Avenue)
- Bx41, Bx41 SBS (at Melrose Avenue)
- Bx15, Bx21 (at Third Avenue)
- Bx17 (at Prospect Avenue)
- Bx4 (at Intervale Avenue)
- Bx5, Bx19 (at Southern Boulevard)
- Bx46 (at Viele Avenue)
