= Yankees–East 153rd Street station =

Metro-North Railroad station in the Bronx, New York

Yankees– E. 153rd Street
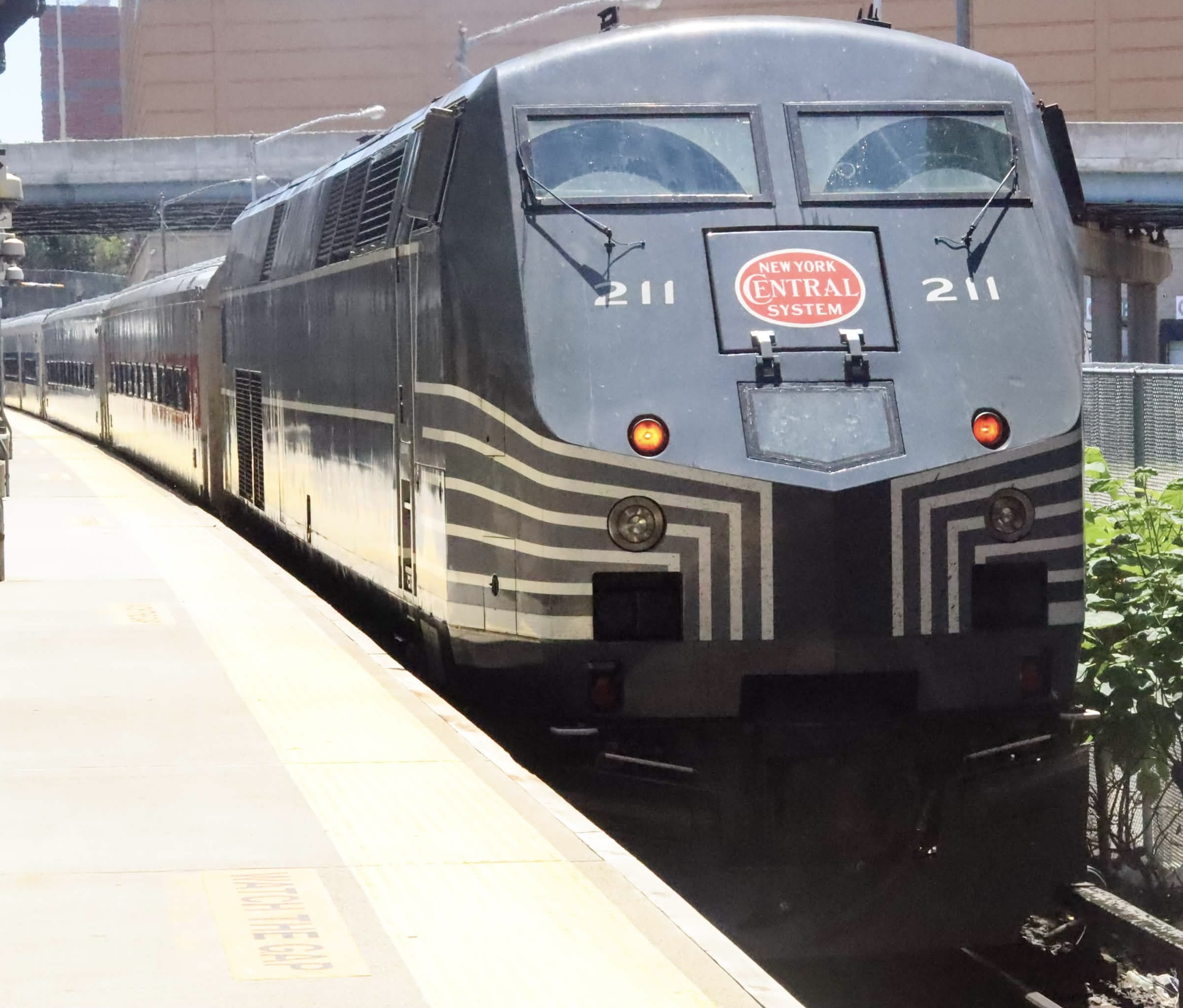
- P32AC-DM locomotive No. 211 on one of the platforms

General information
- Location: Exterior Street, Concourse, Bronx, Highbridge, New York
- Coordinates: 40°49′31.35″N 73°55′48.96″W
- Owner: Metro-North Railroad
- Line: Hudson Line
- Platforms: 2 island platforms
- Tracks: 4
- Connections: New York City Subway: at 161st Street–Yankee Stadium; New York City Bus: Bx6, Bx6 SBS, Bx13; NY Waterway (special event service); SeaStreak (special event service)

Construction
- Accessible: Yes

Other information
- Fare zone: 2

History
- Opened: May 23, 2009
- Electrified: 700V (DC) third rail

Passengers
- 2018: 519 (non-gameday) (Metro-North)
- Rank: 73 of 109

Services
Preceding station	Metro-North Railroad	Following station
Morris Heights toward Croton–Harmon	Hudson Line	Harlem–125th Street toward Grand Central
Special events service
Preceding station	Metro-North Railroad	Following station
Marble Hill toward Croton–Harmon	Hudson Line Special events only	Terminus
Croton–Harmon toward Poughkeepsie	Hudson Line Special events only	Terminus
Terminus	Harlem Line Special events only	Mount Vernon West toward Southeast
Terminus	New Haven Line Yankee Clipper	Mount Vernon East toward Stamford
Terminus	New Haven Line Yankee Clipper	Stamford toward New Haven
Terminus	GCT/Harlem 125th St	Harlem–125th Street toward Grand Central
Location

Yankees–East 153rd Street station is a commuter rail stop on the Metro-North Railroad's Hudson Line, serving Yankee Stadium in the Concourse and Highbridge neighborhoods of the Bronx, New York City. It opened on May 23, 2009, and provides daily local service on the Hudson Line.

The station is used during New York Yankees baseball games and New York City FC soccer matches at Yankee Stadium. There is also special service branded "Yankee Clipper" for Yankee games. Selected trains on the Harlem and New Haven lines also stop at this station on game days.

Shuttle trains and Hudson Line trains also transport fans between the stadium and Grand Central Terminal, helping to reduce traffic on the subway lines used to connect to New Jersey Transit and Long Island Rail Road trains at Penn Station.

== History ==
The project was promoted for several decades, and was incorporated into the MTA's annual budget in the 1980s. Despite being part of the old Yankee Stadium renovation plan during the 1970s, plans for the station did not commence until the impetus from new Yankee Stadium. Metro-North's Hudson Line had active track near the site. Some connections needed to be altered to provide New Haven Line and Harlem Line service.

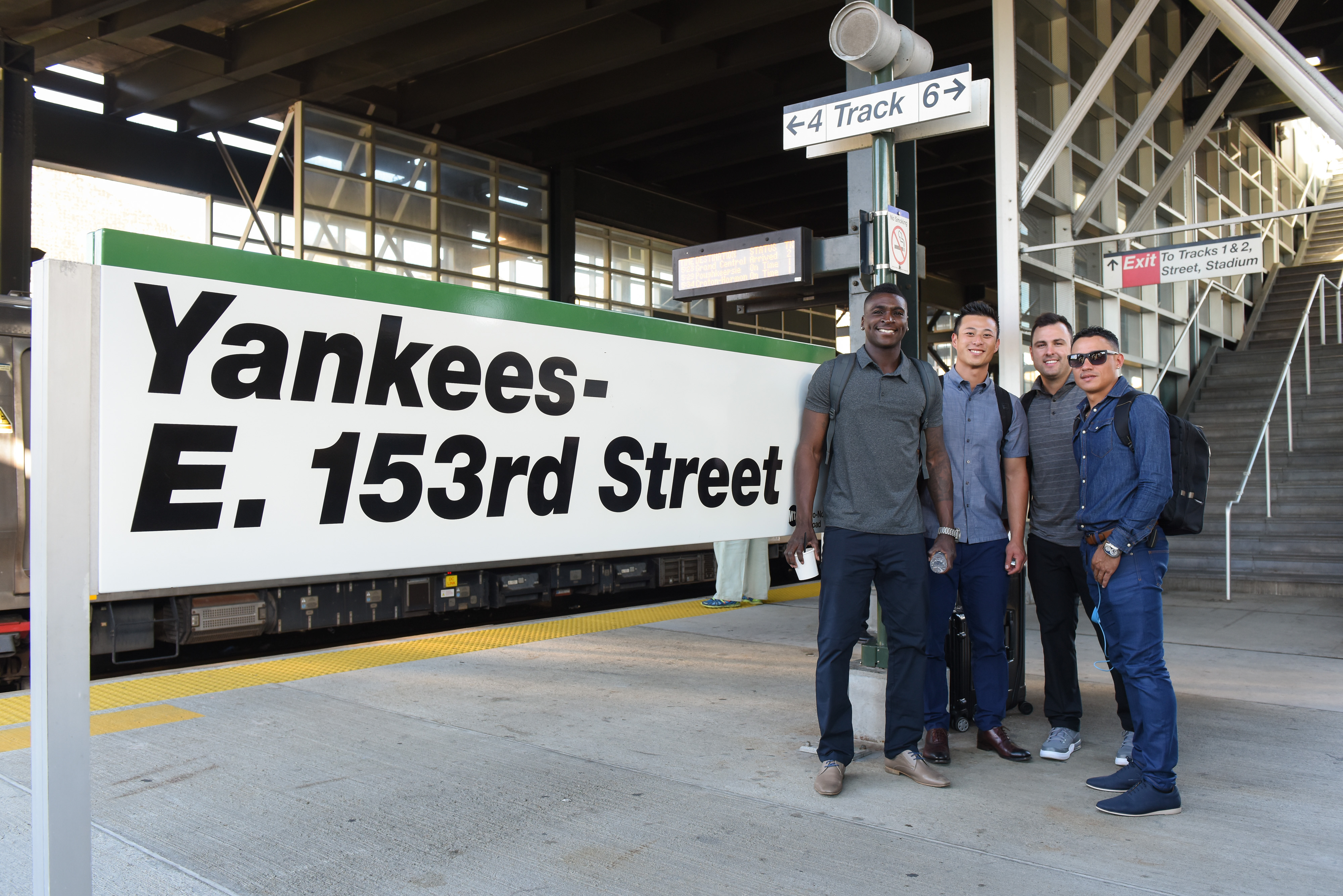
Yankees players Didi Gregorius, Rob Refsnyder, Nick Goody, and Ronald Torreyes pose on the platform in 2016

The station was designed to serve three Metro-North lines (Hudson, Harlem and New Haven) via existing track connections that were not normally used for passenger service.

The MTA estimated that the project would cost $91 million, including $52 million that it will provide and $39 million that will be provided by New York City. The MTA paid for the new station with $40 million from an account set aside to build a new subway connection to LaGuardia Airport that was canceled due to local community opposition, and $5 million from an existing account that had money set aside for new Yankee Stadium station in prior budgets. It opened on May 21, 2009, a month after the new Yankee Stadium's opening on April 2.

Transit watchdog groups claimed the money to construct the station would have to be diverted from other MTA transportation projects in the region. Several groups have urged the Yankees to pay for part, if not all, of the station's cost, since the Yankees would be the prime beneficiary of the station. The Yankees have said the Metro-North project is separate from their stadium project.

== Station layout ==
The station has two high-level island platforms each 10 cars long. Yankee Clipper trains that use the wye at the Mott Haven interlocking only operate on game days.

In 2018, track maintenance prevented direct Harlem Line and New Haven Line service from operating to the station, forcing riders to transfer at Harlem–125th Street to access Yankee Stadium. In 2019, only New Haven Line service used the wye.
