= Seventh Avenue (Manhattan) =

North–south avenue in Manhattan, New York

- Seventh Avenue South (south of 11th St); Fashion Avenue (26th–42nd Sts); Adam Clayton Powell Jr. Boulevard (north of 110th St)
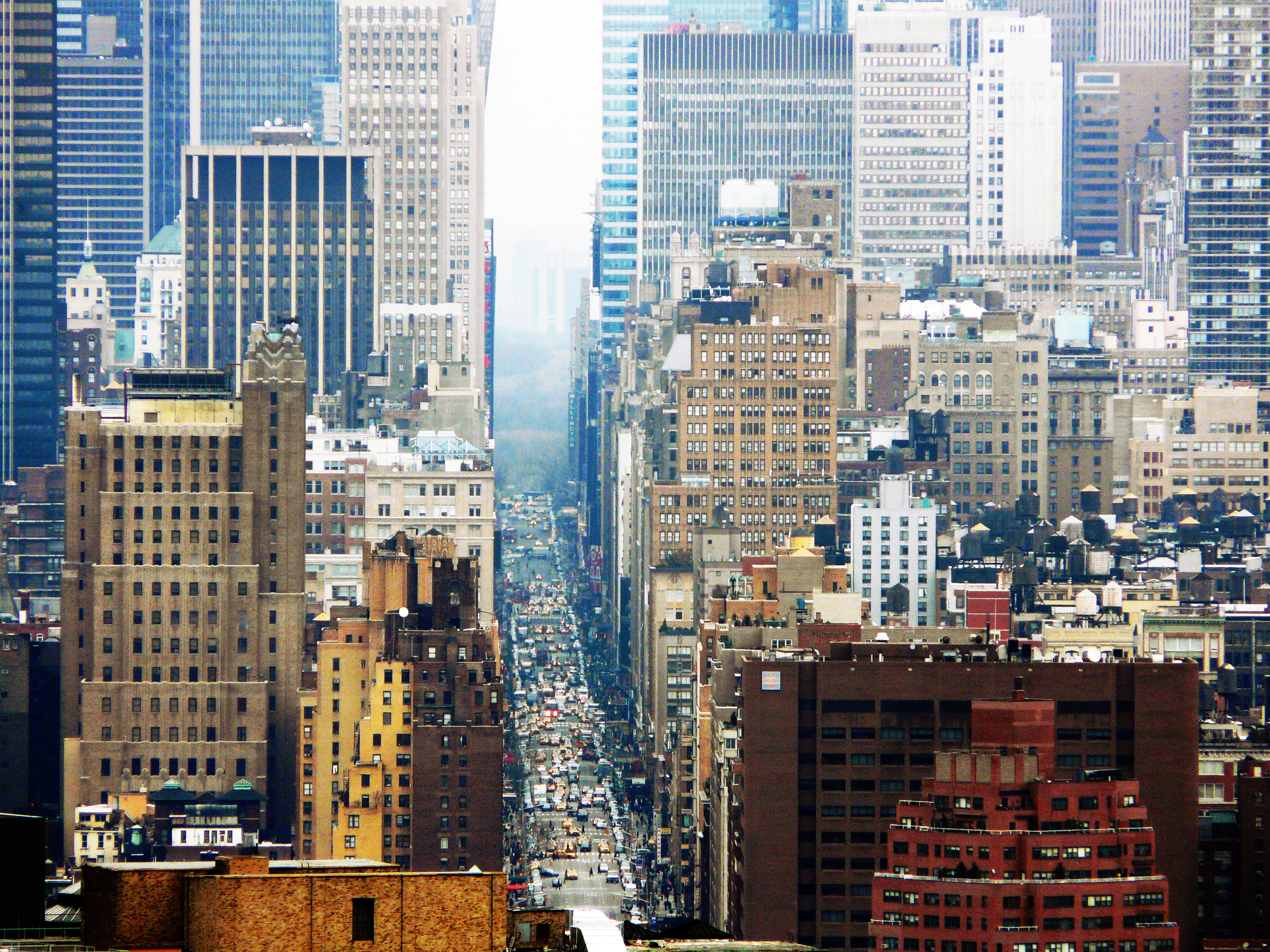
- Seventh Avenue heading north to Greenwich Village and Central Park
- Namesake: Garment District and Adam Clayton Powell Jr.
- Owner: City of New York
- Maintained by: NYCDOT
- Length: 5.3 mi (8.5 km)
- Location: Manhattan, New York City
- South end: Varick / Clarkson Streets in West Village
- Major junctions: Times Square in Midtown; Macombs Dam Bridge in Harlem
- North end: Harlem River Drive / 155th Street in Harlem
- East: Sixth Avenue (below 59th St); Lenox Avenue (above 110th St)
- West: Eighth Avenue (below 59th St); Douglass Boulevard (above 110th St)

Construction
- Commissioned: March 1811

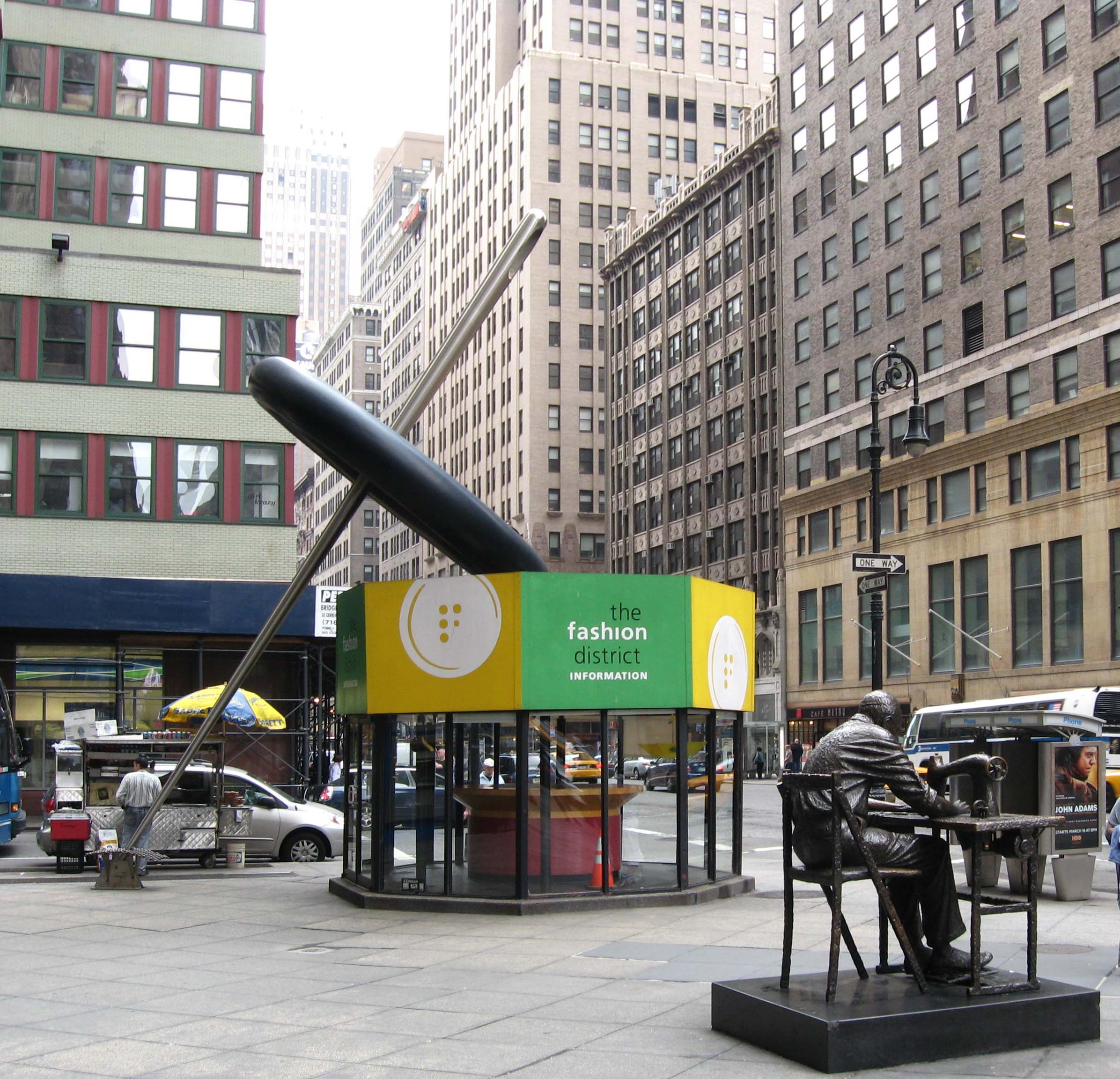
The information booth and sculpture at 39th Street in the Garment District

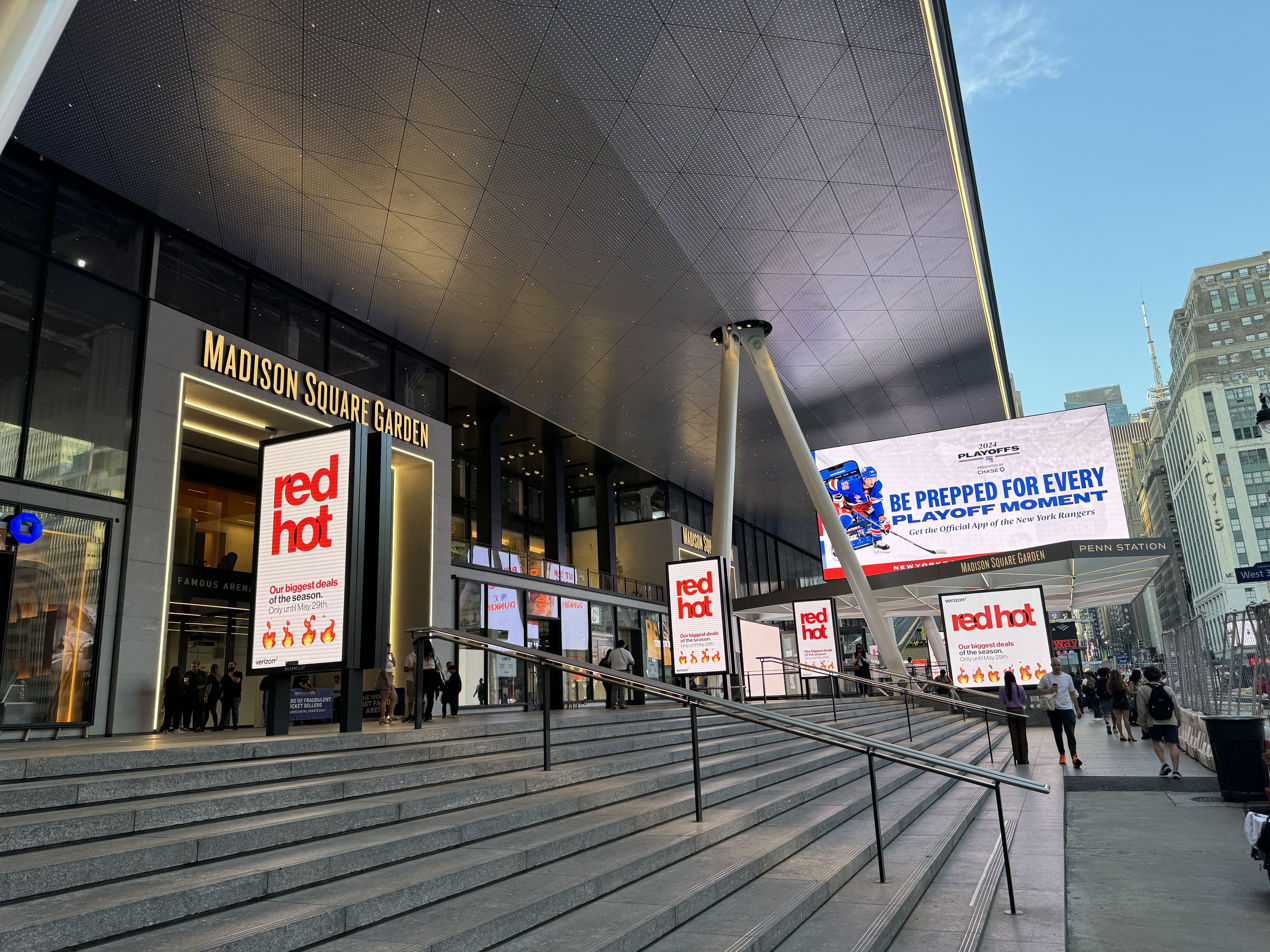
Madison Square Garden is located between West 31st and 33rd Streets; Pennsylvania Station is under it.

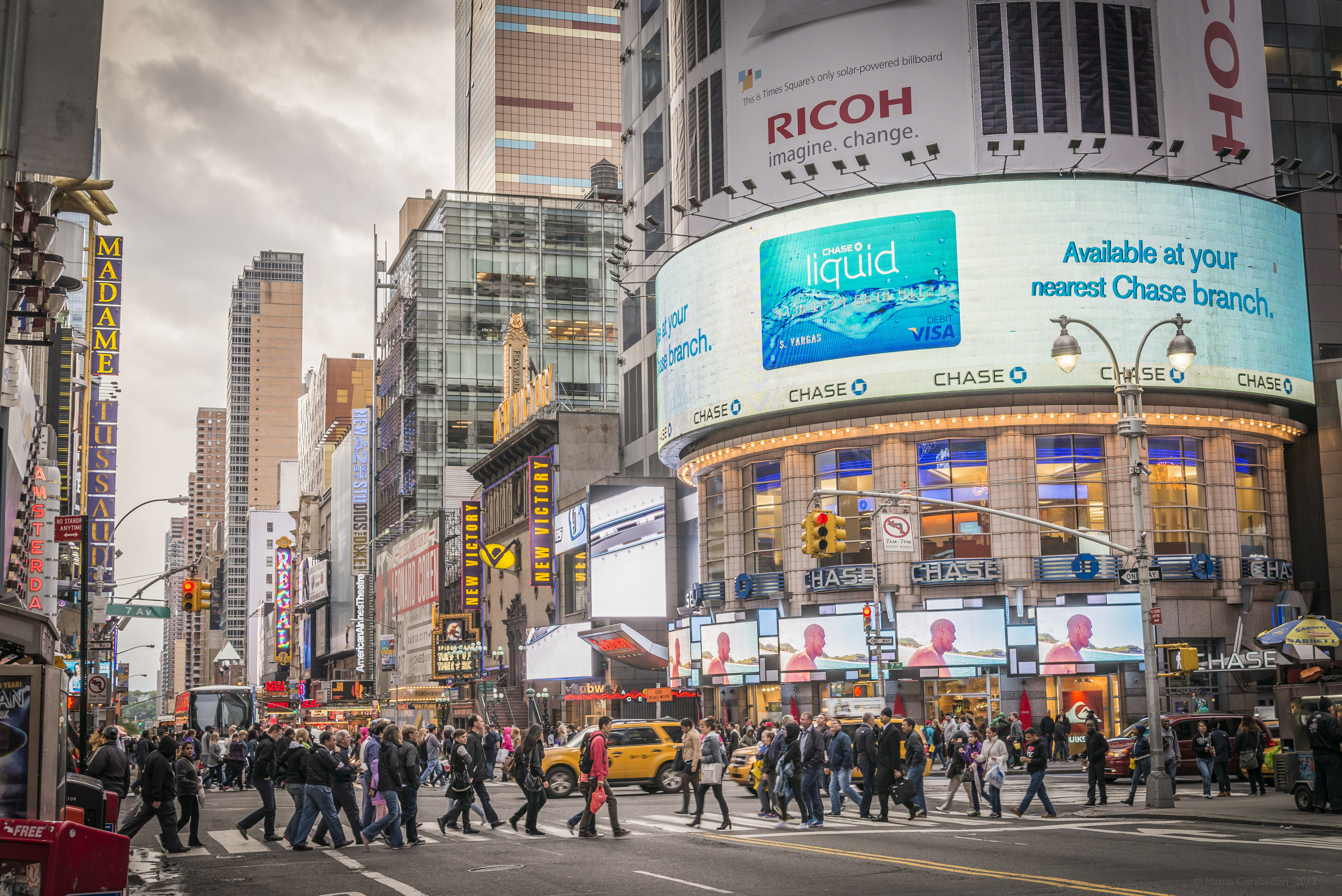
Crossing 42nd Street in Times Square

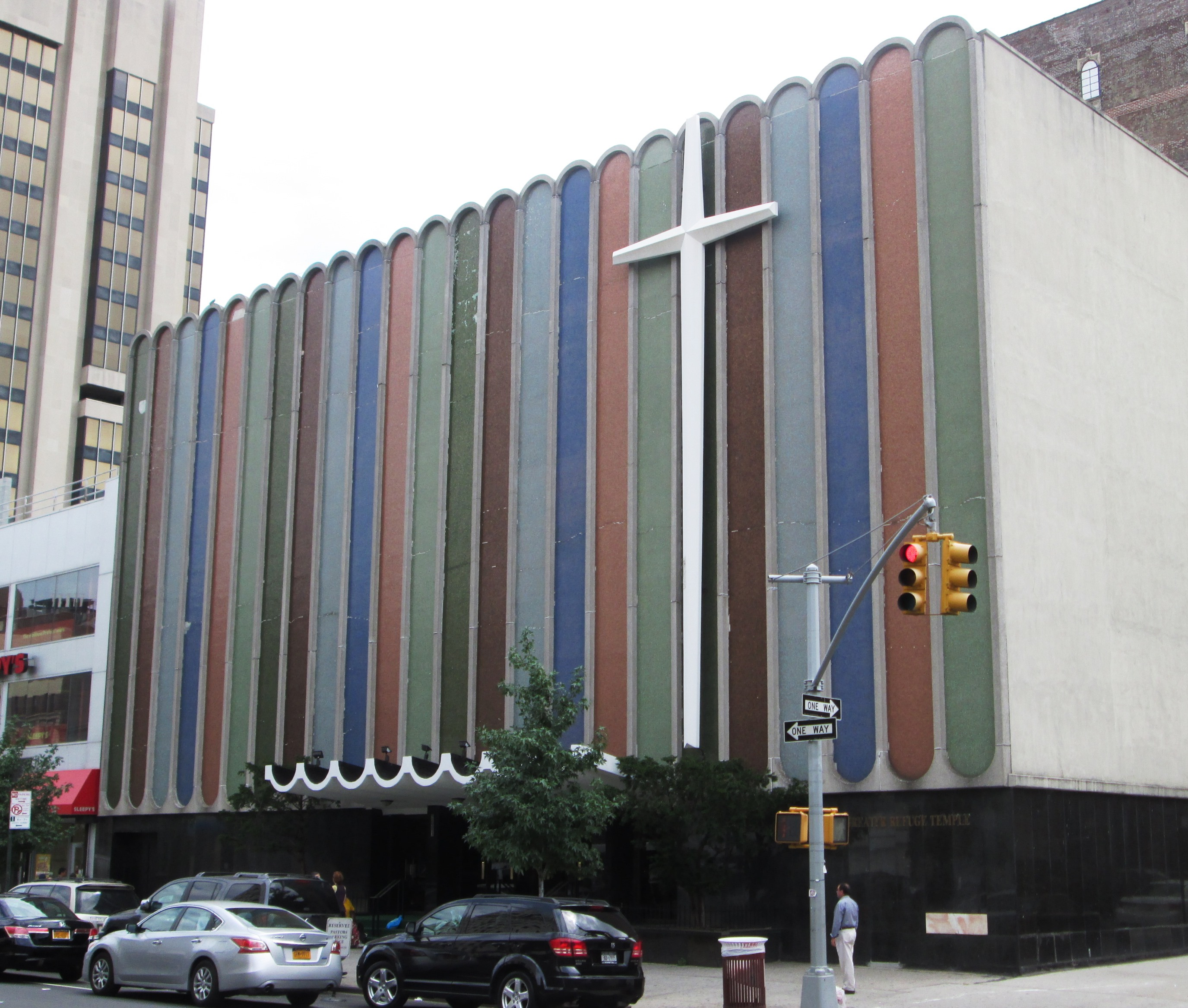
Greater Refuge Temple on Adam Clayton Powell Jr. Boulevard

Seventh Avenue—co-named Fashion Avenue in the Garment District and known as Adam Clayton Powell Jr. Boulevard north of Central Park—is a thoroughfare on the West Side of the borough of Manhattan in New York City. It is southbound below the park and a two-way street north of it.

Seventh Avenue originates in the West Village at Clarkson Street, where Varick Street becomes Seventh Avenue South (which becomes Seventh Avenue proper after the road crosses Greenwich Avenue and West 11th Street). It is interrupted by Central Park from 59th to 110th Street. Artisans' Gate is the 59th Street exit from Central Park to Seventh Avenue. North of Warriors' Gate at the north end of the Park, the avenue carries traffic in both directions through Harlem, where it is called Adam Clayton Powell Jr. Boulevard. Addresses continue as if the street was continuous through Central Park, with the first block north of the park being the 1800 block. The United States Postal Service delivers mail using either street name. As is the case with "Sixth Avenue" and "Avenue of the Americas", long-time New Yorkers continue to use the older name.

The street has two northern termini; an upper level terminates at the western end of the Macombs Dam Bridge, traveling over the Harlem River, where Jerome Avenue commences in the Bronx. A lower level continues a bit further north and curves into the lower level of West 155th Street.

== History ==
Seventh Avenue was originally laid out in the Commissioners' Plan of 1811.

The southern terminus of Seventh Avenue was Eleventh Street in Greenwich Village through the early part of the 20th century. It was extended southward, as Seventh Avenue South, to link up with Varick Street in 1914, and Varick was widened at the same time. Extension of the avenue allowed better vehicular connections between midtown Manhattan and the commercial district in what is now TriBeCa. It also permitted construction of the New York City Subway's IRT Broadway–Seventh Avenue Line which opened in 1918.

Extension of the avenue was under consideration for several years, and was approved by the New York City Board of Estimate in September 1911, when the first $3 million appropriation was made for the initial planning of the work. The extension had been urged by civic groups to meet the commercial needs of Greenwich Village. A significant number of old buildings were marked for demolition in the extension, and the demolished buildings included the Bedford Street Methodist Church, constructed in 1840. One outcome of this was the Hess triangle.

Most of Seventh Avenue has carried traffic one-way southbound since June 6, 1954. The portion north of Times Square carried two-way traffic until March 10, 1957. The stretch of Seventh Avenue in Harlem known as Adam Clayton Powell Jr. Boulevard was renamed in honor of the congressman in 1974.

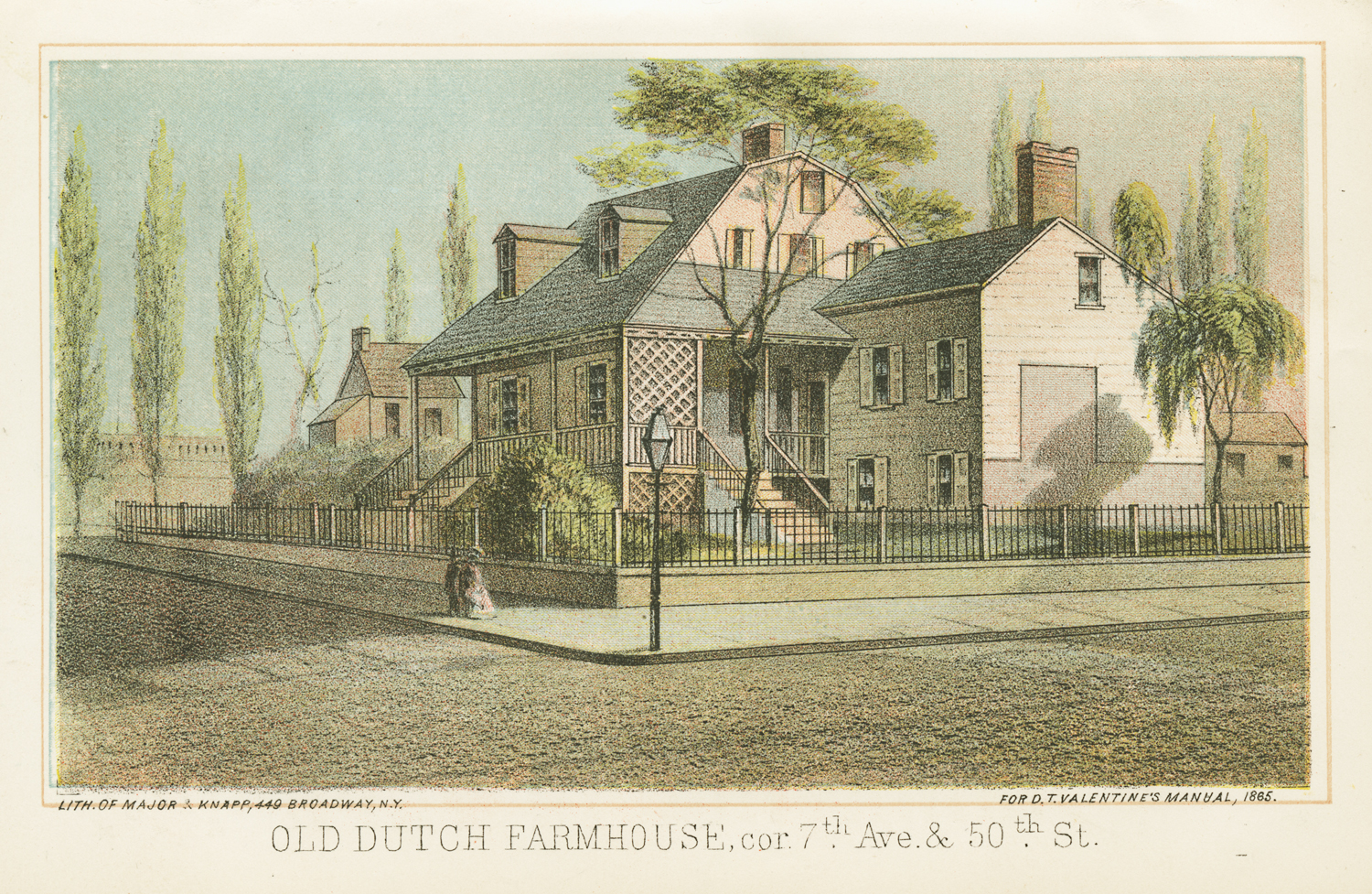
Old Dutch Farmhouse at 7th Avenue & 50th Street, 1865

== Transportation ==
Seventh Avenue is served by the 1, 2, and 3 trains for most of its length, with N, Q, R, and W service between 42nd Street and Central Park South. The Seventh Avenue station also serves the B, D, and E trains. North of the park, Powell Boulevard is served by the Harlem–148th Street on the 3 train, and the 155th Street station on the B and D trains.

It is also served by numerous local MTA New York City Bus routes downtown, with uptown buses on 8th Avenue unless specified below:

- The M20 serves the entire avenue south of Central Park.
- The M2 runs in both directions on Adam Clayton Powell Jr. Boulevard in its entirety.
- The M104 and M7 run until West 41st Street heading west, and West 14th Street heading east, respectively. The latter runs on 6th Avenue uptown.
- The Q32 runs from West 37th to West 32nd Streets, where it terminates. Uptown buses run on Madison Avenue.

== Notable districts and buildings ==
South of 14th Street Seventh Avenue is a major thoroughfare in the West Village. The now dismantled St. Vincent's Hospital was a main downtown hospital on Seventh Avenue and 11th Street.

Running through the Garment District (which stretches from 12th Avenue to 5th Avenue and 34th Street to 39th Street), it is referred to as Fashion Avenue due to its role as a center of the garment and fashion industry and the famed fashion designers who established New York as a world fashion capital. The first, temporary signs designating the section of Seventh Avenue as "Fashion Avenue" were dual-posted in 1972, with permanent signs added over the ensuing years.

Seventh Avenue intersects with Broadway and with 42nd Street at Times Square, with multiple buildings at the intersections.

Notable buildings located on Seventh Avenue include:

- Alwyn Court Apartments, 58th Street
- Carnegie Hall, Osborne Apartments, and Rodin Studios, 57th Street
- AXA Center (originally The Equitable Tower), at 51st Street
- Madison Square Garden and Penn Station, 32nd Street
- Fashion Institute of Technology, 27th Street

Notable buildings on Adam Clayton Powell Jr. Boulevard, from Central Park north through Harlem, include:

- Adam Clayton Powell Jr. State Office Building
- Hotel Theresa

== See also ==
- 6½ Avenue
