= Harlem River Drive =

Highway in New York

Harlem River Drive
- 369th Harlem Hellfighters Drive
- Harlem River Drive highlighted in red

Route information
- Maintained by NYSDOT
- Length: 4.20 mi (6.76 km)
- Existed: 1964–present
- Restrictions: No commercial vehicles

Major junctions
- South end: FDR Drive / RFK Bridge in East Harlem
- I-95 / US 1 in Highbridge Park
- North end: Dyckman Street / 10th Avenue in Inwood

Location
- Country: United States
- State: New York
- Counties: New York

Highway system
- New York Highways; Interstate; US; State; Reference; Parkways

Harlem River Drive is a 4.20-mile (6.76 km) controlled-access parkway in the New York City borough of Manhattan. It runs along the west bank of the Harlem River from the Triborough Bridge in East Harlem to 10th Avenue in Inwood, where the parkway ends and the road continues northwest as Dyckman Street. South of the Triborough Bridge, the parkway continues toward lower Manhattan as FDR Drive. All of Harlem River Drive is designated New York State Route 907P (NY 907P), an unsigned reference route.

The parkway north of 165th Street was originally part of the Harlem River Speedway, a horse carriage roadway opened in 1898. The rest of the parkway from 125th to 165th Street opened to traffic in stages from 1951 to 1962. The parkway's ceremonial designation, 369th Harlem Hellfighters Drive, is in honor of the 369th Infantry Regiment, also known as the Harlem Hellfighters.

== Route description ==
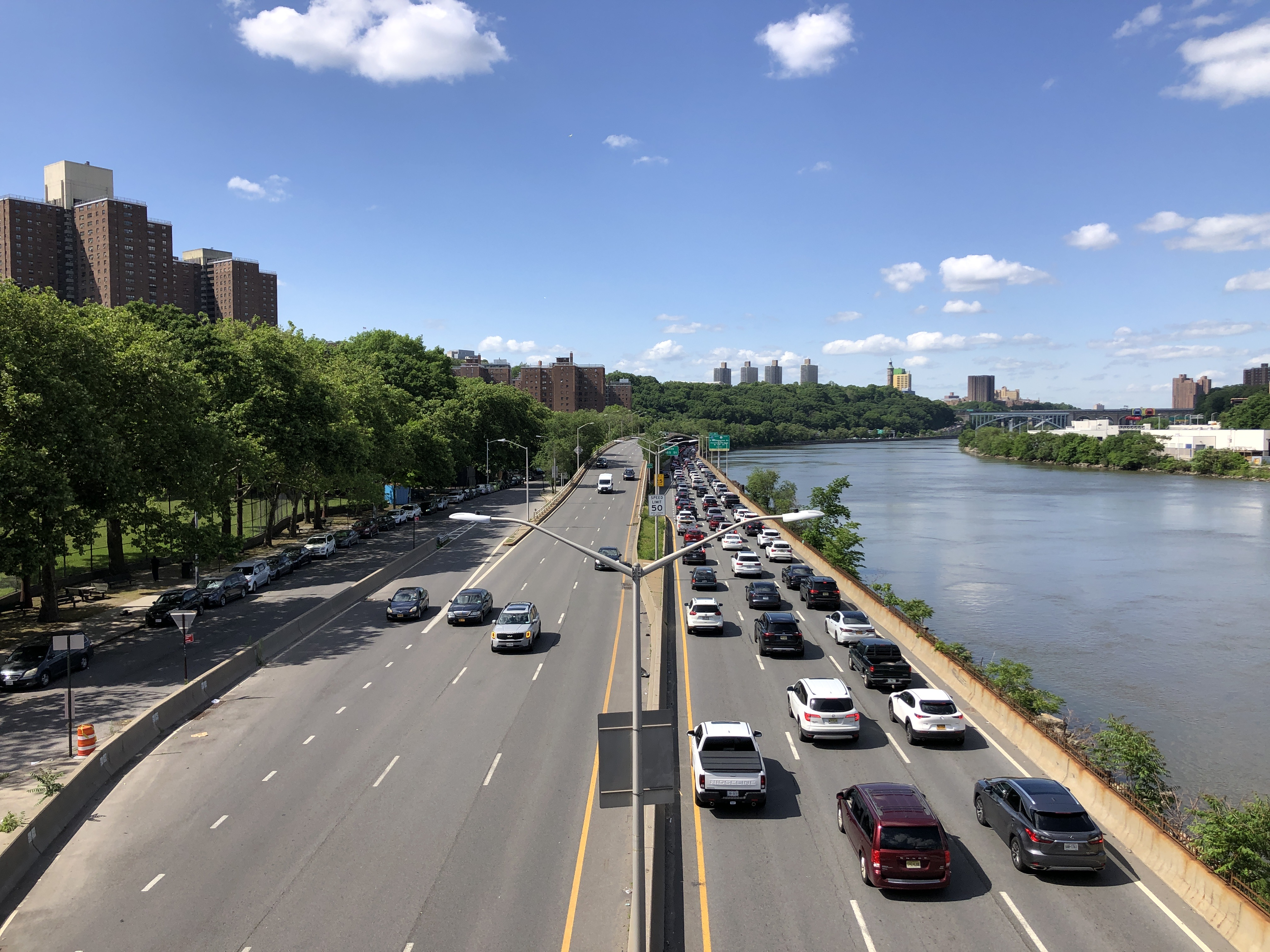
Northbound view of the Harlem River Drive at the Macombs Dam Bridge

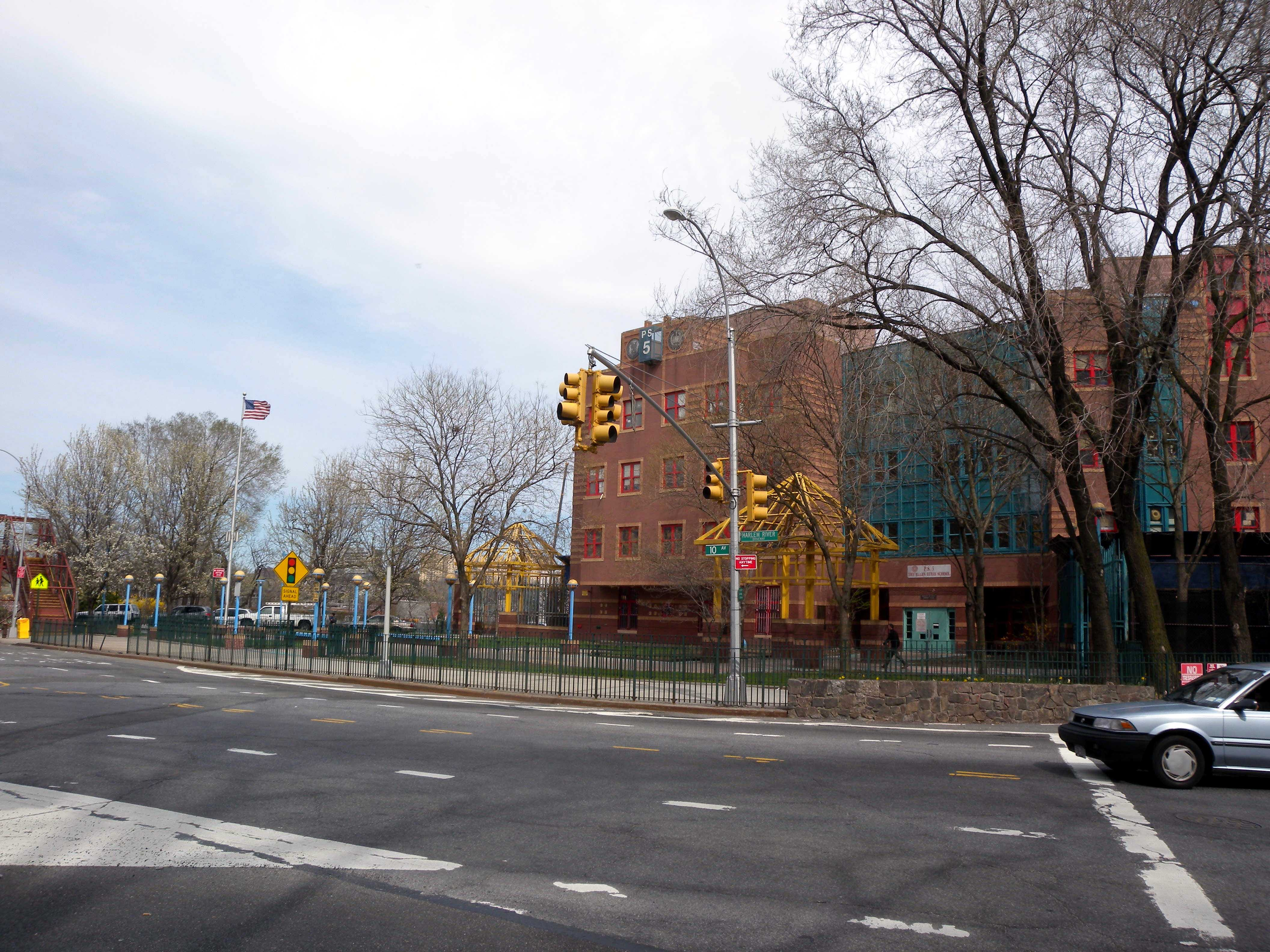
The northern terminus of Harlem River Drive at Dyckman Street and Tenth Avenue in Inwood

Harlem River Drive begins at exit 17 of the FDR Drive in the East Harlem section of Manhattan. The parkway crosses under 125th Street alongside the Harlem River, where exit 18 leads off the northbound lanes to the Willis Avenue Bridge before bending to the northwest. exit 19 leads off the southbound lanes to 125th Street. Harlem River Drive proceeds northwest, crosses under the Third Avenue Bridge, reaching exit 21 northbound, a junction for 135th Street. Southbound, exit 20 connects to Park Avenue. Continuing northward, Harlem River Drive continues north under the Madison Avenue Bridge. Southbound, Harlem River Drive meets exit 22, a junction to 142nd Street and Fifth Avenue.

Crossing under 145th Street, Harlem River Drive passes east of the 145th Street subway station on the IRT Lenox Avenue Line (3 train). It then passes directly east of the Lenox Yard and the Harlem – 148th Street station. Harlem River Drive crosses under the Macombs Dam Bridge, 155th Street, and Seventh Avenue before crossing northbound exit 23, a left exit to Frederick Douglass Boulevard. Then, the parkway runs east of the Polo Grounds site and merges with the southbound exit 23, an exit to Frederick Douglass Boulevard and the Harlem River Driveway, which runs south to 155th Street. Shortly after, Harlem River Drive enters exit 24, a four-lane viaduct that rises from the parkway to connect to the George Washington Bridge via I-95 and US 1 along the Trans-Manhattan Expressway, as well to Amsterdam Avenue in Washington Heights.

Harlem River Drive continues northeast as a four-lane parkway. Crossing under the Alexander Hamilton Bridge, Harlem River Drive crosses through Highbridge Park before turning away from the Harlem River in Inwood. The four-lane arterial continues north through Manhattan, entering a junction with Dyckman Street and Tenth Avenue, which is the northern end of Harlem River Drive.

== History ==
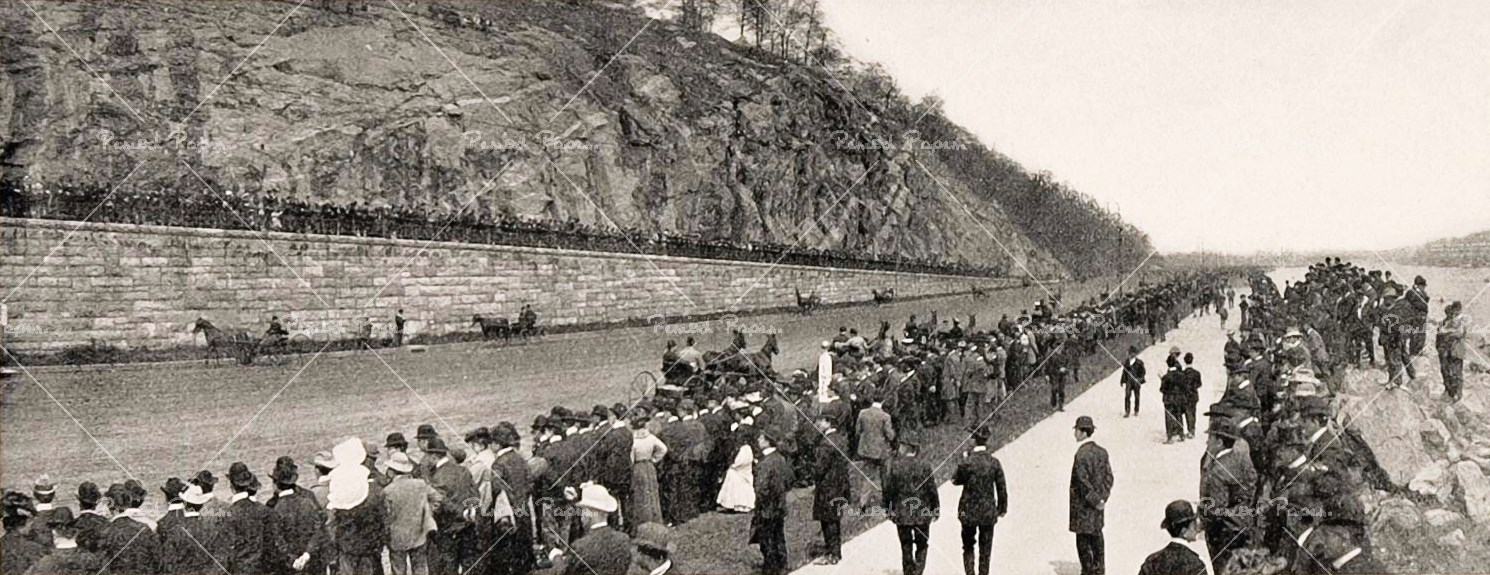
Harlem River Speedway in 1903

The Drive originated as the Harlem River Speedway, which started construction in 1894 and opened in July 1898. Originally, the Speedway was exclusively for the use of horse-drawn carriages and those on horseback; bicyclists were specifically excluded, as were sulkies and drays. The Speedway ran from West 155th Street to Dyckman Street, and soon became a tourist destination, where visitors watched carriage races and boat races on the river. Rich New Yorkers used the Speedway to train their horses and size up those of their friends and competitors. In 1919, motorists were allowed on the Speedway, but for normal driving purposes. The route was paved in 1922, and officially renamed the Harlem River Driveway.

In 1939, Manhattan Borough President Stanley M. Isaacs unveiled plans to build Harlem River Drive, which was planned as a four-lane road linking the Harlem River Speedway and East River (now FDR) Drive north of East 125th Street. The initial section of the drive would stretch from 125th to 165th Streets, near where it merged into the speedway. Traffic from the Triborough Bridge and the several Harlem River bridges joining the Major Deegan Expressway in the Bronx would feed into the drive. Harlem River Drive would also contain playgrounds and parks along its route, similar to those on East River Drive, There would be a service road abutting the drive's west side. Sections of the old speedway in the path of the highway would incorporated into the new highway. There would also be new ramps from the speedway section to the then-newly built George Washington Bridge.

The cost of Harlem River Drive was originally estimated at over $18 million, of which $11 million was used to build the highway itself and nearly $7 million in acquired lands. However, there were some disagreements during the planning of the new highway, and by 1946, the cost had increased to $26 million.

The modern Harlem River Drive was completed in segments during the 1950s and early 1960s. The segment connecting the Speedway to Eighth Avenue, which ended at 159th Street, was completed in 1951. The highway from 125th Street and First Avenue to 132nd Street and Park Avenue opened in 1958, connecting three of the Harlem River bridges. Another section between 142nd and 161st Streets opened in 1960, and an extension south to 132nd Street opened two years later, closing the gap between the two sections. In 1964, shortly after the drive's completion, the entire drive was widened to six lanes.

In 2003, the New York State Department of Transportation ceremonially designated the parkway as the "369th Harlem Hellfighters Drive" in honor of the all-black regiment that fought to defend France during World War I.

As of April 2010, the Manhattan Waterfront Greenway runs between the river and the drive, from 155th to Dyckman Streets, in a portion of Highbridge Park which had been abandoned and fenced off approximately half a century.

As part of the reconstruction of the Willis Avenue Bridge, its ramps with the road were rebuilt.

== Exit list ==
Exit numbers continue sequentially from those of FDR Drive. The entire route is in the New York City borough of Manhattan.

Location	mi	km	Exit	Destinations	Notes
East Harlem	0.00	0.00	–	FDR Drive south – Battery Park	Continuation south
East Harlem	0.00	0.00	17	RFK Bridge (NY 900G south) to I-278 / Grand Central Parkway east – Bruckner Expressway	Also serves Randall's Island
East Harlem	0.1	0.16	18	Willis Avenue Bridge to I-87 north (Major Deegan Expressway)	Northbound exit only; former NY 1A
East Harlem	0.1– 0.5	0.16– 0.80	19	2nd Avenue / East 125th Street	Southbound left exit
East Harlem	0.5	0.80	–	Third Avenue Bridge	Southbound entrance only; former NY 1A
East Harlem	0.61	0.98	20	Park Avenue / East 132nd Street	Southbound exit and entrance
East Harlem	0.77	1.24	21	East 135th Street / Madison Avenue Bridge	Northbound exit only
East Harlem	0.90– 1.40	1.45– 2.25	22	5th Avenue / West 142nd Street	No northbound exit
Washington Heights	2.1	3.4	23	Frederick Douglass Boulevard / West 155th Street	Northbound left exit and southbound entrance
Washington Heights	2.6	4.2	23	Frederick Douglass Boulevard to West 155th Street	Southbound exit and northbound entrance; access via Harlem River Driveway
Highbridge Park	2.8	4.5	24	I-95 south / US 1 south / Amsterdam Avenue / West 179th Street – George Washington Bridge	Northbound left exit and southbound left entrance; exit 1B on I-95
Inwood	4.20	6.76	–	Dyckman Street / 10th Avenue	Northern terminus; at-grade intersection
1.000 mi = 1.609 km; 1.000 km = 0.621 mi: Electronic toll collection; Incomplete access

== See also ==
- Eddie Palmieri's recording and band "Harlem River Drive"
