= Coogan's Bluff =

Promontory in Manhattan, New York

Coordinates: 40.8326°N 73.9393°W

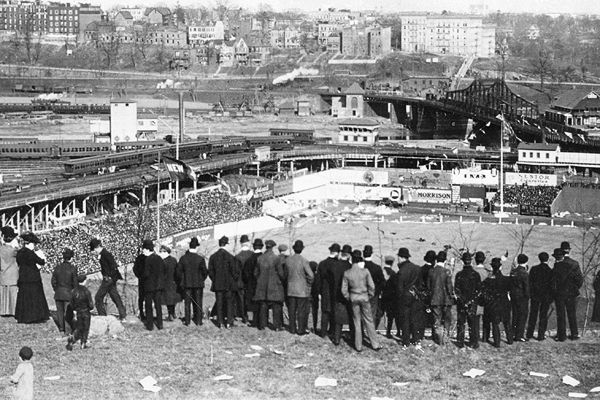
Fans on Coogan's Bluff watch the infamous Merkle's Boner game between the Giants and Cubs at the Polo Grounds, September 23, 1908

Coogan's Bluff is a promontory near the western shore of the Harlem River in the Washington Heights neighborhood of Upper Manhattan in New York City. Its boundaries extend approximately from 155th Street and the Macombs Dam Bridge viaduct to 160th Street, between Edgecombe Avenue and the river. A deep escarpment descends 175 feet (53 m) from Edgecombe Avenue to the river, creating a sheltered area between the bluff and river known as Coogan's Hollow. From 1890 to 1964, the hollow was home to the Polo Grounds sports stadium.

== Namesake ==
The promontory is named for James J. Coogan (1846–1915), a real estate developer and one-term Manhattan Borough President, who owned the land during the late 19th and early 20th centuries. The earliest known published reference to "Coogan's Bluff" appeared in The New York Times in 1893.

== Polo Grounds ==
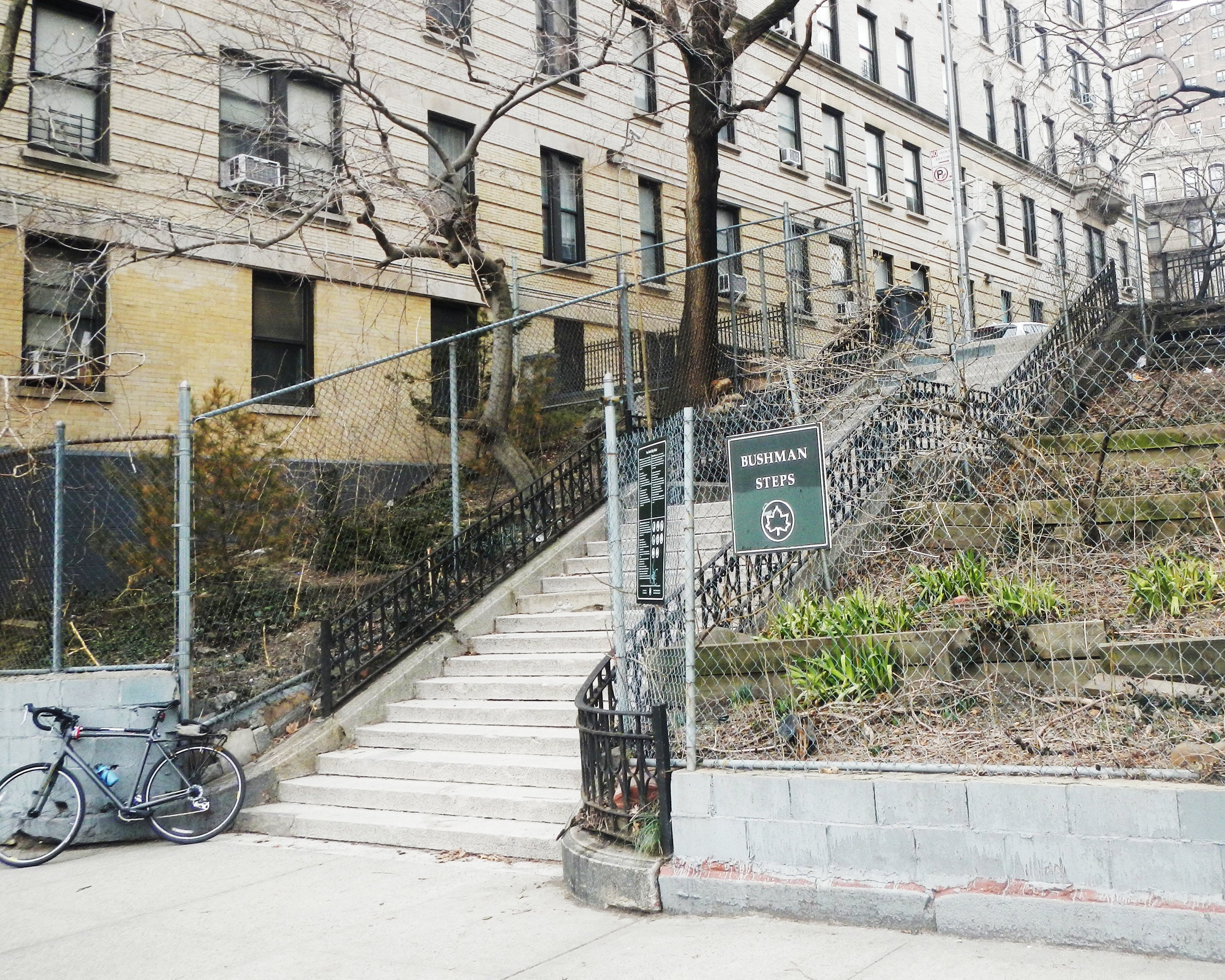
The Bushman Steps, looking westward from Edgecombe Avenue

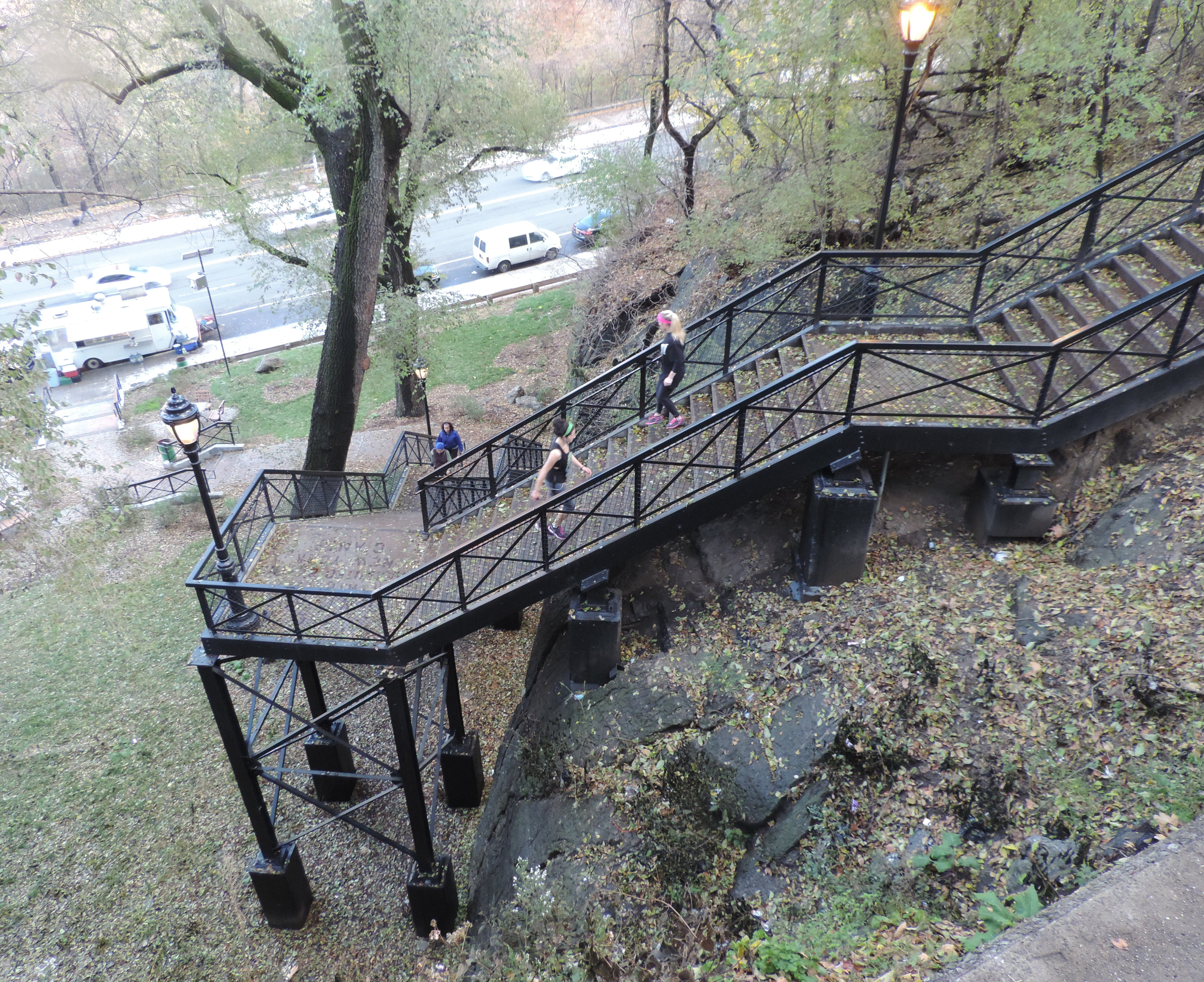
The John T. Brush Stairway from Edgecombe Avenue, descending through Highbridge Park toward Harlem River Drive

From 1890 until April 1964, the bluff overlooked the Polo Grounds, a stadium that served as the home field of Major League Baseball's New York Giants from 1891 until the franchise's move to San Francisco after the 1957 season. Sportswriters commonly used Coogan's Bluff as a sobriquet for the Polo Grounds. The stadium was actually situated in Coogan's Hollow, the bottomland between the bluff and the river. The Coogan heirs continued to own the land on which the Polo Grounds stood even though the Giants owned the stadium. This stymied the Giants' efforts to maintain the stadium and was a factor in their decision to move to San Francisco after the 1957 season.

Before the opening of the first Yankee Stadium in 1923, the New York Yankees shared the Polo Grounds with the Giants for ten seasons (1913–1922). For their first 31 years, the football Giants of the National Football League (NFL) played home games at the Polo Grounds (1925–1955), then went to Yankee Stadium. After four seasons without a baseball team (1958–1961), the expansion New York Mets were tenants in 1962 and 1963, then moved to the new Shea Stadium in northern Queens in 1964. The New York Titans/Jets of the American Football League (AFL) played their first four seasons at the venue (1960–1963), then also left for Shea in 1964.

The Bushman Steps, located just west of Coogan's Bluff in Sugar Hill/Hamilton Heights, led from the 155th Street subway station to the Polo Grounds ticket booths; the John T. Brush Stairway, on West 157th Street between St Nicholas Avenue and Edgecombe Avenue, then carried fans the rest of the way down to the stadium. The two stairways are the only intact structures that remain from the Polo Grounds era. The Brush Stairway was named in honor of the owner of the Giants franchise from 1890 until his death in 1912. The identity of the namesake of the Bushman Steps has apparently been lost.

== Housing complex ==
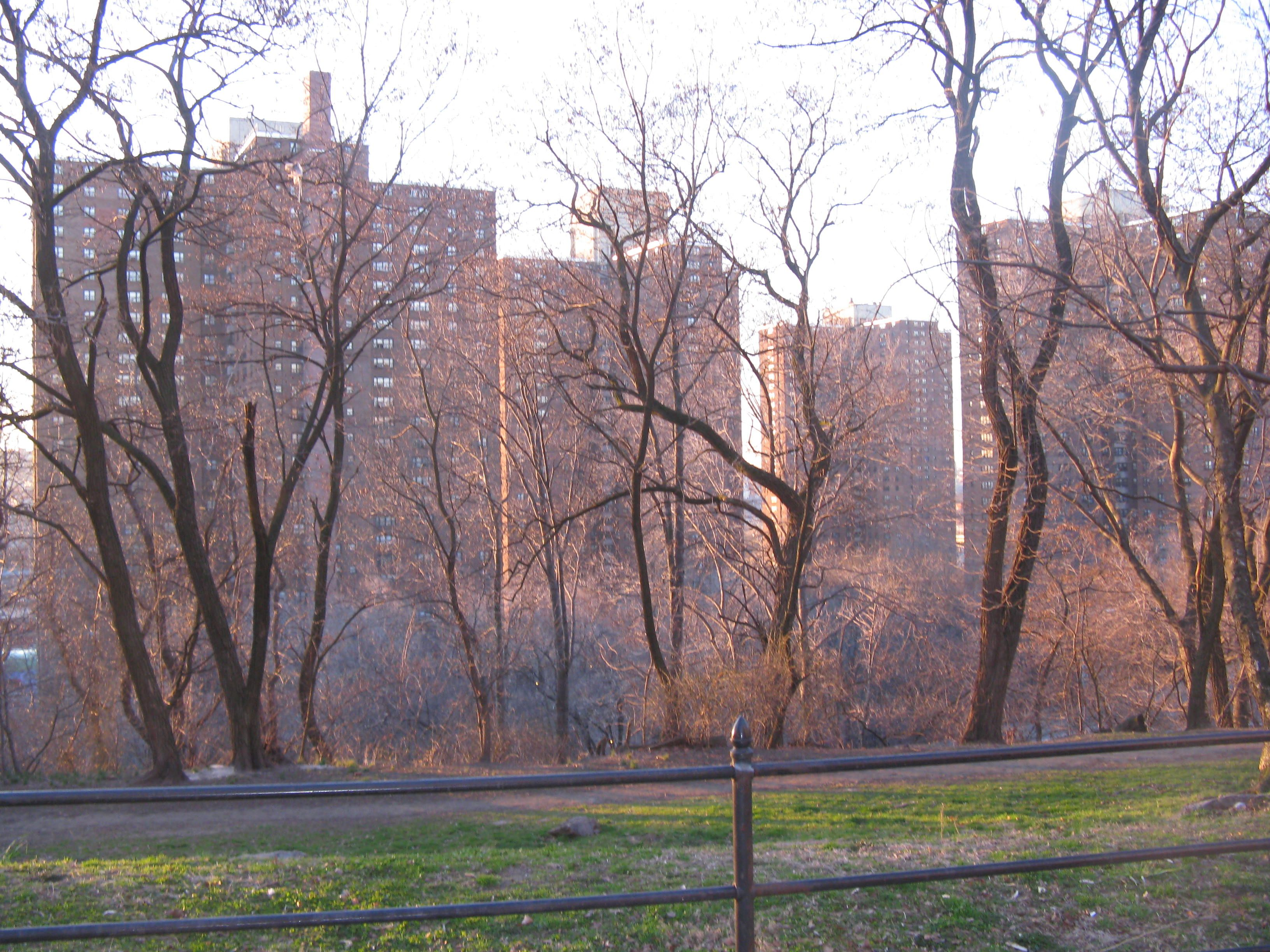
The Polo Grounds Towers from Coogan's Bluff

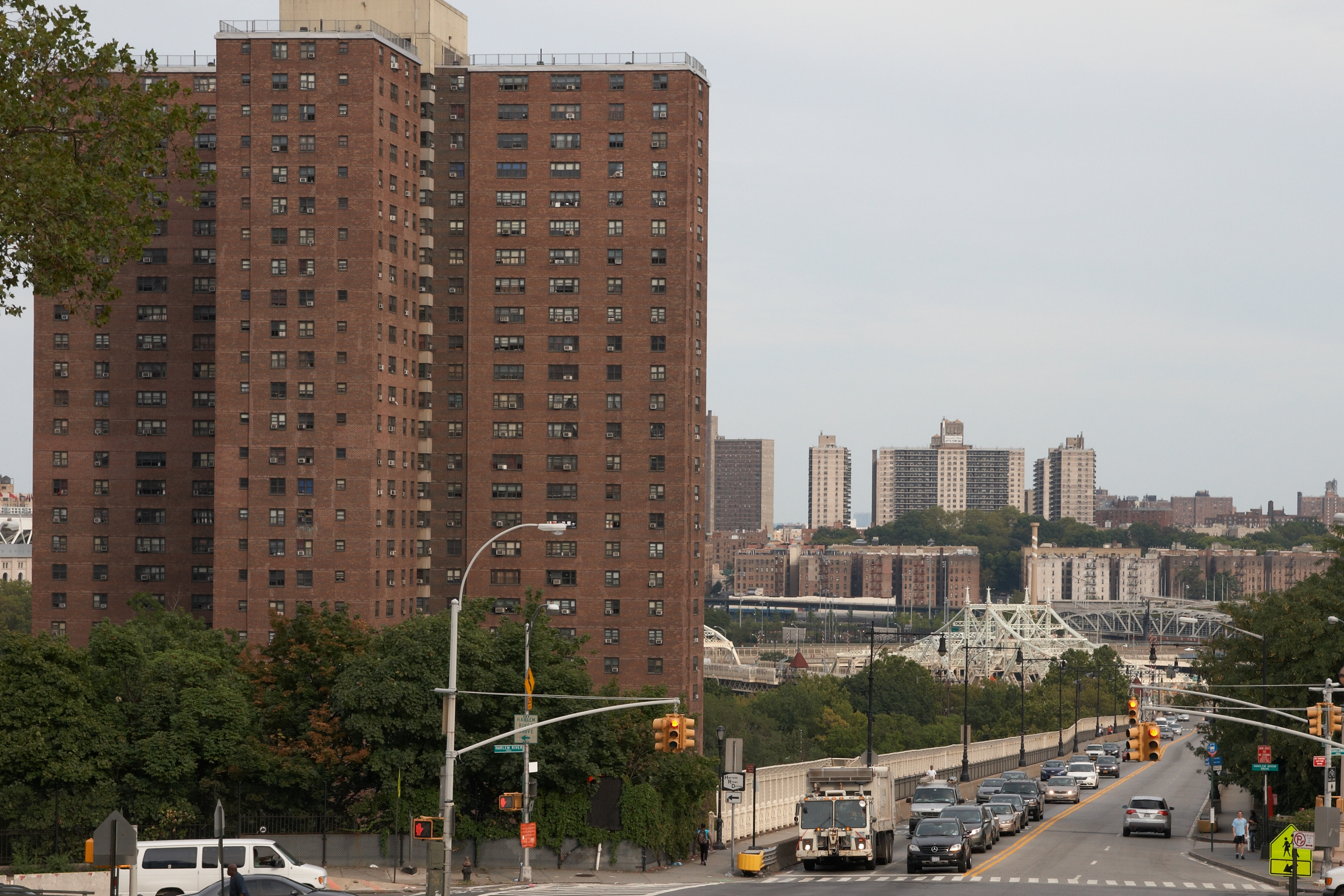
Polo Grounds Towers from West 155th Street, with the Macombs Dam Bridge and the Bronx in the background

The 15.15-acre (6.13 ha) hollow, bordered by Frederick Douglass Boulevard, West 155th Street and Harlem River Drive, is currently home to the Polo Grounds Towers housing complex: four 30-story buildings containing a total of 1,616 apartments. The complex was completed on June 30, 1968, and is run by the New York City Housing Authority. Attached to Tower #2 is the Polo Grounds Community Center, run by Children's Village, which hosts such programs as the Polo Grounds Youth Conference. A plaque on the property marks the approximate location of home plate within the demolished ballpark.

== Transportation ==
Coogan's Bluff can be reached via the New York City Subway's 155th Street station, on the IND Concourse Line (B and D trains). City bus routes Bx6, Bx6 SBS, M2 and M10 service the area as well.

== Nearby points of interest ==
The Morris-Jumel Mansion, the oldest house in Manhattan still standing (built in 1765 and now a museum) is located nearby, in Washington Heights. South of 155th Street, Coogan's Bluff becomes a smaller cliff within Jackie Robinson Park. Immediately across the Harlem River, in the Bronx, is Yankee Stadium, home of Major League Baseball's New York Yankees.

== See also ==
- Curse of Coogan's Bluff
