= New York State Route 1A =

Former state highway in New York State

New York State Route 1A
- NY 1A highlighted in red

Route information
- Maintained by NYSDH
- Length: 17.84 mi (28.71 km)
- Existed: December 1934–c. 1962

Major junctions
- South end: NY 27 in Manhattan
- North end: US 1 in Pelham Manor

Location
- Country: United States
- State: New York
- Counties: New York, Bronx, Westchester

Highway system
- New York Highways; Interstate; US; State; Reference; Parkways
| ← US 1 | → NY 1B |

New York State Route 1A (NY 1A) was a north–south state highway mostly located within New York City. It extended for just under 18 miles (29 km) from an intersection with NY 27 near the Holland Tunnel in Lower Manhattan to an interchange with U.S. Route 1 (US 1) just north of the New York City line in the Westchester County village of Pelham Manor. In Manhattan and the South Bronx, NY 1A used several surface streets to traverse the boroughs, including a handful of one-way roads. At the Bronx River, it began to follow limited-access highways, specifically the Bruckner Expressway and the Hutchinson River Parkway.

The route was among those created when routes were first marked in New York City in 1934. At the time, NY 1A ran from the Holland Tunnel to US 1 and the Pelham Parkway at Bronx Park. Over the next three decades, the route was gradually altered to accommodate changes in New York City's street network, including the construction of new roads and the conversion of parallel two-way streets into one-way couplets. The designation was eliminated in the early 1960s.

== Route description ==
NY 1A began in the vicinity of the Holland Tunnel in Lower Manhattan at Canal Street, designated as part of NY 27. It initially headed north on a one-way couplet, with northbound NY 1A following Sixth Avenue and southbound traffic using Varick Street one block to the west. The couplet ended at Houston Street, where both directions of the route turned eastward. As the route crossed Manhattan, it intersected the then-southern terminus of NY 22 at Lafayette Street. The highway continued to follow Houston Street until a junction with Second Avenue, the south end of another one-way couplet. While NY 1A southbound followed Second Avenue, the northbound direction proceeded east along Houston Street for another block to reach First Avenue. North of Houston Street, the couplet ran on a linear northeast–southwest alignment across Manhattan's east side, paralleling NY 22 to the west and FDR Drive to the east.

The one-way pair continued on First and Second avenues to the Harlem River, where both directions of the route crossed the river on separate one-way bridges. NY 1A northbound used the Willis Avenue Bridge while the southbound direction used the Third Avenue Bridge three blocks to the northwest. Between the Third Avenue Bridge and Second Avenue, NY 1A was routed on 128th Street. Across the river in the Bronx, both bridges ultimately connected to Bruckner Boulevard, with the Third Avenue Bridge making the connection via Lincoln Avenue and 135th Street. Bruckner Boulevard carried only NY 1A southbound from Lincoln Avenue to Willis Avenue, where NY 1A north left the latter street to join the southbound route. Now a unified route once again, NY 1A followed Bruckner Boulevard northeast through the southernmost part of the South Bronx to the Bronx River, where the surface street merged into the Bruckner Expressway.

From here, NY 1A was routed along limited-access highways for the remainder of its length. It followed the Bruckner Expressway east to the Bruckner Interchange, where the route turned north onto the Hutchinson River Parkway. NY 1A proceeded along the parkway through the eastern part of the Bronx and Pelham Bay Park to Westchester County, where it ended at an interchange with US 1 just north of the New York City line in the village of Pelham Manor. NY 1A would end on the off-ramp to US 1 (now exit 7 on the Hutchinson River Parkway), while the Hutchinson River Parkway continued northeast through Westchester County toward the Connecticut state line.

== History ==
New York City did not have posted routes until mid-December 1934. Earlier plans, drawn up in 1932 and 1933 by the New York Automobile Club, took US 1 through the Holland Tunnel and north through the upper east side of Manhattan. However, by 1934, the approaches to the George Washington Bridge were completed, and so US 1 was rerouted to use that bridge and cross through upper Manhattan. NY 1A was assigned to what had been planned as US 1 south of Fordham Road and the Bronx and Pelham Parkway, using the following streets:

- Sixth Avenue from the Holland Tunnel north to Houston Street (northbound only, as it had become one-way since the 1933 plan; southbound traffic used Varick Street)
- Houston Street from Sixth Avenue (and Varick Street) to Second Avenue
- Second Avenue from Houston Street north to 23rd Street
- 23rd Street from Second Avenue east to First Avenue
- First Avenue from 23rd Street north to the Willis Avenue Bridge
- Southern Boulevard (now partly Bruckner Boulevard) from the Willis Avenue Bridge northeast to West Farms Road
- West Farms Road from Southern Boulevard to Boston Road
- Boston Road from West Farms Road to Fordham Road (US 1) and the Bronx and Pelham Parkway

In December 1937, the Hutchinson River Parkway was extended southward from US 1 in Pelham Manor to Pelham Bay Park in the Bronx. The new highway became part of NY 1A, which was rerouted through the Bronx to follow Bruckner Boulevard and Shore Road to Pelham Bay Park. From there, NY 1A followed the parkway north to a new terminus at US 1 just north of the city line. A second southward extension of the parkway from Pelham Bay Park to NY 1A at the Bruckner Interchange opened in 1941. The new road was originally designated as NY 1X; however, the NY 1X designation was replaced with a rerouted NY 1A in 1946.

The Willis Avenue Bridge became one-way northbound on August 5, 1941, and the Third Avenue Bridge became one-way southbound. Southbound NY 1A was thus rerouted along Lincoln Avenue, 135th Street, and Third Avenue onto the bridge, and 128th Street, Second Avenue and 122nd Street to return to First Avenue. A direct connection from Southern Boulevard to the Third Avenue Bridge was later built. On June 4, 1951, First and Second Avenues were made into a one-way pair north of Houston Street, moving northbound NY 1A south of 23rd Street and southbound NY 1A between 23rd Street and 122nd Street. The NY 1A designation was completely removed c. 1962.

== Major intersections ==
| County | Location | mi | km | Exit | Destinations | Notes |
|---|---|---|---|---|---|---|
| New York | Manhattan | 0.00 | 0.00 | | NY 27 (Canal Street) | Southern terminus |
| New York | Manhattan | 0.93 | 1.50 | | NY 22 (Lafayette Street) | Southern terminus of NY 22 and NY 100 |
| New York | Manhattan | 2.96 | 4.76 | | To NY 24 via 34th Street | |
| New York | Manhattan | | | | NY 25 (Queensboro Bridge) | Southbound intersection only |
| Harlem River | | 7.55 | 12.15 | Willis Avenue Bridge | | |
| Bronx | The Bronx | 8.43 | 13.57 | | I-87 (Major Deegan Expressway) / I-278 (Triborough Bridge) | |
| Bronx | The Bronx | South end of freeway section | | | | |
| Bronx | The Bronx | 11.34 | 18.25 | | Bronx River Parkway | |
| Bronx | The Bronx | 11.74 | 18.89 | | White Plains Road | |
| Bronx | The Bronx | 13.18 | 21.21 | 1 | I-95 (Cross Bronx Expressway) / NY 164 / Hutchinson River Parkway | Bruckner Interchange; southern terminus of NY 1A / Hutchinson River Parkway overlap |
| Bronx | The Bronx | 13.94 | 22.43 | 2 | Tremont Avenue / Westchester Avenue | |
| Bronx | The Bronx | 15.33 | 24.67 | 3 | Pelham Parkway | |
| Bronx | The Bronx | 15.69 | 25.25 | 4 | I-95 (New England Thruway) / NY 164 | |
| Bronx | The Bronx | 16.54 | 26.62 | 5 | Pelham Bay Park | |
| Bronx | The Bronx | 17.42 | 28.03 | 6 | I-95 north (New England Thruway) | Northbound exit and southbound entrance |
| Westchester | Pelham Manor | 17.84 | 28.71 | 7 | US 1 (Boston Post Road) / Hutchinson River Parkway north | Northern terminus; northern terminus of NY 1A / Hutchinson River Parkway overlap |
1.000 mi = 1.609 km; 1.000 km = 0.621 mi: Concurrency terminus; Incomplete access

== See also ==
- U.S. Route 1 Business (now Route 139), which continued NY 1A back to its parent in Jersey City, New Jersey
