= 155th Street station (IND Concourse Line) =

New York City Subway station in Manhattan

155 Street
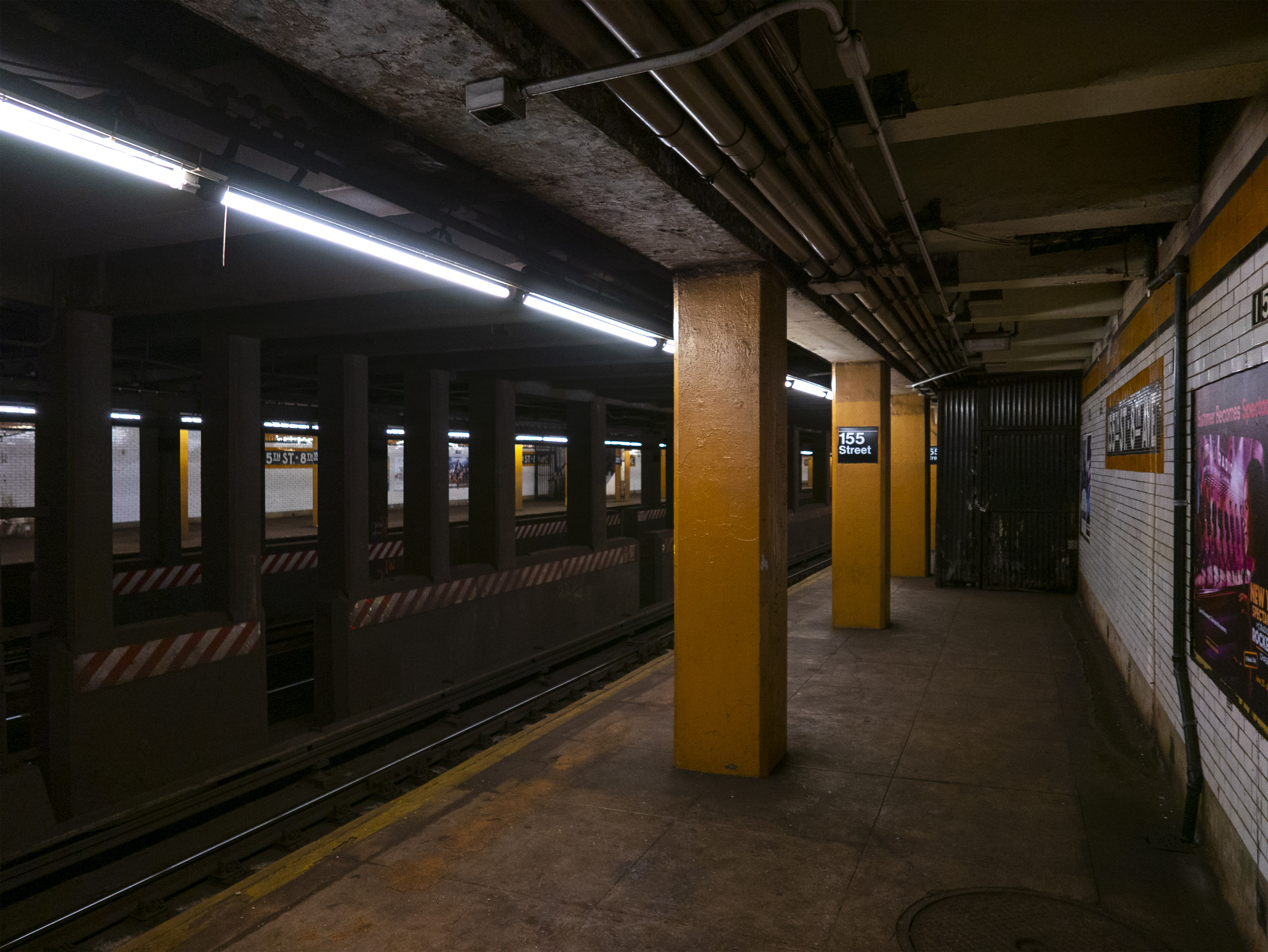
- Northbound platform

Station statistics
- Address: West 155th Street (lower level) & Frederick Douglass Boulevard; New York, New York
- Borough: Manhattan
- Locale: Harlem, and the Coogan's Bluff section of Washington Heights
- Coordinates: 40.829917°N 73.939104°W
- Division: B (IND)
- Line: IND Concourse Line
- Services: B (weekdays only); D (all except rush hours, peak direction)
- Transit: NYCT Bus: Bx6, Bx6 SBS, M2, M10
- Structure: Underground
- Platforms: 2 side platforms
- Tracks: 3

Other information
- Opened: July 1, 1933 (93 years ago)
- Former/other names: 155th Street–Eighth Avenue

Traffic
- 2025: 597,116 ▲6.9%
- Rank: 373 out of 423
Services
Preceding station	New York City Subway	Following station
161st Street–Yankee Stadium B D toward Norwood–205th Street	D (New York City Subway service)	145th Street B D toward Coney Island–Stillwell Avenue
Location
Location within New York City Subway
Location within New York City
Location within New York
Track layout
Street map
Station service legend
Symbol	Description
Stops all times except rush hours in the peak direction	Stops all times except rush hours in the peak direction
Stops rush hours only	Stops rush hours only
Stops weekdays during the day	Stops weekdays during the day

The 155th Street station (155th Street–Eighth Avenue on some signage) is a local station on the IND Concourse Line of the New York City Subway. It is located at the intersection of the bi-level 155th Street's lower level and Frederick Douglass Boulevard, at the border of Harlem and the Coogan's Bluff section of Washington Heights neighborhoods of Manhattan. It is served by the D train at all times except rush hours in the peak direction and the B weekdays only. The station opened in 1933, along with the rest of the Concourse Line.

== History ==
This station was built as part of the IND Concourse Line, which was one of the original lines of the city-owned Independent Subway System (IND). The route of the Concourse Line was approved to Bedford Park Boulevard on June 12, 1925 by the New York City Board of Transportation. Construction of the line began in July 1928. The station opened on July 1, 1933, along with the rest of the Concourse subway.

== Station layout ==
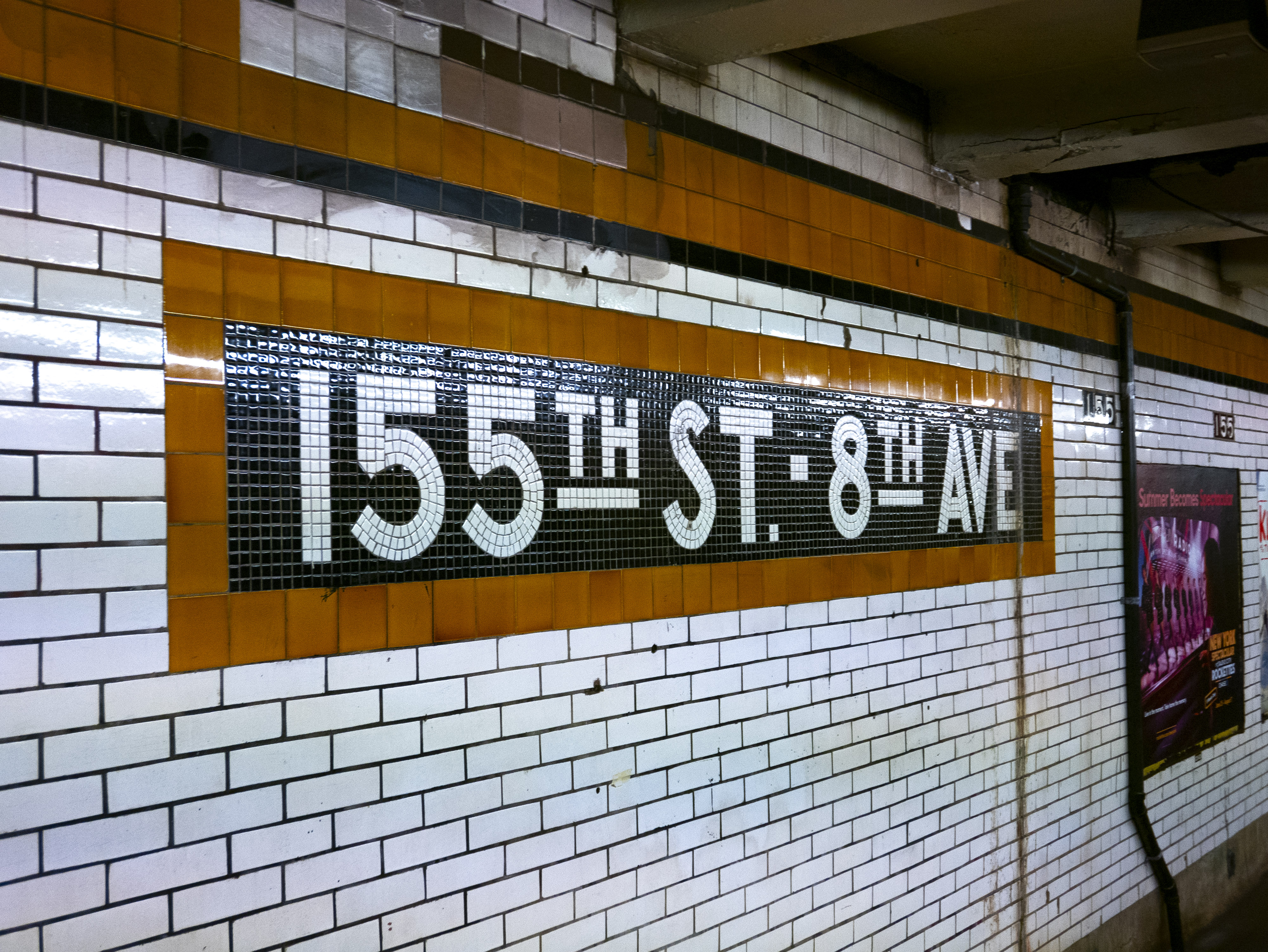
Name tablet mosaic

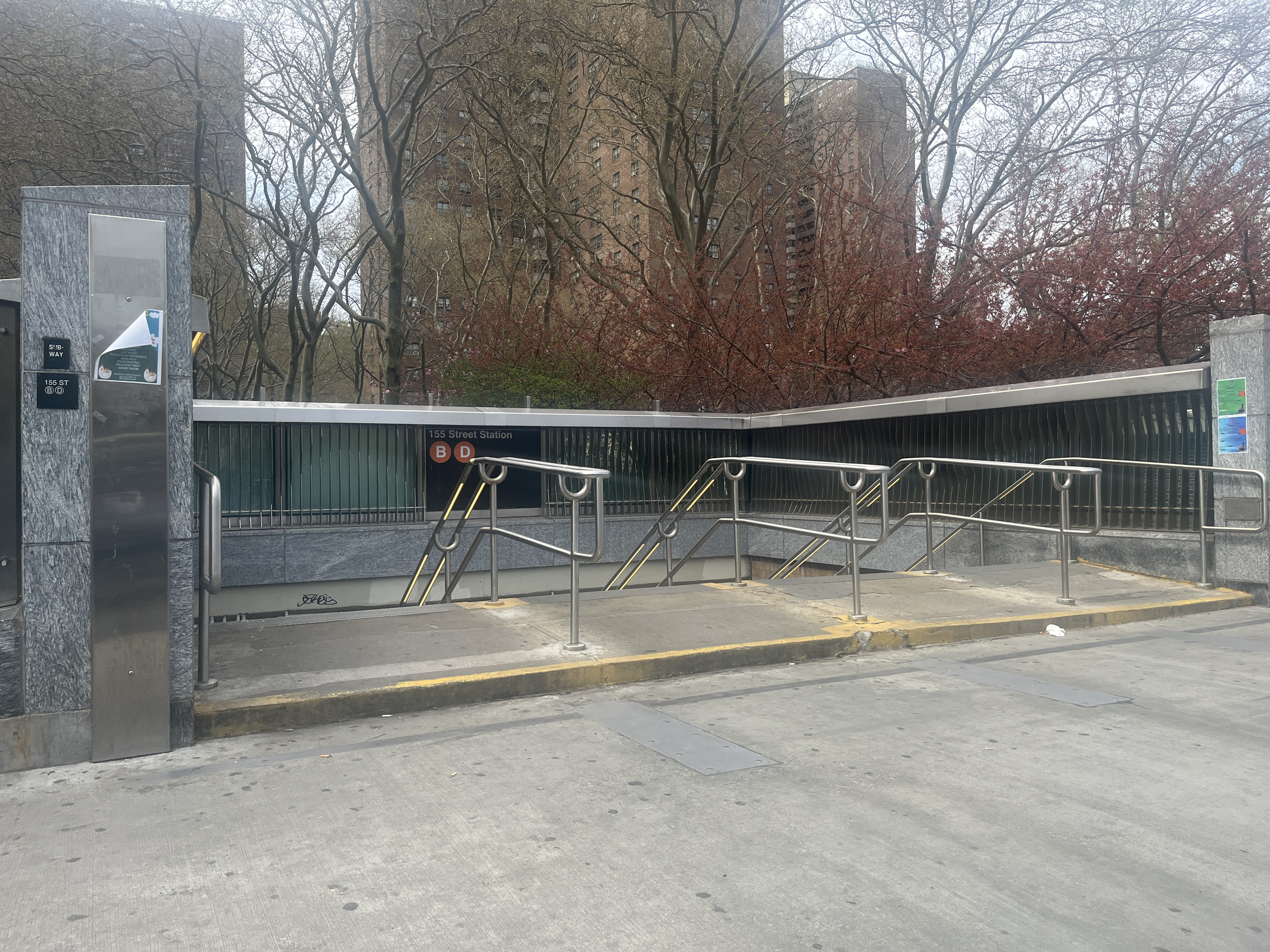
Staircase along Frederick Douglass Boulevard within the Polo Grounds Towers

This underground station has two side platforms and three tracks. The center track is used by the D express train during rush hours in the peak direction.

Both platforms have an orange trim line with a black border and mosaic name tablets reading "155TH ST. – 8TH AVE." in white sans-serif lettering on a black background with orange border. Small "155" and directional tile captions in white lettering on a black background run below the trim line and some of the mosaic name tablets. Orange-yellow I-beam columns run along both platforms at regular intervals, with alternating ones having the standard black name plate in white lettering.

The street staircase is wider than normal staircases, since the Polo Grounds stadium, home of the former New York Giants, was situated near the station, before the team left for San Francisco in 1958. The stadium was demolished in 1964 to make way for public housing after the New York Mets played there in 1962 and 1963. Today, Rucker Park is located at the entrance of the station.

An abandoned signal tower sits on the west end of the Brooklyn-bound platform. When the IRT Ninth Avenue Line and later the Polo Grounds Shuttle were in service, there was a provision for transfer tickets between the IND underground level and the IRT elevated shuttle level. A very steep walk was needed to make this transfer.

This is the only station in Manhattan that is served solely by the IND Concourse Line. To the east, the line continues under the Harlem River towards 161st Street–Yankee Stadium in the Bronx. To the west, the line turns south and continues under Saint Nicholas Place to a transfer station with the IND Eighth Avenue Line at 145th Street. South of 145th Street, the IND Concourse Line merges with the IND Eighth Avenue Line.

This station has a full-length mezzanine above the platforms. However, only the eastern end is open and has six staircases to the platforms. The Brooklyn-bound platform has four closed staircases while the Bronx-bound one has five. The mezzanine has yellow I-beam columns. The fare control area at the north end has a turnstile bank, token booth, and one exit-only turnstile on each side of the mezzanine.

=== Exit ===
A quadruple-wide staircase diagonal to the mezzanine that goes up to the west side of Frederick Douglass Boulevard between 155th Street and Harlem River Drive. The exit measures 28.5 feet (8.7 m) wide and 21 feet (6.4 m) deep. Three handrails separate the staircase into four "aisles". Originally, the stairway had an open cast-iron railing, similar to others in the New York City Subway system. Urbahn Architects redesigned the exit around 2020 to make it more resistant to flooding. The redesigned stair is surrounded on three sides by a glass flood wall, which rests on a concrete coping just above ground level and is held in place by steel posts placed every 4 feet (1.2 m). The entrance is flanked by pillars measuring 6.5 feet (2.0 m) high; a portable floodwall could be placed between the pillars during severe weather.
