= 155th Street (Manhattan) =

West-east street in Manhattan, New York

Coordinates: 40.8312°N 73.9422°W

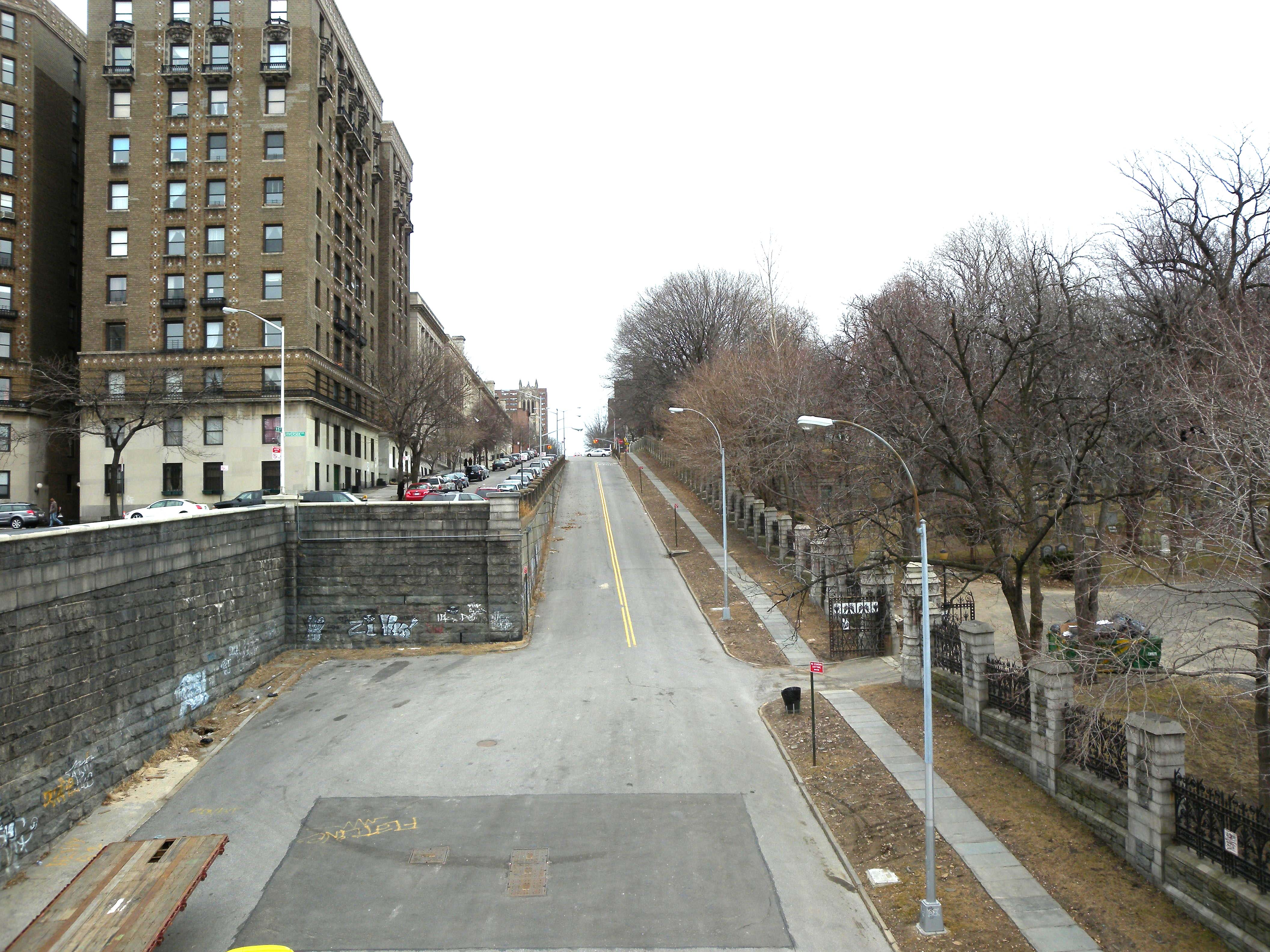
Western end of the upper portion of 155th Street, seen from Riverside Drive. The left roadway leads from Riverside Drive, while the right roadway descends under it.

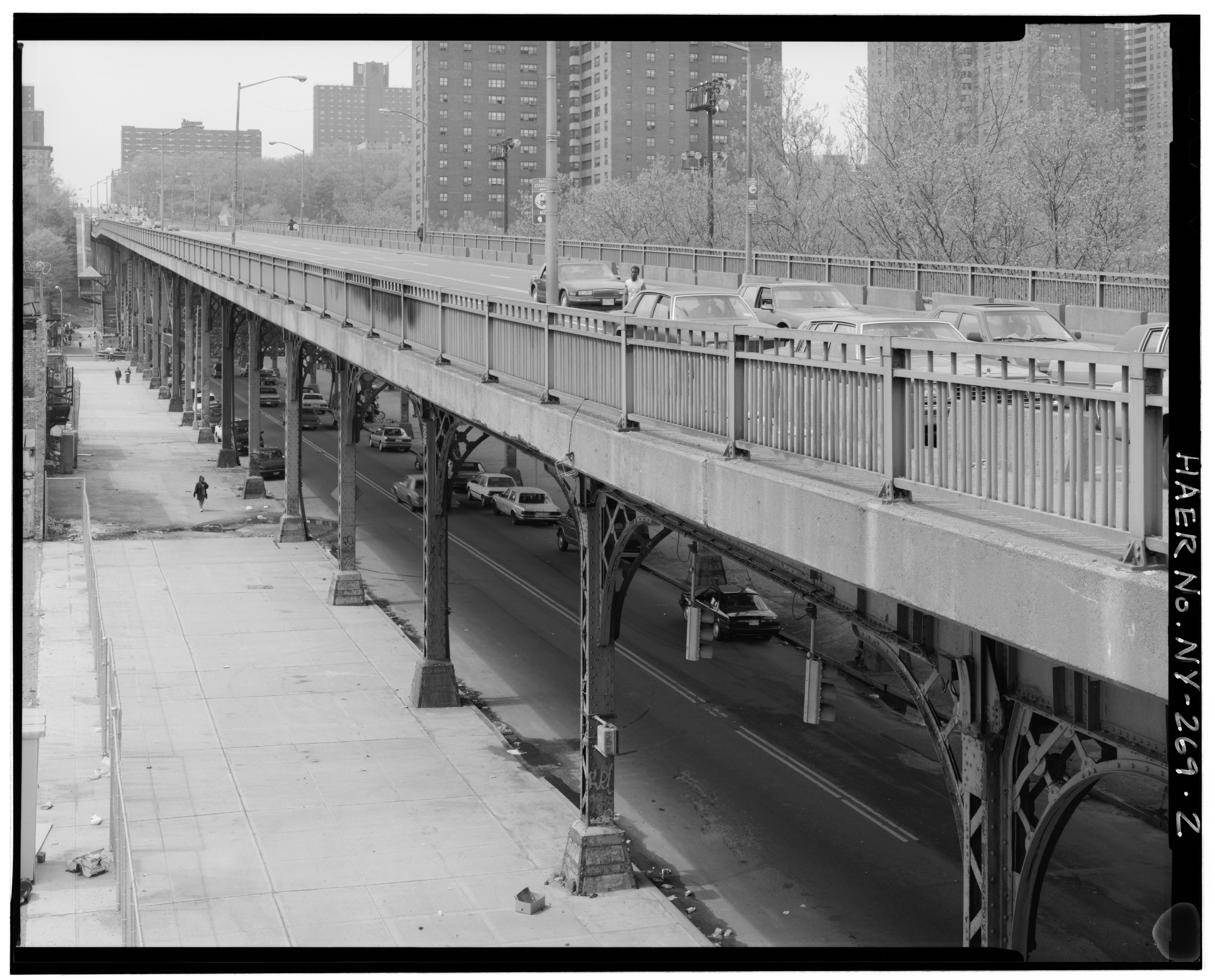
Eastern viaduct, pictured in 1994

155th Street is a crosstown street separating the Harlem and Washington Heights neighborhoods, in the New York City borough of Manhattan. It is the northernmost of the 155 crosstown streets mapped out in the Commissioner's Plan of 1811 that established the numbered street grid in Manhattan.

The street consists of upper and lower portions, linked only by a steep pedestrian stairwell. The upper portion starts on the West Side at Riverside Drive, crossing Broadway, Amsterdam Avenue, and St. Nicholas Avenue. At St. Nicholas Place, the terrain drops off steeply, forming Coogan's Bluff. 155th Street is carried on the 1,600-foot (490 m) long 155th Street Viaduct, a City Landmark constructed in 1893, that slopes down towards the Harlem River, continuing onto the Macombs Dam Bridge, crossing over (but not intersecting with) the Harlem River Drive. An unconnected lower section of 155th Street runs at ground level under the viaduct, between a dead-end west of Bradhurst Avenue and a service road of the Harlem River Drive.

== Transportation ==
The New York City Subway serves the upper portion of 155th Street at 155th Street/St. Nicholas Avenue on the IND Eighth Avenue Line and the lower portion at 155th Street/Frederick Douglass Boulevard on the IND Concourse Line.

Bus service is provided by the Bx6 and Bx6 SBS east of Broadway, the M2 east of Edgecombe Avenue, and the M3 between Amsterdam and Saint Nicholas Avenues, all under New York City Bus.

== Points of interest ==
- Highbridge Park – situated on the banks of the Harlem River near the northernmost tip of Manhattan, between 155th Street and Dyckman Street.
- Polo Grounds – The second and third (final) incarnations of the famed stadium were located at what was then 8th Avenue from 1889 to 1963, in Coogan's Hollow on the north side of the viaduct. Over its life, it was home of the New York Giants (1889–1957), New York Yankees (1913–1922) and New York Mets (1962–1963) baseball franchises, and the New York Giants (1925–1955) and New York Jets (1960–1963) football teams.
- Rucker Park – located at Frederick Douglass Boulevard, Rucker Park is one of the premier havens of streetball, and its summer league has been the launching point for many NBA players.
- Hispanic Society of America – Museum of Spanish, Portuguese, and Latin American art and artifacts, as well as a rare books and manuscripts and research library, located at Audubon Terrace.
- Trinity Church Cemetery and Mausoleum, on the south side of 155th between Broadway and Riverside Drive.
