= Third Avenue Bridge (New York City) =

Bridge between Manhattan and the Bronx, New York

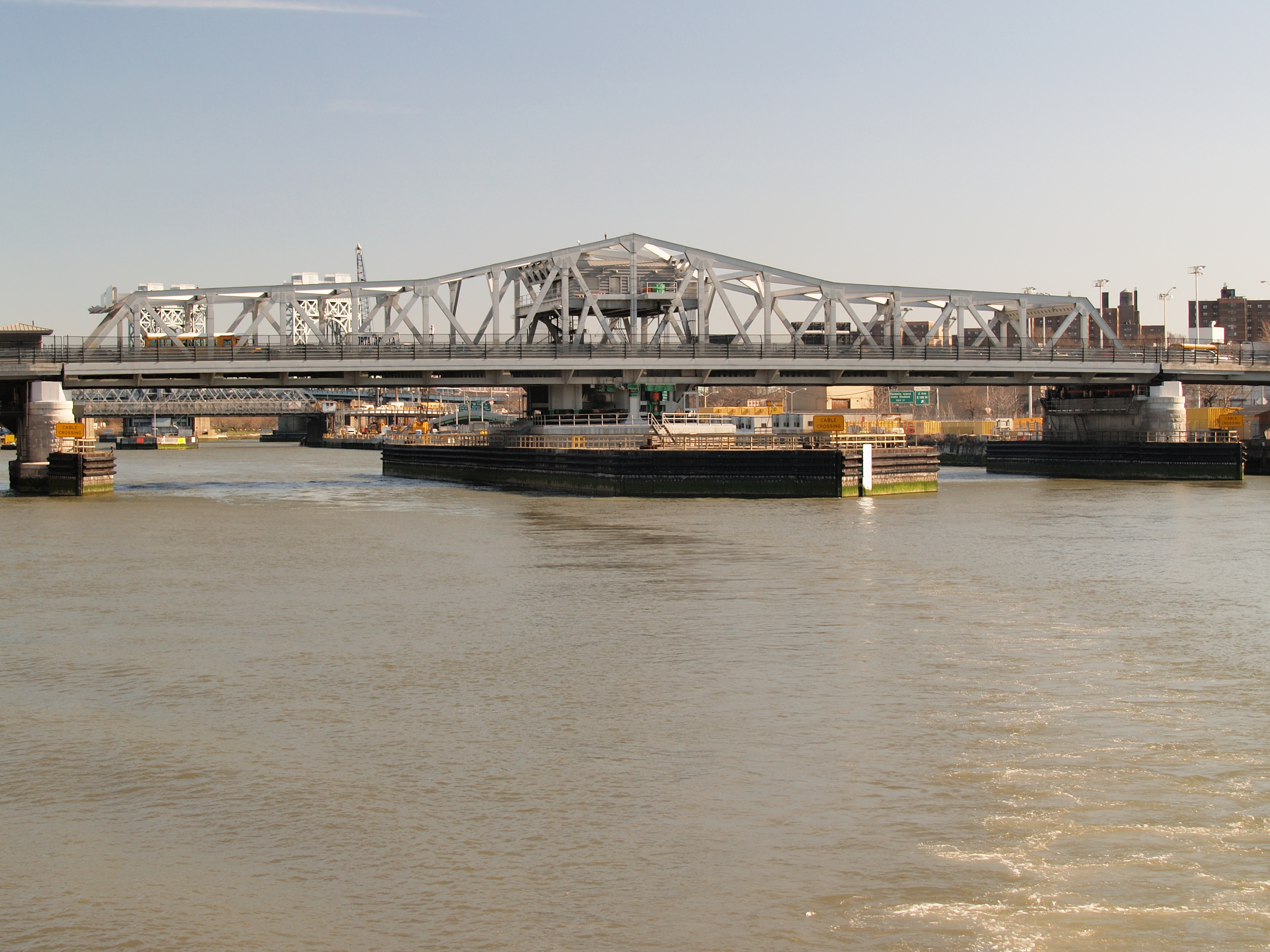
- From the south
- Coordinates: 40.8076°N 73.9325°W
- Carries: 5 lanes of Third Avenue
- Crosses: Harlem River
- Locale: Manhattan and the Bronx, New York City
- Other name: 3rd Avenue Bridge
- Owner: City of New York
- Maintained by: NYCDOT
- Preceded by: Madison Avenue Bridge
- Followed by: Willis Avenue Bridge

Characteristics
- Design: Swing bridge
- Total length: 2,800 feet (853.44 m)
- Longest span: 300 feet (91.44 m)

History
- Construction cost: $119 million
- Opened: August 1, 1898; 128 years ago
- Rebuilt: December 6, 2004; 21 years ago

Statistics
- Daily traffic: 55,096 (2016)

Location
- Interactive map of Third Avenue Bridge

The Third Avenue Bridge is a swing bridge that carries southbound road traffic on Third Avenue over the Harlem River, connecting the boroughs of Manhattan and the Bronx in New York City. It once carried southbound New York State Route 1A. On the Manhattan side, the bridge funnels traffic into three locations: East 128th Street; the intersection of East 129th Street and Lexington Avenue; or FDR Drive in Manhattan.

The bridge was formerly bidirectional, but converted to one-way operation southbound on August 5, 1941, on the same day the Willis Avenue Bridge was similarly converted to one-way northbound. In 1955, the original multi-truss bridge constructed in 1898 was removed and sold. A rebuilt bridge reopened in December 1956.

== Reconstruction ==
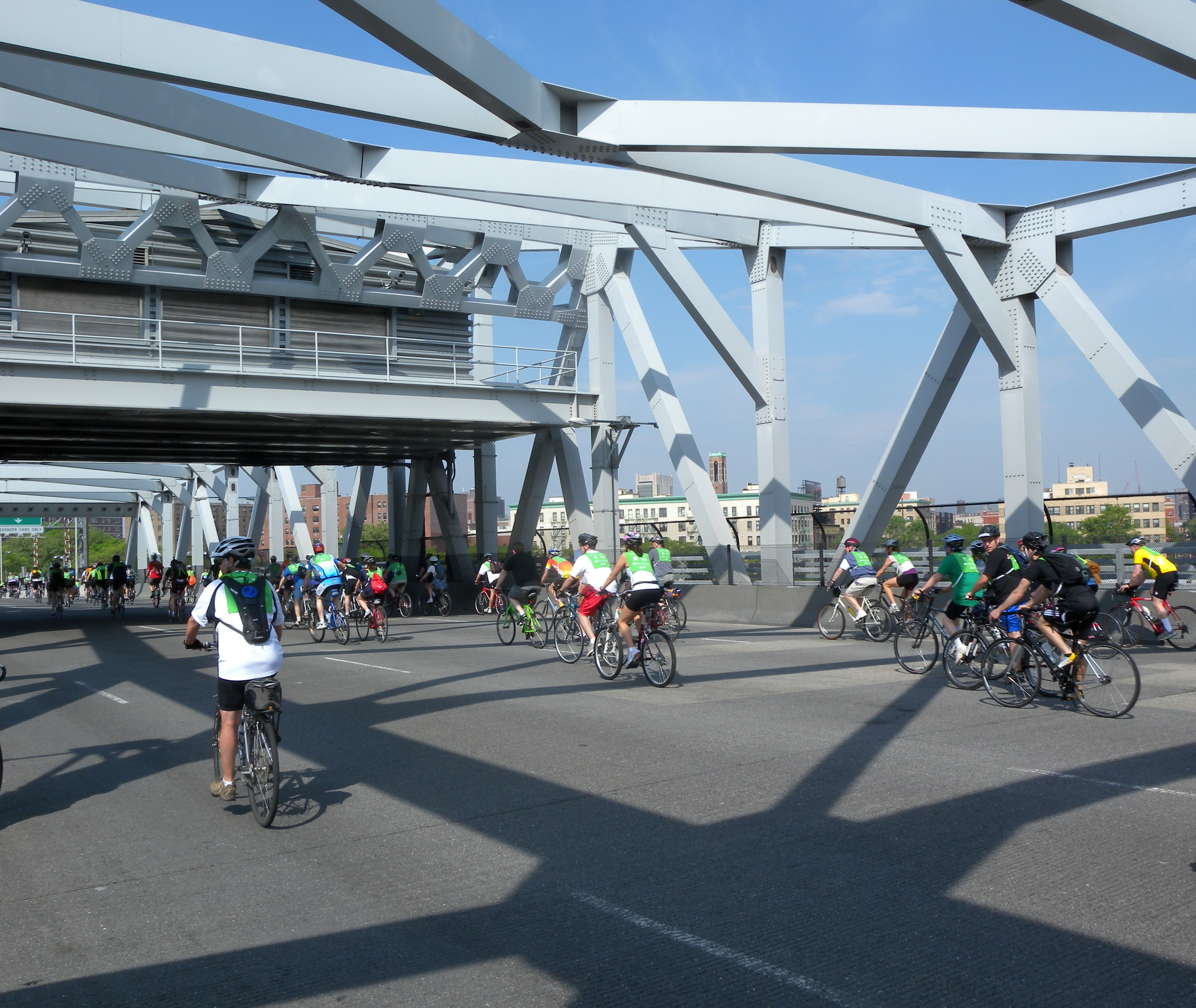
Bicyclists on the new bridge in 2010

As part of a major NYCDOT reconstruction project from 2001 to 2005, a new swing span was floated into place on October 29, 2004. Two lanes of Manhattan-bound traffic opened on December 6, 2004, and the remaining three lanes opened in 2005. In addition to replacing the swing span and its machinery, the project included redesigned approach ramps to the bridge on the Bronx side and off the bridge in Manhattan. As reconstructed, the Third Avenue Bridge carries five lanes of Manhattan-bound traffic from the Bronx, which split to three ramps in Manhattan: to East 128th Street and Second Avenue; to Lexington Avenue and East 129th Street; and to FDR Drive.

For 2011, the New York City Department of Transportation, which operates and maintains the bridge, reported an average daily traffic volume of 59,603; the bridge reached a peak ADT of 73,121 in 2000. Between 2000 and 2014, the bridge opened for vessels 93 times, including 60 times in 2007.

On July 8, 2024, during the 2024 North America heat waves, the bridge suffered from heat expansion and got stuck in the open position, so vehicles could not cross it. The New York City Fire Department sprayed water onto the bridge to cool it down.

== Public transportation ==
The Third Avenue Bridge carries the M125 bus route operated by MTA New York City Transit. The route's average weekday ridership is 19,951.

== TV documentary ==
Discovery Channel contracted Barner-Alper Productions of Toronto to produce an episode of Mega-Builders, titled "Spanning the Harlem", about the work leading up to the float-in of the swing span. It first aired in 2005 in Canada on Discovery Canada.
