= Willis Avenue Bridge =

Bridge between Manhattan and the Bronx, New York

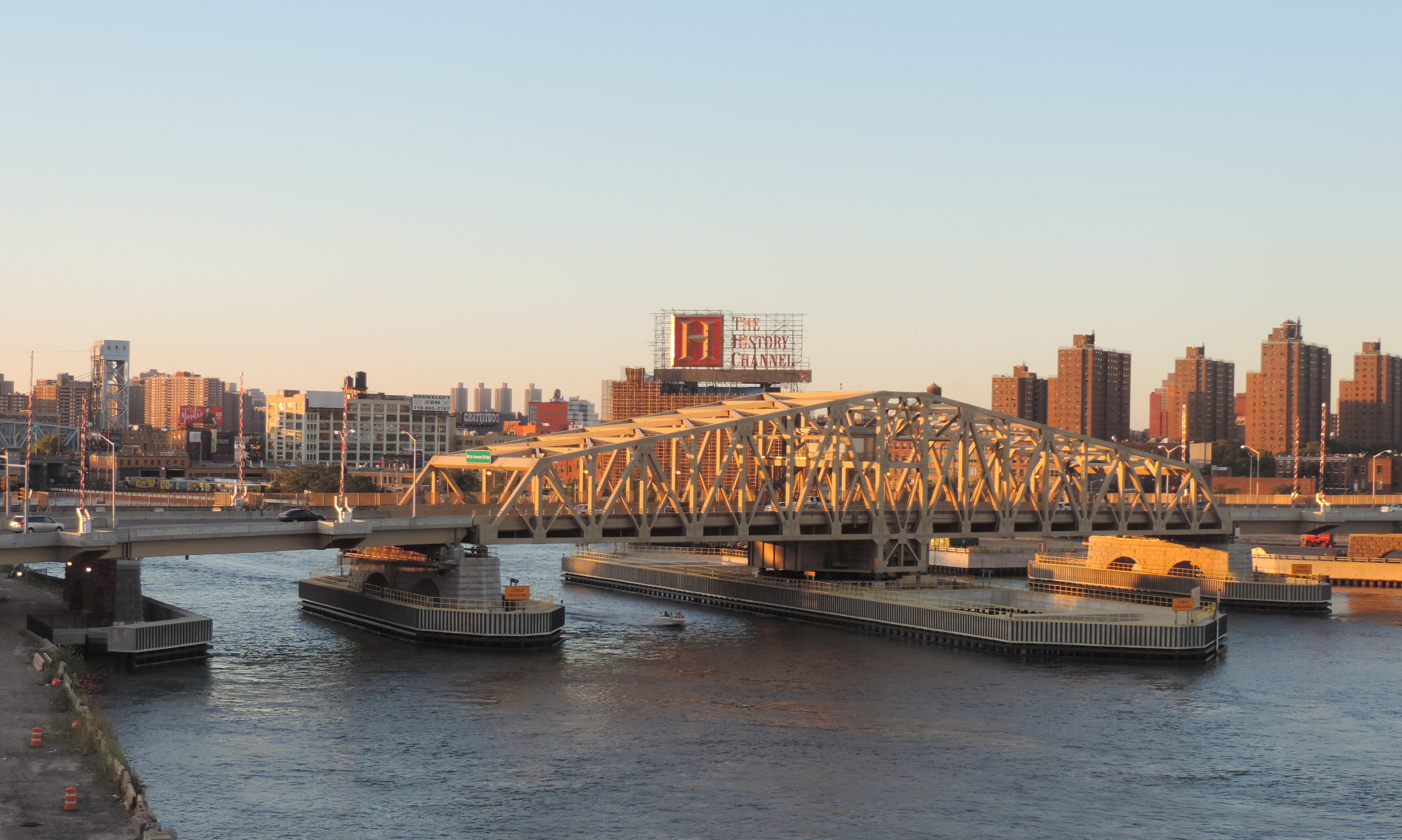
- Coordinates: 40°48′13″N 73°55′45″W
- Carries: 4 lanes of roadway
- Crosses: Harlem River
- Locale: Manhattan and the Bronx, New York City
- Owner: City of New York
- Maintained by: NYCDOT
- Preceded by: Third Avenue Bridge
- Followed by: Robert F. Kennedy Bridge

Characteristics
- Design: Swing bridge
- Total length: 3,212 feet (979.02 m)
- Longest span: 304 feet (92.66 m)

History
- Construction cost: $278.4 million
- Opened: August 22, 1901
- Rebuilt: October 2, 2010

Statistics
- Daily traffic: 62,293 (2016)

Location
- Interactive map of Willis Avenue Bridge

The Willis Avenue Bridge is a swing bridge that carries road traffic northbound (and bicycles and pedestrians both ways) over the Harlem River between the New York City boroughs of Manhattan and the Bronx, United States. It connects First Avenue in Manhattan with Willis Avenue in the Bronx. The New York City Department of Transportation is responsible for maintaining and operating the bridge.

The bridge is part of the course for the annual New York City Marathon. The runners, after crossing over from Manhattan to The Bronx via the bridge (which has been dubbed "the wall" because it marks the 20-mile point on the run) then follow a short course through the borough and return to Manhattan for the race's final leg via the Madison Avenue Bridge.

Between 2000 and 2014, the bridge opened for vessels 214 times.

== History ==
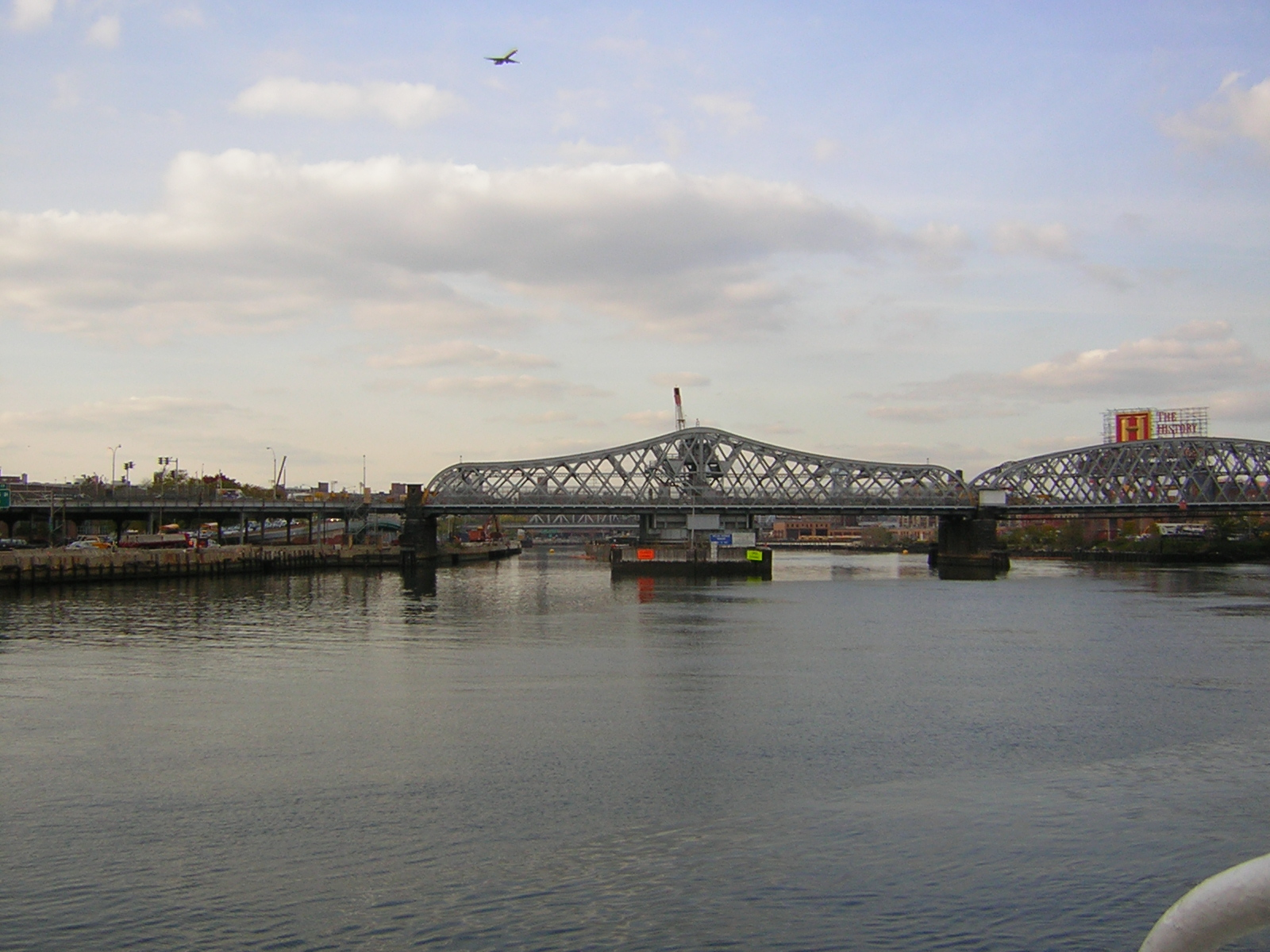
Old bridge, opened August 22, 1901

The bridge opened in 1901, at an original construction cost of $1,640,523.11 and a land cost of $803,988.37. It consisted of a swing span, and a fixed truss span.

In 1907, a ramp with Bruckner Boulevard was opened to traffic. In 1915, the city government gave the Union Railway Company permission to construct trolley tracks over the bridge. After work to retrofit the bridge to carry heavy trolley cars, the tracks were completed on April 5, 1916. In 1936, the ramp with Harlem River Drive was opened. The bridge was converted to a one-way northbound roadway on August 5, 1941, the same day the Third Avenue Bridge was converted to one-way southbound. The trolley tracks were also replaced by vehicular lanes.

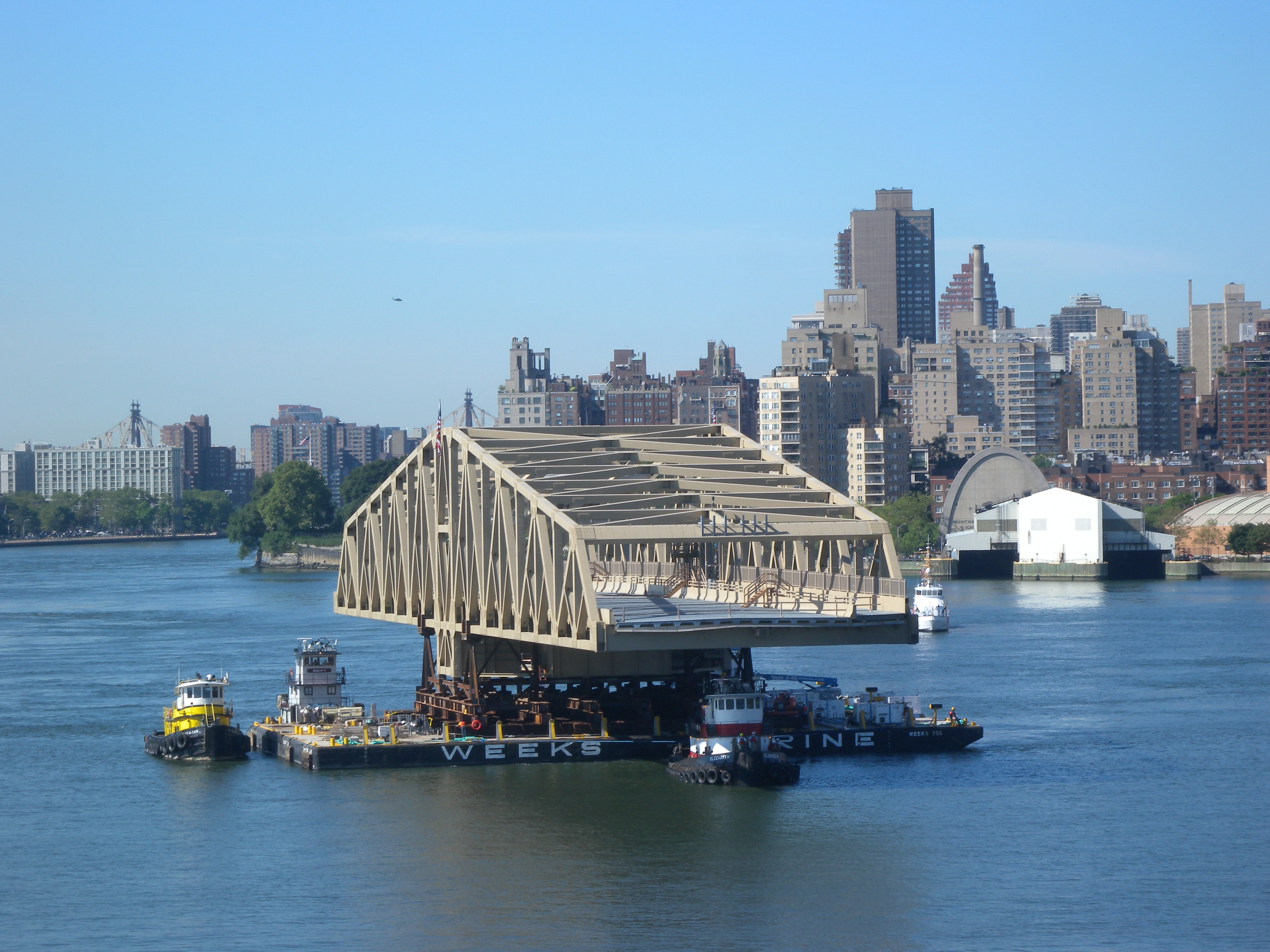
Replacement bridge sails up East River, July 2010

In November 2005, New York City sought to replace the bridge. In an effort to preserve the structure, the city offered it for sale for $1, with free delivery within 15 miles. Due to the difficult logistics of moving the structure, there were no bids by March 2007. Due to its poor condition, the bridge was replaced starting in 2007 and converted to pedestrian-only traffic for three years, and then was dismantled once a sidewalk was put in on the new bridge. On April 12, 2011, granite from the structure was given to a nearby park while the metal part was moved via tug to Jersey City. The steel was melted down and the concrete parts were made into fill.

The Department of Transportation opted to construct a new structure to the south of the existing bridge at a projected cost of $417 million. On March 8, 2007, when bidding for construction was opened, of the two bids offered, the lowest came in at $612 million. Iris Weinshall, the department commissioner, said that the city had to go forward with the project because maintenance of the existing bridge was too expensive and the design of the ramps contributed to frequent accidents. This was the most costly bridge construction project by the New York City Department of Transportation. Weinshall expected the project to last five years with construction beginning around the end of 2007.

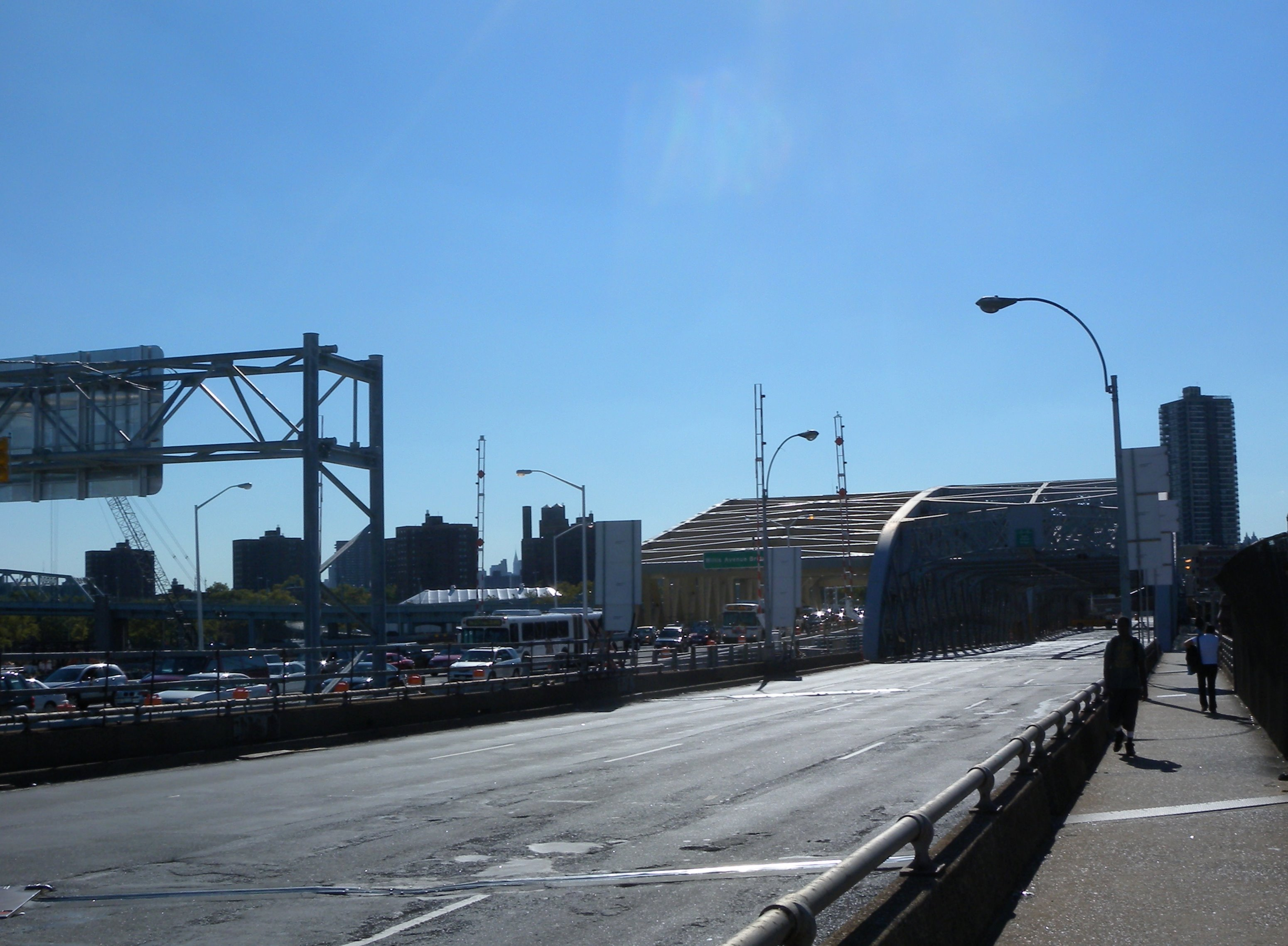
Motor traffic shifted to new bridge on October 2, 2010

The replacement bridge was constructed at Port of Coeymans, 10 miles south of Albany. On July 13, 2010, the bridge was shipped down the Hudson on two barges that were welded together. The new bridge is 350 feet long, 65 feet high and 77 feet wide; it required three tugboats to propel it. The sight of the floating bridge caused a stir among onlookers all along the Hudson. After a stay at Port Jersey in Jersey City it was towed up the East River to its destination in the morning on July 26. Motor traffic was shifted to the new bridge on October 2, 2010, though the walkway of the old bridge continued to serve pedestrians and cyclists for a few weeks.

Just upstream, the Third Avenue Bridge carries southbound traffic across the Harlem River from the Bronx to Manhattan as the other side of a one-way pair. That bridge was replaced in 2004.

== In popular culture ==
"Willis Avenue Bridge" is the name of a song by David Berkeley from his 2009 album Strange Light.

"Beneath the Willis Bridge" is the name of the 2015 album released by 80 REEF.

In a famous publicity photo for the film Midnight Cowboy, Joe Buck and Ratso Rizzo (Jon Voight and Dustin Hoffman) are seen walking on the old Willis Avenue Bridge.

== Public transportation ==
The Willis Avenue Bridge carries the M125 bus route operated by MTA New York City Transit. The route's average weekday ridership is 19,951.
