= Madison Avenue Bridge =

Bridge between Manhattan and the Bronx, New York

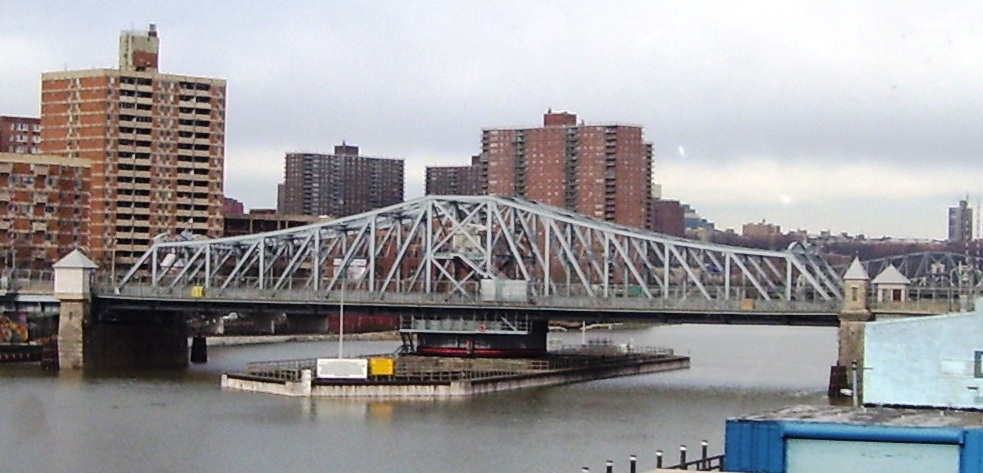
- South side, from a Metro North train
- Coordinates: 40°48′51″N 73°56′00″W
- Carries: 4 lanes of East 138th Street
- Crosses: Harlem River
- Locale: Manhattan and the Bronx, New York City
- Owner: City of New York
- Maintained by: NYCDOT
- Preceded by: 145th Street Bridge
- Followed by: Third Avenue Bridge

Characteristics
- Design: Swing bridge
- Total length: 1,892 feet (576.68 m)
- Longest span: 300 feet (91.44 m)

History
- Construction cost: $90.5 million
- Opened: July 18, 1910

Statistics
- Daily traffic: 44,338 (2016)

Location
- Interactive map of Madison Avenue Bridge

The Madison Avenue Bridge is a four-lane swing bridge crossing the Harlem River in New York City, carrying East 138th Street between the boroughs of Manhattan and the Bronx. It was designed by Alfred P. Boller and built in 1910, doubling the capacity of an earlier swing bridge built in 1884. The bridge is operated and maintained by the New York City Department of Transportation.

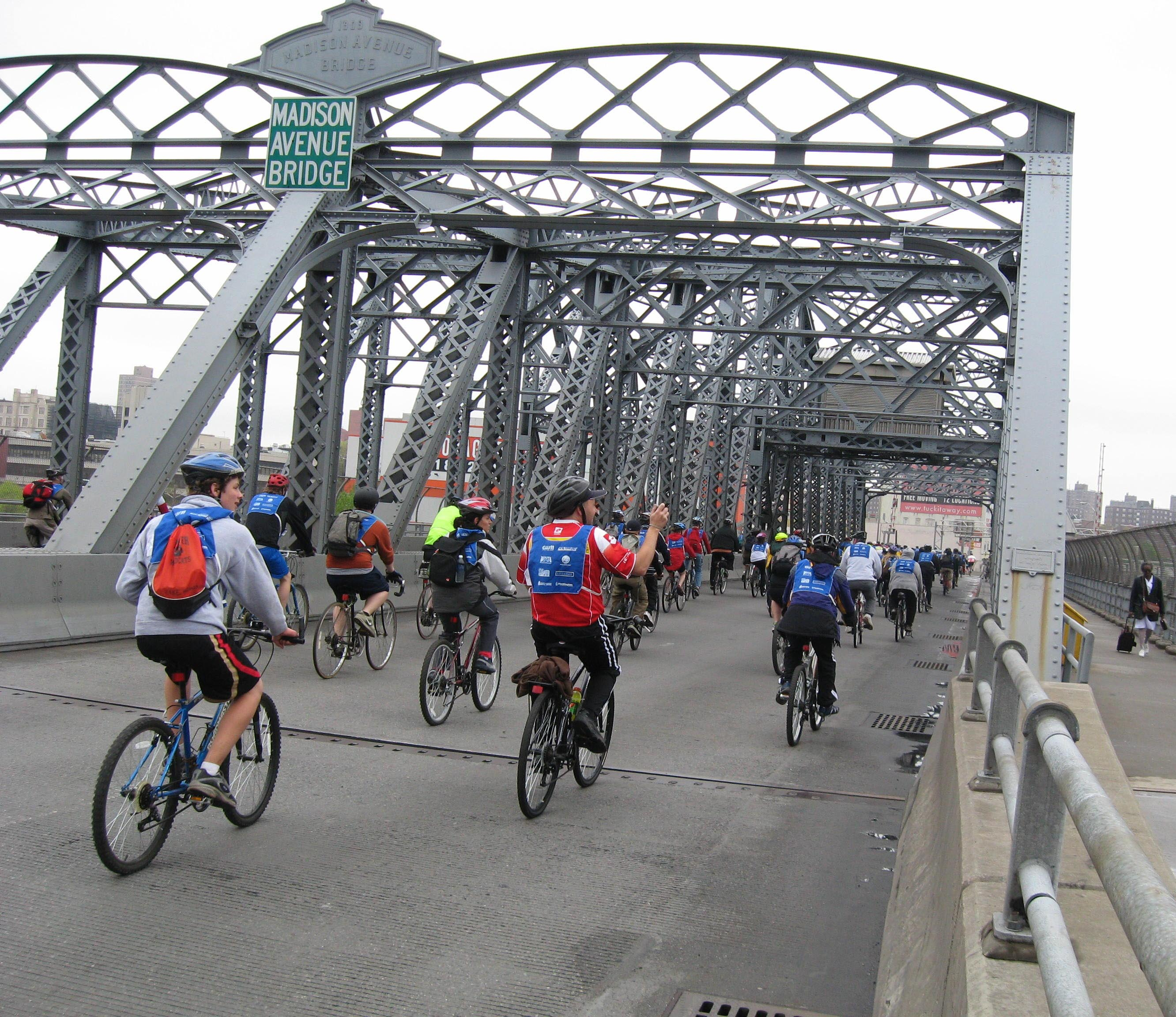
Bicyclists crossing the bridge during the Five Boro Bike Tour

For 2011, the NYCDOT reported an average daily traffic volume in both directions of 41,423; having reached a peak of 49,487 in 2002. Between 2000 and 2014, the bridge opened for vessels 69 times.

== Events ==
The bridge is part of the course for the annual New York City Marathon. The runners cross from Manhattan to the Bronx via the Willis Avenue Bridge, follow a short course through the South Bronx, and then return to Manhattan for the race's final leg via the Madison Avenue Bridge.

== Public transportation ==
The Madison Avenue Bridge carries the Bx33 local bus route operated by MTA New York City Transit, the BxM3 and BxM4 express bus routes operated by the MTA Bus Company, and the BxM4C express bus route operated by Westchester County's Bee-Line Bus System.
