= Harlem River =

Tidal strait in New York City

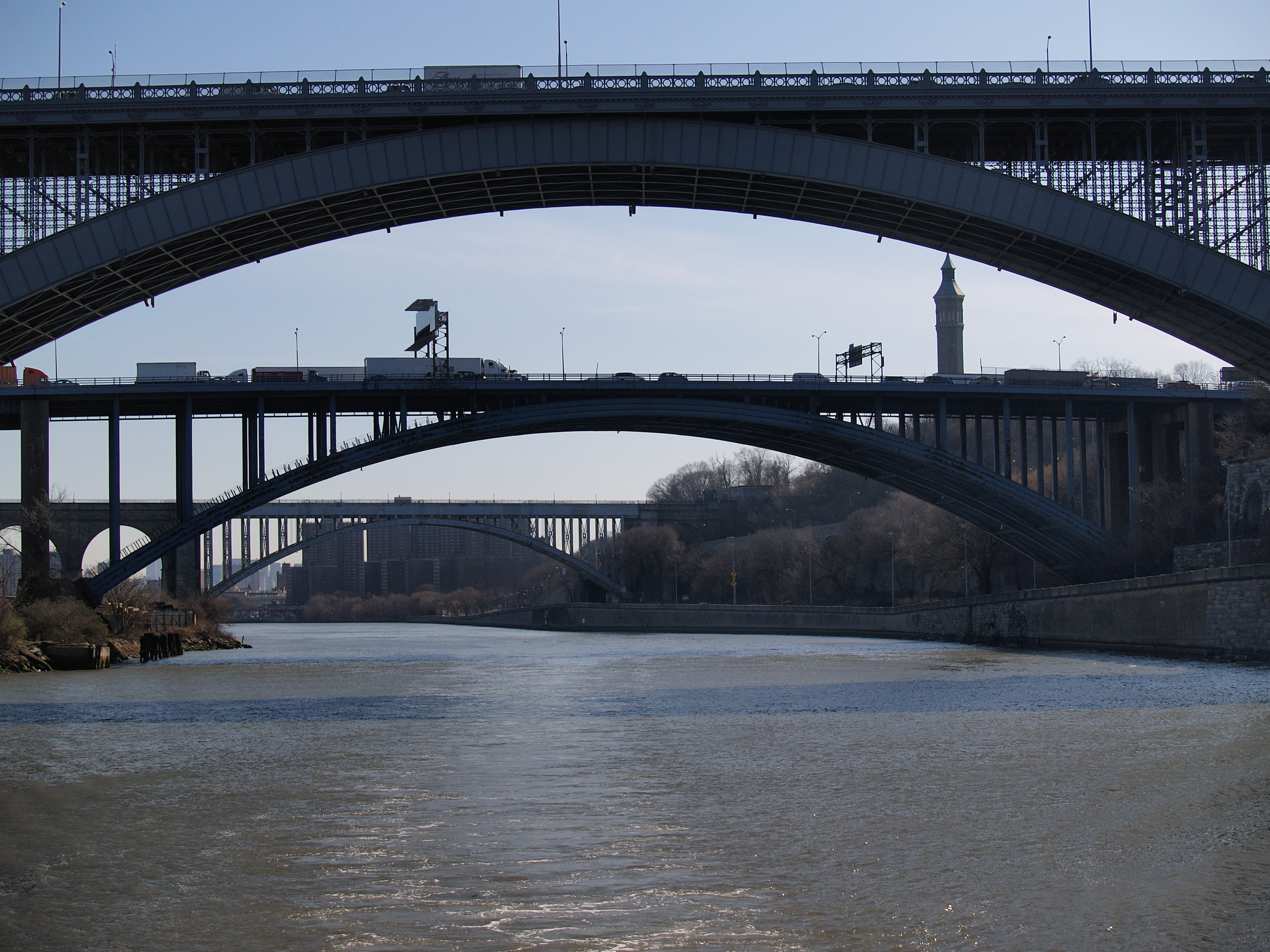
- The Washington, Alexander Hamilton, and High Bridges over the Harlem River

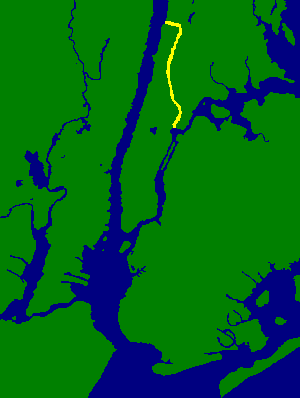
- The Harlem River, shown in yellow, between the Bronx and Manhattan in New York City.

Location
- Country: United States
- State: New York
- Municipality: New York City

Physical characteristics
- Source: Hudson River
  - coordinates: 40.87843°N 73.92594°W
- Mouth: East River
  - coordinates: 40.78003°N 73.93710°W
- Length: 8 mi (13 km)

Basin features
- Tributaries
  - left: Bronx Kill

The Harlem River is an 8-mile (13 km) tidal strait in New York City, flowing between the Hudson River and the East River. It separates the island of Manhattan from the Bronx on the United States mainland.

The northern stretch, also called the Spuyten Duyvil Creek, has been significantly altered for navigation purposes. Originally it curved around the north of Marble Hill, but in 1895 the Harlem Ship Canal was dug between Manhattan and Marble Hill, and in 1914 the original course was filled in.

== Use ==
Harlem River Drive and Harlem River Greenway run along the west bank of the river, and the Metro-North Railroad's Hudson Line and Major Deegan Expressway on the east.

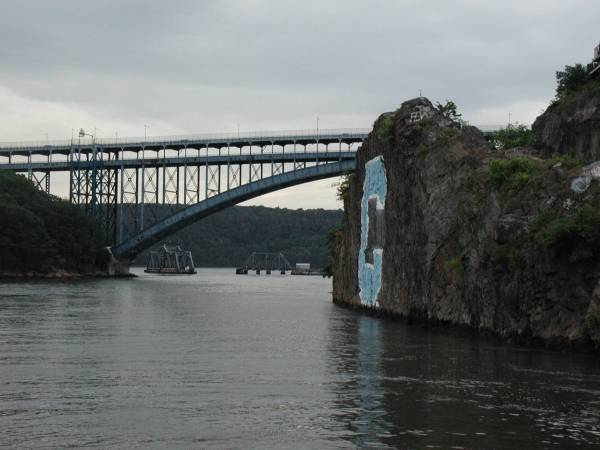
The "C" Rock, with the Henry Hudson Bridge behind it and the Spuyten Duyvil Bridge in the distance in the open position.

The Harlem River was the traditional rowing course for New York, analogous to the Charles River in Boston and the Schuylkill River in Philadelphia. On the Harlem's banks is the boathouse for the Columbia University crew, and the river is the home course for the university's crew. Since 1952, a large flat rock face, called the "(Big) C Rock" has been painted with Columbia's varsity "C". Also on the river are the Peter Jay Sharp Boathouse and Harlem River Community Rowing, two community rowing facilities. The river is used by crews from New York University, Fordham University, and Manhattan University, though the only university with permanent facilities on the river is Columbia.

Historically, the west bank of the Harlem River was also an amusement destination. The area between 190th and 192nd Streets was occupied by the Fort George Amusement Park, a trolley park/amusement park, from 1895 to 1914. Its site is now a seating area in Highbridge Park. In the 1890s, the City of New York built a racetrack for horses, the Harlem River Speedway, along the riverbank of the park; the project started construction in 1894 and opened in July 1898. The Speedway later became the Harlem River Drive, and regular motorists were first allowed on the drive in 1919.

== Crossings ==
The Harlem River is spanned by seven swing bridges, four lift bridges, and four arch bridges, and is navigable to any boat with less than 55 feet (17 m) of air draft. However, any boat requiring more than 5 feet (1.5 m) of clearance will require the Spuyten Duyvil Bridge to swing open. All other movable bridges on the Harlem River provide at least 24 feet (7.3 m) of clearance while closed, so boats and ships requiring between 5 and 24 feet (1.5 and 7.3 m) of clearance need only have one bridge swing open. These bridges replaced fixed bridges or lower bridges in the late 19th century to improve navigation. High Bridge was erected between 1837 and 1848 to carry the Croton Aqueduct across the river. It is the oldest bridge in New York City.

The New York City Department of Transportation advises that while they make every effort to ensure that all bridges are operating, many of them are under repair at any time, and outside contractors are responsible for opening of bridges under repair.

Crossing	Image	Carries	Location	Coordinates
Wards Island Bridge	Top: closed position bottom: open position	Pedestrian/bicycle	Manhattan and Wards Island	40.7861°N 73.9371°W
Robert F. Kennedy Triboro Lift Bridge (Harlem Lift Bridge)		NY State Route 900G (6 road lanes)	Manhattan and Randall's Island	40.8003°N 73.9278°W
Willis Avenue Bridge	1901 Bridge 2010 Bridge Top: 1901 bridge; bottom: 2010 bridge	Northbound auto traffic; Pedestrian/bicycle	Manhattan and the Bronx	40.8035°N 73.9289°W
Third Avenue Bridge		Southbound auto traffic; Pedestrian/bicycle	Manhattan and the Bronx	40.8076°N 73.9325°W
Lexington Avenue Tunnel		IRT Lexington Avenue Line ( trains)	Manhattan and the Bronx	40.8095°N 73.9332°W
Park Avenue Bridge		Metro-North Railroad	Manhattan and the Bronx	40.8111°N 73.9333°W
Madison Avenue Bridge		Southbound/eastbound auto traffic; pedestrian/bicycle	Manhattan and the Bronx	40.8115°N 73.9327°W
149th Street Tunnel		IRT White Plains Road Line ( train)	Manhattan and the Bronx	40.8189°N 73.9331°W
145th Street Bridge		Westbound/eastbound auto traffic; pedestrian/bicycle	Manhattan and the Bronx	40.8195°N 73.9331°W
Macombs Dam Bridge		Westbound/eastbound auto traffic; pedestrian/bicycle	Manhattan and the Bronx	40.8281°N 73.9339°W
Concourse Tunnel		IND Concourse Line ( trains)	Manhattan and the Bronx	40.8306°N 73.9341°W
Putnam Bridge (1881–1960)		Ninth Avenue El	Manhattan and the Bronx	40.8322°N 73.9343°W
High Bridge		Pedestrian	Manhattan and the Bronx	40.8423°N 73.9303°W
Alexander Hamilton Bridge		Interstate 95; U.S. Route 1	Manhattan and the Bronx	40.8456°N 73.9287°W
Washington Bridge		Westbound/eastbound auto traffic; pedestrian/bicycle	Manhattan and the Bronx	40.8469°N 73.9281°W
University Heights Bridge		Westbound/eastbound auto traffic; pedestrian/bicycle	Manhattan and the Bronx	40.8628°N 73.9150°W
Broadway Bridge		US 9 IRT Broadway – Seventh Avenue Line ( train)	Manhattan Island and Marble Hill, Manhattan	40.8736°N 73.9111°W
Henry Hudson Bridge		NY 9A; Henry Hudson Parkway	Manhattan and the Bronx	40.8779°N 73.9218°W
Spuyten Duyvil Bridge		Amtrak Empire Connection	Manhattan and the Bronx	40.8783°N 73.9256°W

== See also ==
- Geography of New York City
- Geography of New York Harbor
- List of New York rivers
