= Macombs Dam Park =

Public park in the Bronx, New York

Coordinates: 40.828091°N 73.929448°W

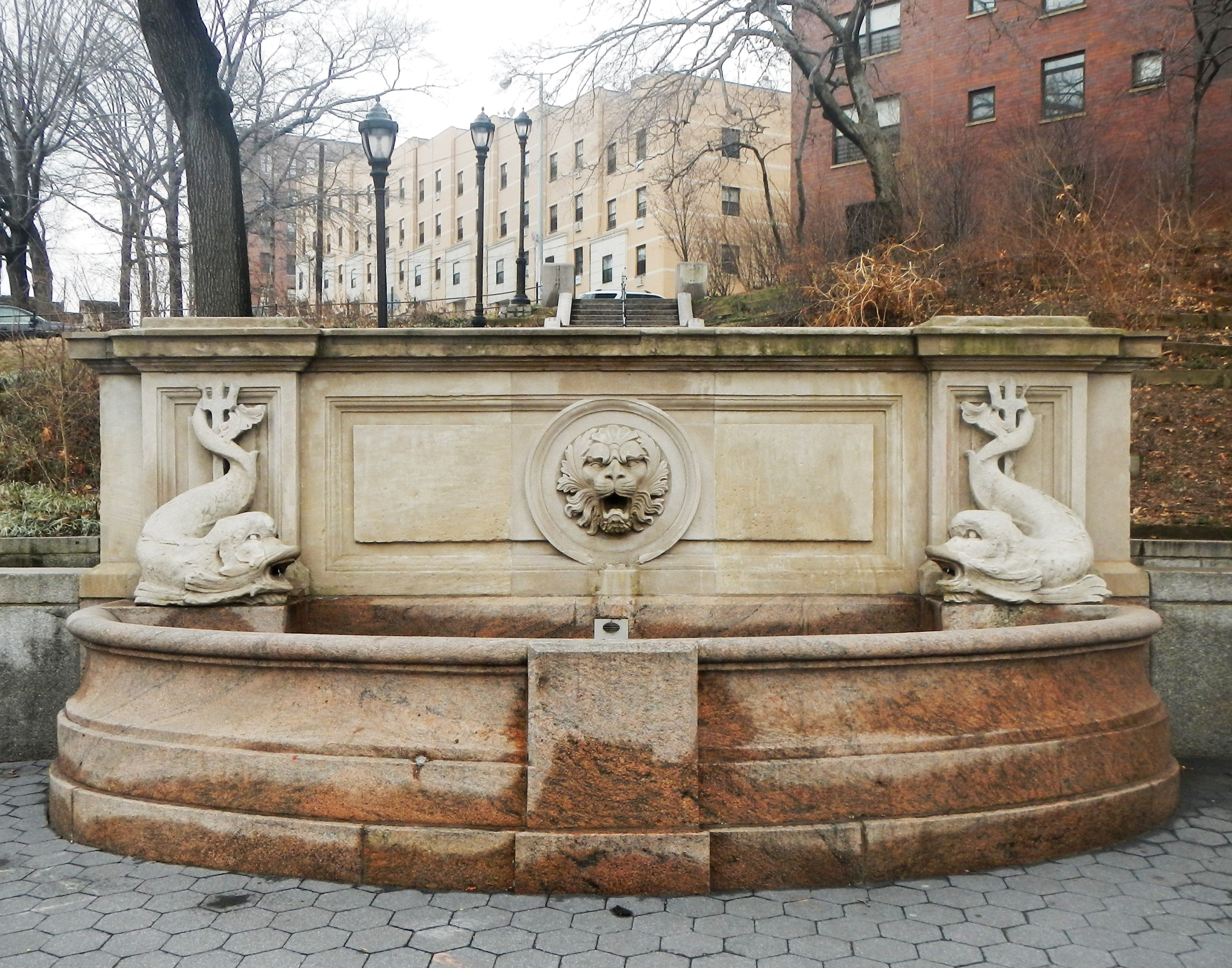
Lion fountain in northern part of the park

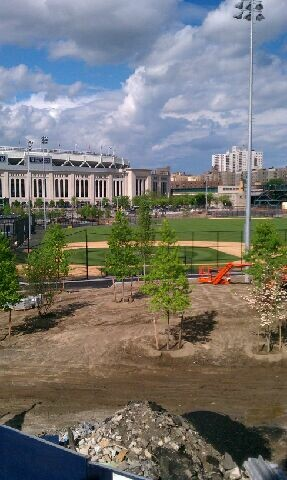
Heritage Field under construction in Macombs Dam Park

Macombs Dam Park (/məˈkuːmz/ mə-KOOMZ) is a park in the Concourse section of the Bronx, New York City. The park lay in the shadow of the old Yankee Stadium when it stood, between Jerome Avenue and the Major Deegan Expressway, near the Harlem River and the Macombs Dam Bridge. The park is administered and maintained by the New York City Department of Parks and Recreation. The majority of Macombs Dam Park was not open to the public from August 2006, when construction began on the new Yankee Stadium, to April 2012.

The 28.425-acre (115,030 m^{2}) park, prior to the stadium construction, featured baseball and softball diamonds, basketball courts, and football and soccer fields. Portions of the park are often used during New York Yankees home games to provide overspill parking for vehicles in an area underserved by garages and other parking facilities.

== Early history ==
Macombs Dam Park opened in 1899, when the Bronx was mostly farmland. As was typical for urban planning at that time, a large, central greenspace was set aside to ensure that the developing neighborhood would be livable and sustainable. This same type of development had already been thriving around Manhattan's Central Park and Brooklyn's Prospect Park, among several other New York locations. Parks advocates contend that Macombs Dam Park is no less valuable than Central Park or Prospect Park, which are both in much wealthier neighborhoods. Macombs Dam Park is in New York's 16th congressional district, the poorest in the United States.

Yankee Stadium opened in 1923 and the Bronx County Courthouse, two blocks east on Grand Concourse, opened in 1934. Most of the neighborhood's apartment buildings opened in the 1920s and 1930s, including many Art Deco landmarks that line the perimeter of what had been Macombs Dam Park.

== New Yankee Stadium ==
Bronx officials had promised that replacement parks would be built before the stadium project began. When the $1.6 billion stadium was completed, residents had several new recreation areas, including ballfields on the Harlem River waterfront, about a half-mile from the former Macombs Dam and Mullaly Parks. Other recreation areas are on top of parking garages where the parks had been; these will be closed on game days, which make up 81 days of the 183 days between April and September, to accommodate fans' cars. The roofs of the garages, with an artificial surface, are counted as replacement parkland by New York City. Other replacement recreation areas are on the 9-acre (36,000 m^{2}) site of the old Yankee Stadium. The above ground structure of the ballpark, built in 1923, was torn down, with the underground clubhouses remaining in use for the new parkland.

The new recreation areas ultimately cost nearly $195 million, paid for by New York City as part of the Yankee Stadium redevelopment project. By contrast, renovating Macombs Dam and John Mullaly parks would have cost about $25 million. The city's parks department will retain ownership of the land under the Yankees' new stadium, but do not charge the Yankees rent or property taxes.

Residents and parks advocates had criticized the Yankees' changes to the neighborhood, which included cutting down 377 mature oak trees. They said state and federal laws designed to protect parkland from private development made this project unfair and possibly illegal. According to the city's Environmental Impact Statement for the Yankees' stadium project, several buildings surrounding Macombs Dam Park may become blighted when the project is completed. Opponents to the construction of the new Stadium were defeated and the Stadium officially opened on April 3, 2009, for an exhibition game against the Chicago Cubs.

== Dog access ==
The entire park is an off-leash designated dog park. Certain areas, like the running track, are labeled as No Dogs Allowed.
