= Henry Wilson Hodge =

American civil engineer (1865–1919)

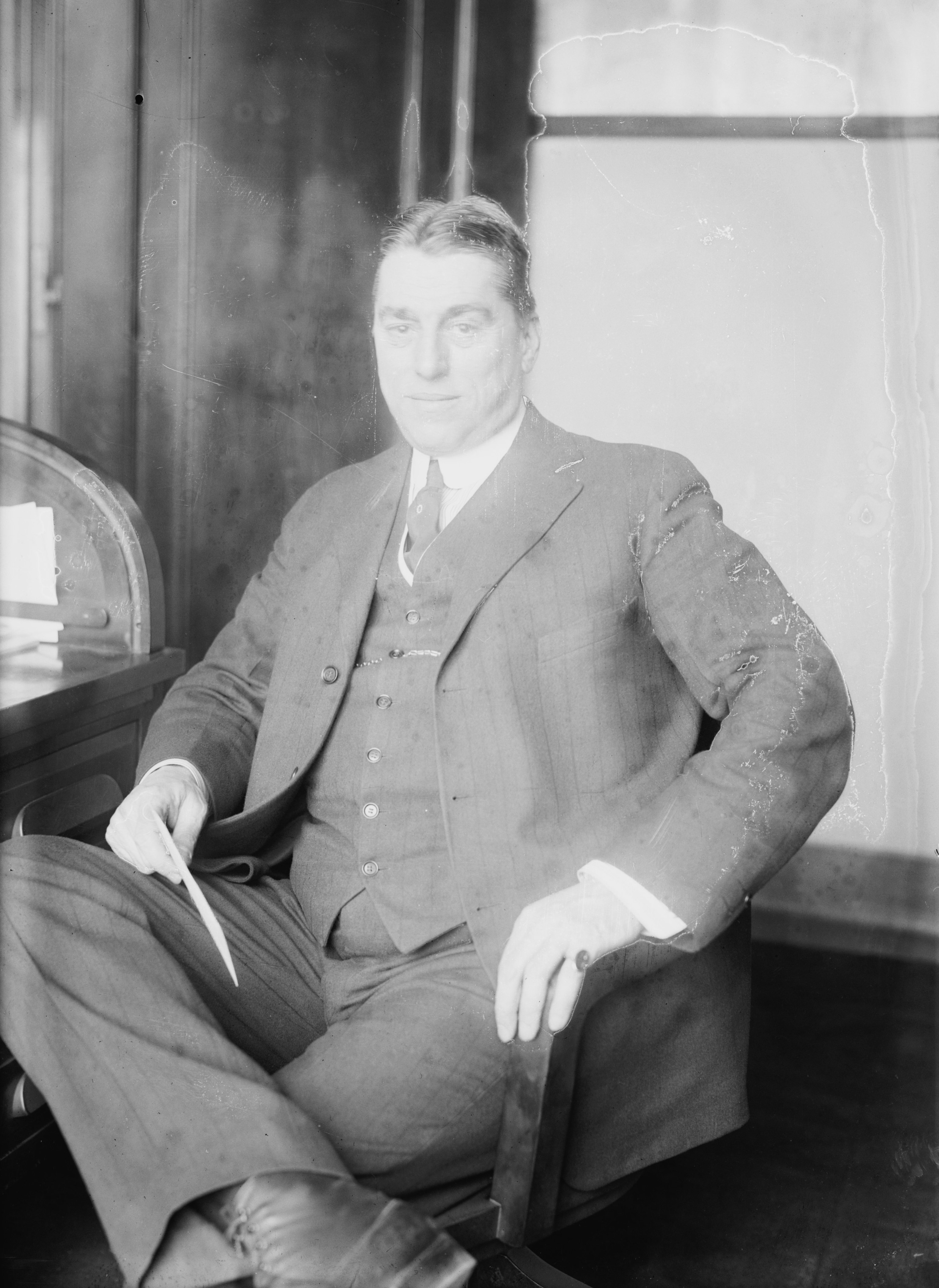
- Hodge c. 1915
- Born: April 14, 1865; Washington, D.C., U.S.
- Died: December 21, 1919 (aged 54); New York, New York, U.S.
- Burial place: Laurel Hill Cemetery, Philadelphia, Pennsylvania, U.S.
- Military career
- Allegiance: United States
- Branch: Army
- Service years: 1917–1919
- Rank: Colonel
- Commands: Manager of Roads; Assistant Chief Engineer; Director of Railroads
- Conflicts: World War I

Public Service Commission of New York City

Colonel Henry Wilson Hodge (April 14, 1865 – December 21, 1919) was an American civil engineer and bridge designer. He co-founded the engineering firm Boller & Hodges with Alfred P. Boller, designed numerous bridges in multiple countries, and constructed steel buildings including the Woolworth Building, the Singer Building, and the Cunard Building in New York City. He served on the Public Service Commission for New York City from 1916 to 1917 and as a colonel in the U.S. Army during World War I, where he had responsibility for all railroad structures for the American Expeditionary Forces in France.

== Early life and education ==
Born on April 14, 1865, in Washington, D.C., he was the son of John Ledyard Hodge and Susan Savage Wilson. He was educated at Young's Private School in Washington, D.C., and joined a surveying party for the Chesapeake and Ohio Railway in the mountains of West Virginia at the age of 15. He graduated from Rensselaer Polytechnic Institute in 1885. He received a Doctor of Engineers degree from Rensselaer in 1918.

== Engineering career ==
Hodge began his career at the Phoenix Bridge Company and worked there for six years. In 1891, he worked as the chief engineer of the Union Iron Works in New York City; two years later, he left Union Iron Works and worked as an independent engineering consultant. In 1895, he began working for Alfred P. Boller and, in 1899, co-founded the engineering firm Boller & Hodge with his former boss. The firm expanded with the addition of Howard C. Baird and became Boller, Hodge & Baird. After the death of Boller in 1912, the firm was renamed Hodge and Baird.

He designed the bridges for multiple railroad expansions in the United States, including the Choctaw, Oklahoma and Gulf Railroad and the Great Northern Railway, as well as all the bridges for the national railroads of Mexico, Brazil, and the Philippines. He designed the cantilever bridges over the Monongahela River at Pittsburgh and over the Ohio River at Steubenville for the Wabash Railroad. He designed three bridges over the Connecticut River, including at Hartford, Old Saybrook, and the East Haddam Swing Bridge. He was hired by the Canadian government as a consulting engineer to help with the design of the Quebec Bridge.

He worked for a while as president of Porterfield Construction Company. He was the engineer for construction of the Woolworth Building, the Singer Building, the Cunard Building, and other buildings in New York City. He advised and consulted on multiple projects; in January 1916, he accepted a position on the Public Service Commission of New York City to supervise the construction of subway system expansions. After his return from service in World War I, he was a member of the Board of Consulting Engineers for the New York and New Jersey Vehicular Tunnel.

== Military career ==
Around 1891, Hodge joined the 7th Regiment of the New York National Guard and subsequently received a commission to the Engineer Officers' Reserve Corps. When the U.S. entered World War I, Hodges resigned from the Public Service Commission and sailed to France in July 1917 at the rank of major. He served on General Pershing's staff as director of military railroads for the American Expeditionary Force and was placed in charge of railroad structures for the U.S. Army in France. He also served as manager of roads and as assistant chief engineer in charge of military bridges.

He was promoted to lieutenant colonel on October 16, 1917, and to colonel on August 13, 1918. He returned to the United States and was honorably discharged on January 22, 1919.

He was awarded the Distinguished Service Medal posthumously.

== Professional memberships ==
He served on the boards of control for Rensselaer Polytechnic Institute, New York University and Princeton Theological Seminary. He served as Director of the Knickerbocker Hospital. In 1914, he became a member of the Presbyterian Board of Foreign Missions.

Hodge was a member of the American Society of Civil Engineers, the American Institute of Consulting Engineers, and the Canadian Society of Civil Engineers.

== Personal life and final years ==
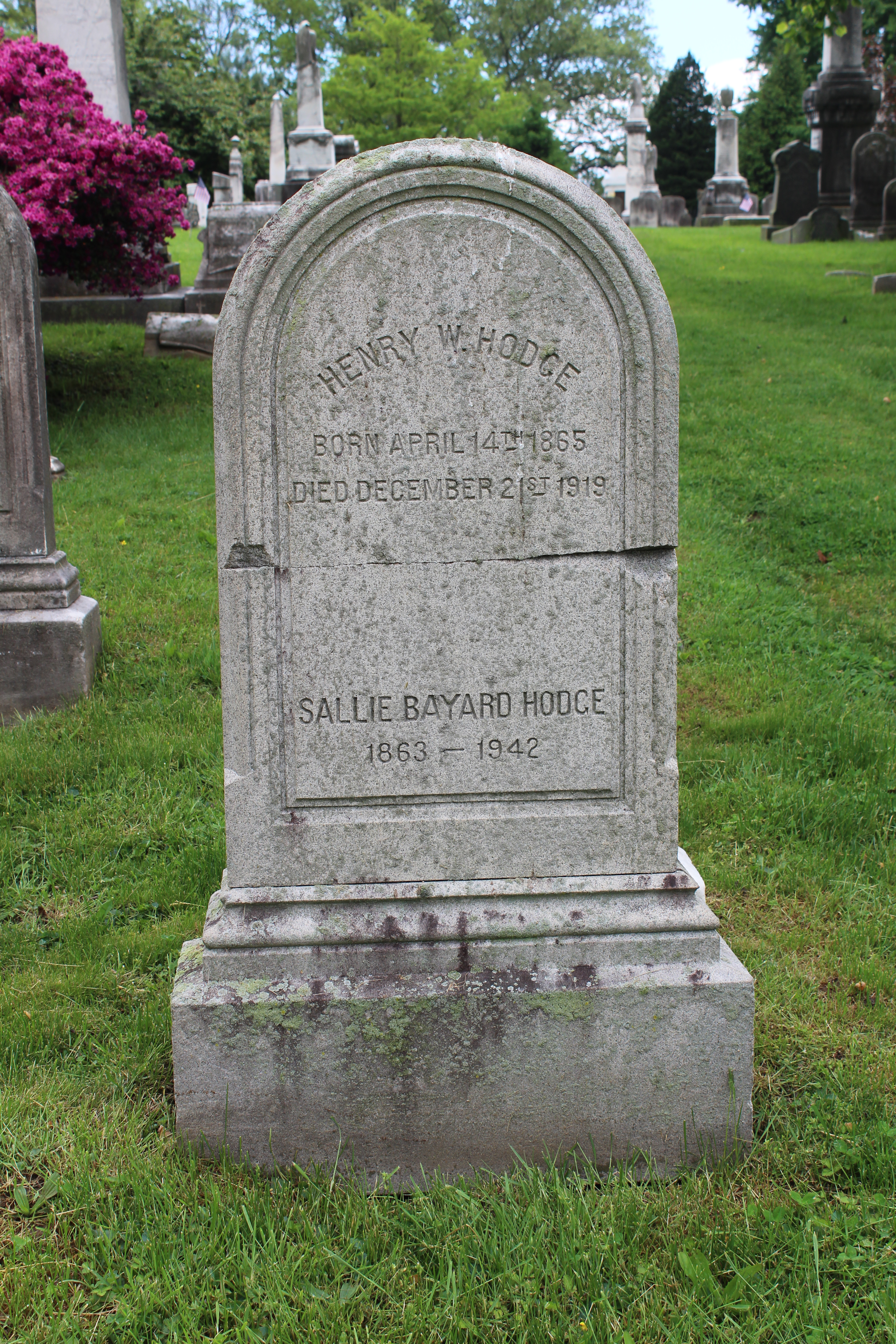
Henry Wilson Hodge grave at Laurel Hill Cemetery

He married Sarah Cunningham Mills, aka Sarah Mills Hodge, on December 14, 1897, in Savannah, Georgia.

After his return from France, Hodge's health began to decline. He died in New York City on December 21, 1919, of an embolism and was interred at Laurel Hill Cemetery in Philadelphia.
