= Alfred P. Boller =

American civil engineer and bridge designer

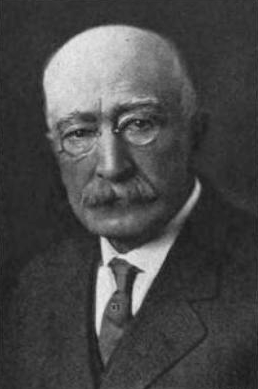
- Born: February 23, 1840; Philadelphia, Pennsylvania
- Died: December 9, 1912 (aged 72); East Orange, New Jersey
- Education: University of Pennsylvania, Rensselaer Polytechnic Institute
- Engineering career
- Projects: Third Market Street Bridge; Madison Avenue Bridge; 145th Street Bridge; Macombs Dam Bridge; Putnam Bridge; University Heights Bridge

Alfred Pancoast Boller (February 23, 1840 – December 9, 1912) was a civil engineer and bridge designer. He was the chief engineer on several bridge building projects during the late 1800 and early 1900s. Born in Philadelphia, Pennsylvania in the United States, Boller graduated from the University of Pennsylvania in Philadelphia and from Rensselaer Polytechnic Institute in Troy, New York. He co-founded an engineering company, Boller & Hodge, along with Henry Wilson Hodge that was based in New York City. Boller designed the third Market Street Bridge in Williamsport, Pennsylvania, several swing bridges over the Harlem River in New York City and the East Haddam Swing Bridge in Connecticut. He was also the chief engineer of Manhattan's elevated railroads.
