= Jerome Avenue =

Avenue in the Bronx, New York

Coordinates: 40°51′42.22″N 73°54′6.61″W

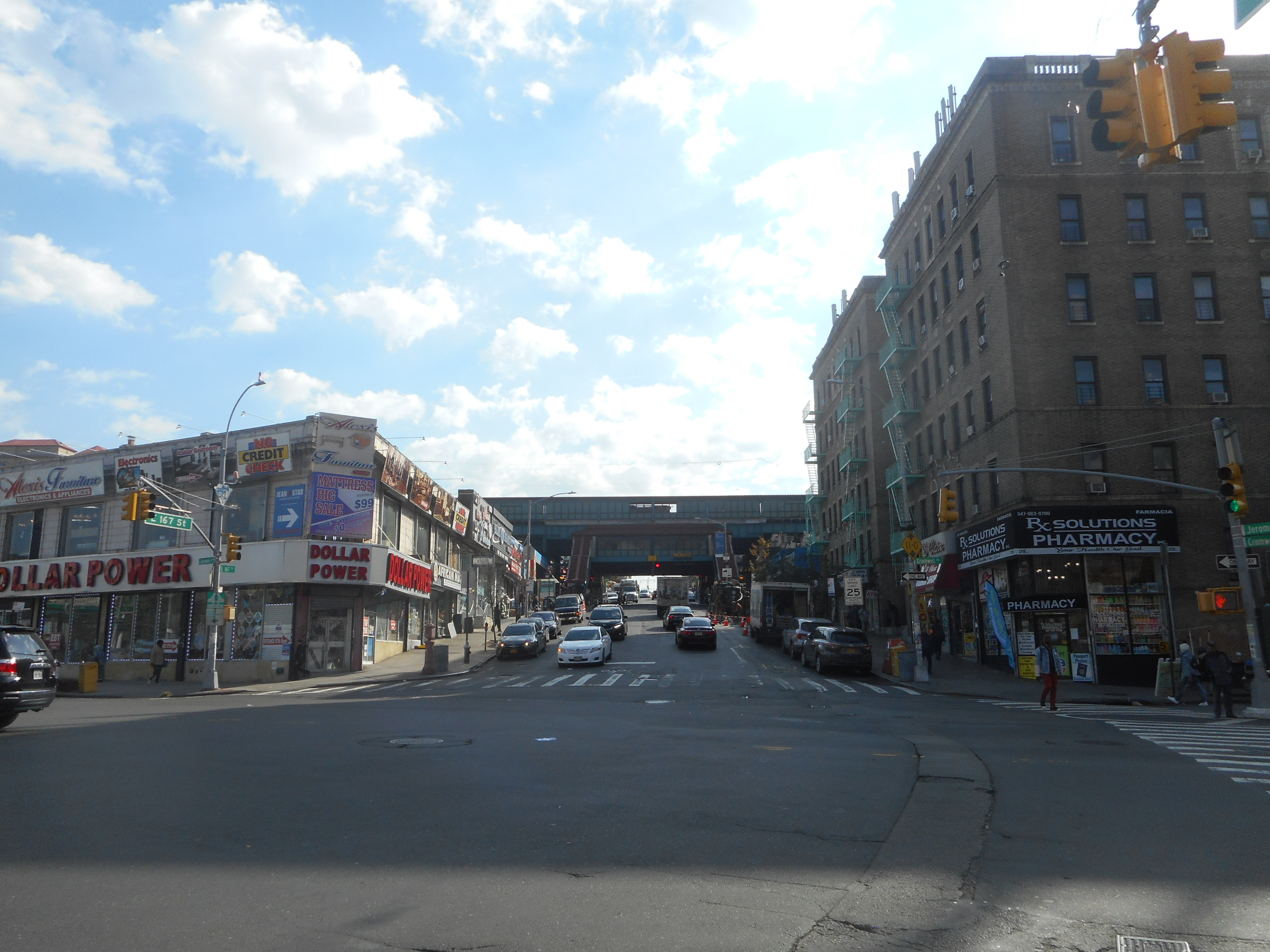
- Jerome Avenue at 167th Street. The subway station up the road is one block east over River Avenue.
- Namesake: Jerome Park Racetrack
- Owner: City of New York
- Maintained by: NYCDOT
- Length: 6.4 mi (10.3 km)
- Location: Bronx, New York City
- Nearest metro station: IRT Jerome Avenue Line
- South end: I-87 in Highbridge
- Major junctions: I-95 / US 1 in Morris Heights; Mosholu Parkway in Bedford Park; I-87 in Van Cortlandt Park
- North end: Central Park Avenue at the Van Cortlandt Park–Yonkers line

Jerome Avenue is one of the longest thoroughfares in the New York City borough of the Bronx, New York, United States. The road is 5.6 miles (9.0 km) long and stretches from Concourse to Woodlawn. Both of these termini are with the Major Deegan Expressway which runs parallel to the west. Most of the elevated IRT Jerome Avenue Line runs along Jerome Avenue. The Cross Bronx Expressway interchanges with Jerome and the Deegan. Though it runs through what is now the West Bronx neighborhood, Jerome Avenue is the dividing avenue between nominal and some named "West" and "East" streets in the Bronx; Fifth Avenue, and to a lesser extent, Broadway, also splits Manhattan into nominal "West" and "East" streets.

== Street description ==
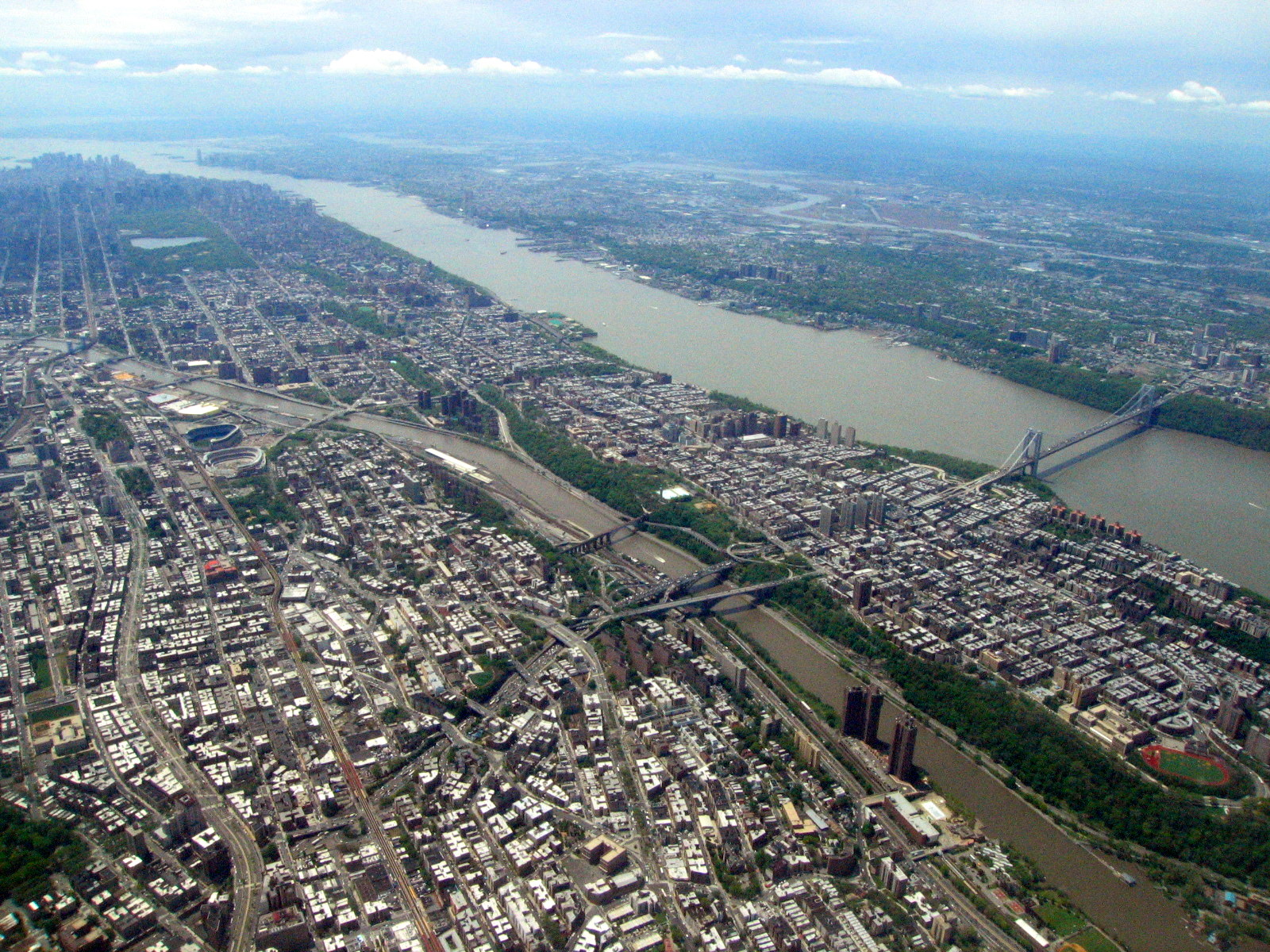
The IRT Jerome Avenue Line is the brown straight line linking the two Yankee stadiums with the bottom of the picture.

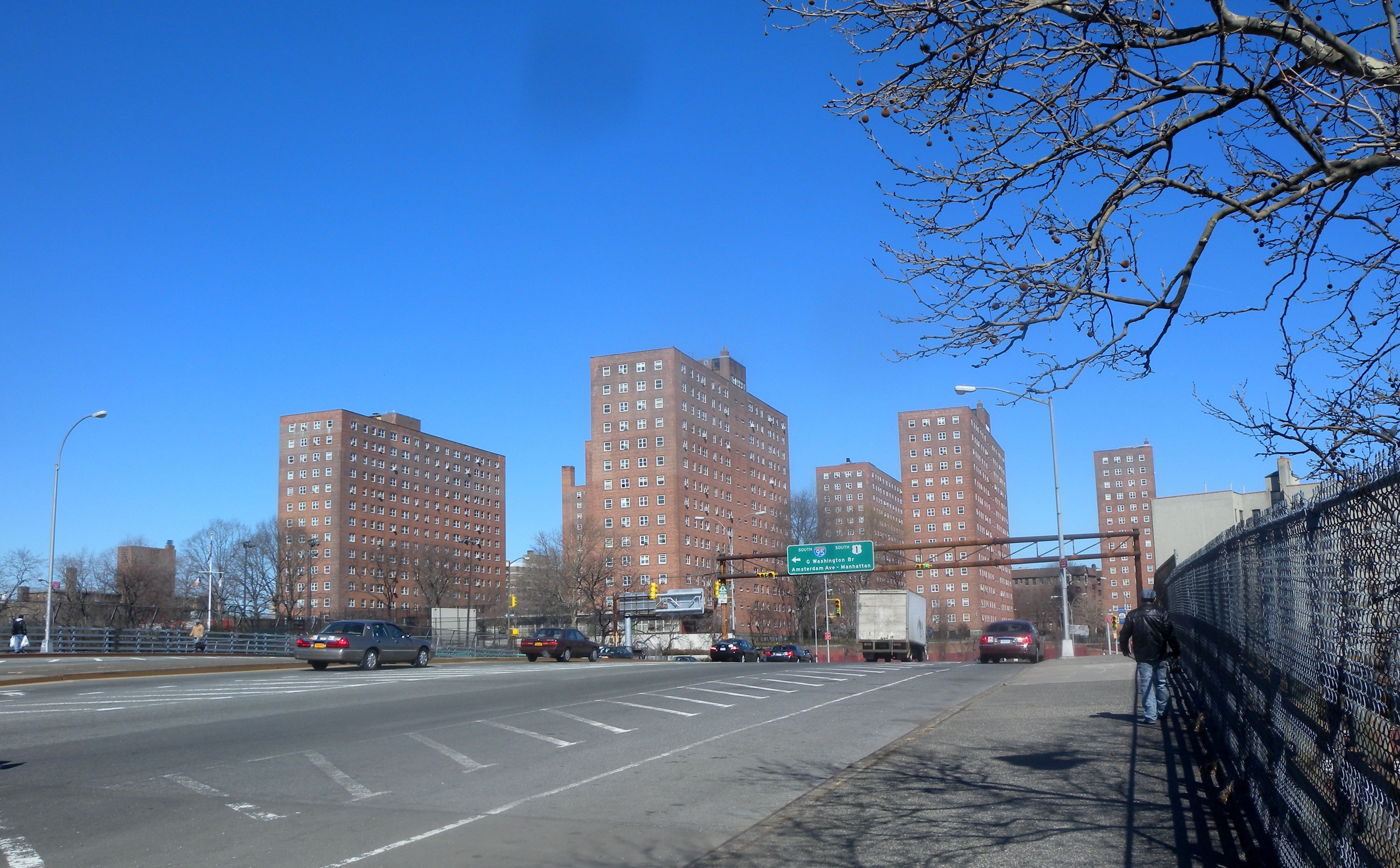
Edward L Grant Highway crosses Cross Bronx Expressway.

The south end of Jerome Avenue is at exit 5 of the Major Deegan Expressway. The road begins as a divided highway, intersecting with 161st Street, which goes east to Yankee Stadium and the 161st Street–Yankee Stadium station of the IRT Jerome Avenue Line (served by the 4 train). Jerome merges into the road to the Macombs Dam Bridge and heads north, paralleling Macombs Dam Park. After some intersections with local roads, Jerome Avenue intersects with 167th Street which at the intersection which, west of there, is named Edward L. Grant Highway. Just east of the intersection is the 167th Street station, another station along the way. Several blocks north, 170th Street intersects, just before crossing the Edward L. Grant Highway.

Mt. Eden Avenue intersects in Morris Heights and the Cross Bronx Expressway does soon after. North the intersection with Tremont Avenue, Burnside Avenue intersects as Jerome Avenue leaves Morris Heights. 183rd Street is the next major intersection, in University Heights. Fordham Road, both East and West intersect in University Heights. Saint James Park is passed to the east of Jerome, south of the intersection with Kingsbridge Road. As Jerome passes Lehman College, Bedford Park Boulevard (200th Street) intersects. Jerome Avenue then crosses the Mosholu Parkway on an overpass, after passing the Mosholu Yard.

After Mosholu Parkway, Jerome Avenue enters the Norwood neighborhood. There, Jerome Avenue intersects with Gun Hill Road, with Van Cortlandt Park to the west. The final station on the IRT line is located just before intersecting Bainbridge Avenue. Jerome Avenue continues, cuts between Van Cortlandt Park and Woodlawn Cemetery, after which it enters Woodlawn. Jerome Avenue comes to an end at the Major Deegan and 233rd Street. The road continues as a service road for the Major Deegan, until it reaches the Bronx-Westchester border, where it becomes Central Park Avenue (NY 100), one of the main streets of the city of Yonkers.

== History ==
Jerome Avenue was put together as a plank road in 1874 for $375,000. It appeared on maps as Central Avenue, because it started from Macombs Dam Bridge (Central Bridge) to Jerome Park Racetrack. Borough President Louis F. Haffen selected contractors in 1897 to pave Jerome Avenue. Three sections of the road were to be remodeled, costing the Bronx about $136,505. The street was to be renamed after an unknown city alderman. Kate Hall Jerome, wife of Lawrence Jerome, was furious, replacing all the signs with the name Jerome Avenue in honor of Jerome Park Racetrack opened by her husband's financier brother, Leonard Jerome in 1866. When the subway line was commissioned, Jerome went from rural road to commercial artery.

The southern part of the avenue, from the intersection with 161st Street, formed the western edge of Macombs Dam Park. The parkland was alienated by the state legislature to enable construction of a new Yankee Stadium. Lower portions of the thoroughfare were demapped by the City Planning Commission, followed by the Department of City Planning's 2006 release of the Bronx Harlem River Waterfront Bicycle and Pedestrian Study. The Park Plaza Apartments at 1005 Jerome Avenue, one of the borough's first and most prominent Art Deco apartment houses and a New York City landmark since 1981, was overlooked in the environmental impact statement and is now in the shadow of the completed new stadium.

In March 2018, the New York City Council voted to approve the rezoning of 92 blocks in the South Bronx, centered along Jerome Avenue from 165th to 184th Streets. The rezoning will allow developers to construct 4,600 housing units along the corridor, including 1,500 affordable housing units. At the time of the rezoning, the corridor consisted mainly of small businesses, warehouses, and auto-parts shops.

== Transportation ==
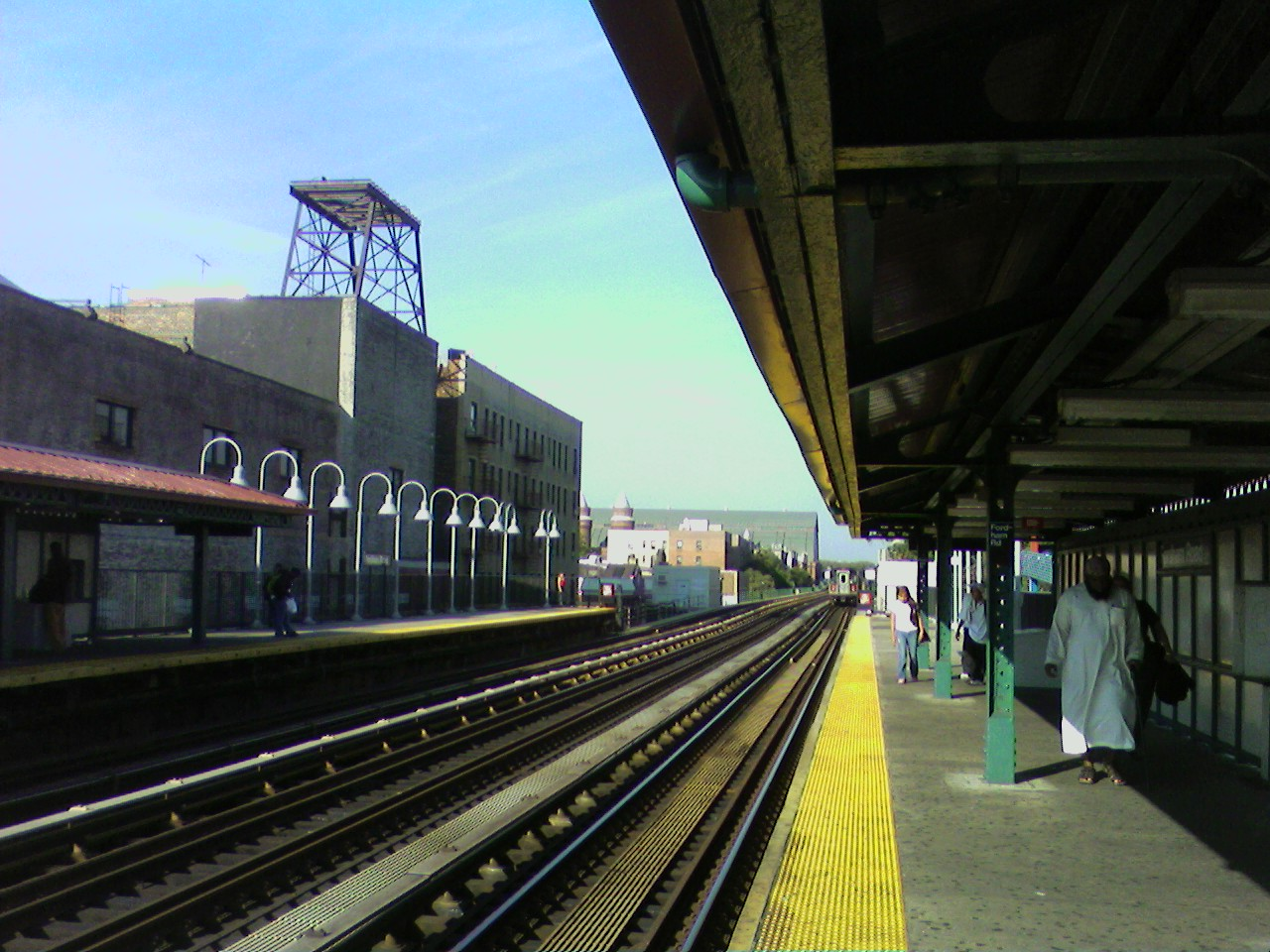
Fordham Road

The New York City Subway's Jerome Avenue elevated line, served by the 4 train, runs along most of Jerome Avenue. The now-demolished Ninth Avenue elevated merged with the Jerome Avenue line south of the 167th Street station. The first station along the Jerome Avenue elevated line is the 161st Street–Yankee Stadium station, served by the 4, B, and D trains. All of the Jerome Avenue Line's elevated stations north of 167th Street, with the exception of Bedford Park Boulevard–Lehman College, are located directly above Jerome Avenue. The line and the 4 train have their northern terminus at Woodlawn, at the eastern edge of Van Cortlandt Park.

The Jerome Avenue Line south of Kingsbridge Road opened on June 2, 1917. The Bedford Park Boulevard, Mosholu Parkway, and Woodlawn stations opened on April 15, 1918.

The following bus routes serve Jerome Avenue:

- The Bx32 between Mott Haven and James J. Peters VA Medical Center supplements the IRT Jerome Avenue Line between 176th Street and Kingsbridge Road, running under the el between East 175th Street and West 195th Street.
- The Bx28 runs between East Kingsbridge Road and Bedford Park Boulevard. From there, the Bx10 runs to East Gun Hill Road. From there, the Pelham-bound Bx16 and Woodlawn-bound Bx34 and BxM4 run to East 233rd Street.
- The Hunts Point-bound Bx6 local & Select Bus Service run from Ogden Avenue to East 161st Street, along with the Bx13 in both directions.
- Under Westchester County's Bee-Line Bus System, routes 4 & 20 and part-time route 21 serve Jerome Avenue north of West 205th Street (Bronx) or Bedford Park Boulevard (opposite terminals).

== Major intersections ==
| County | Location | mi | km | Destinations | Notes |
|---|---|---|---|---|---|
| The Bronx | Highbridge | 0.0 | 0.0 | I-87 north (Major Deegan Expressway) | Exit 6 on I-87 |
| The Bronx | Highbridge | 0.1 | 0.16 | East 161st Street | Serves Yankee Stadium |
| The Bronx | Highbridge | 0.2 | 0.32 | Macombs Dam Bridge to I-87 south (Major Deegan Expressway) | |
| The Bronx | Highbridge | 0.7 | 1.1 | Edward L. Grant Highway to I-95 south (US 1 south) – George Washington Bridge | |
| The Bronx | Morris Heights | 1.5 | 2.4 | I-95 / US 1 (Cross Bronx Expressway) to I-87 – George Washington Bridge, New Haven, CT | Exit 2A on I-95 |
| The Bronx | Morris Heights | 2.0 | 3.2 | Tremont Avenue | |
| The Bronx | Fordham | 2.9 | 4.7 | Fordham Road to I-87 (Major Deegan Expressway) / I-95 (Cross Bronx Expressway) | |
| The Bronx | Bedford Park | 4.4 | 7.1 | To Mosholu Parkway | Access via service roads |
| The Bronx | Norwood | 4.7 | 7.6 | Gun Hill Road | |
| The Bronx | Van Cortlandt Park | 5.6 | 9.0 | East 233rd Street | |
| The Bronx | Van Cortlandt Park | 5.7 | 9.2 | I-87 (Major Deegan Expressway) to New York Thruway north – Manhattan, Queens, Albany | Exit 13 on I-87 |
| The Bronx | Van Cortlandt Park | 6.3 | 10.1 | I-87 south (Major Deegan Expressway) – Manhattan, Queens | Southbound exit and northbound entrance; exit 14 on I-87 |
| Bronx–Westchester county line | Van Cortlandt Park–Yonkers line | 6.4 | 10.3 | Central Park Avenue | Continuation north; former NY 100 |
1.000 mi = 1.609 km; 1.000 km = 0.621 mi: Incomplete access
