= 145th Street Bridge =

Bridge between Manhattan and the Bronx, New York

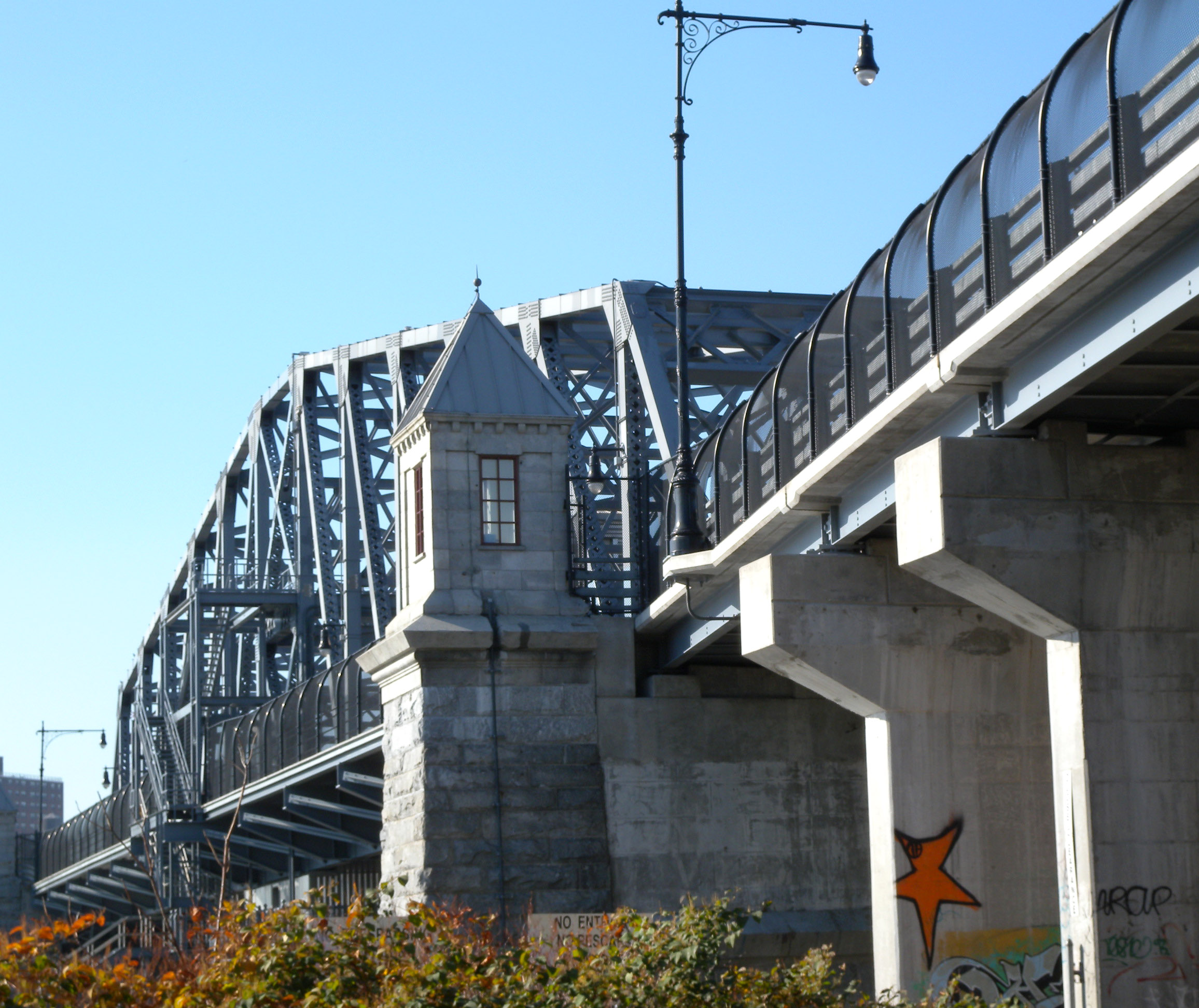
- View from the Bronx
- Coordinates: 40.819461°N 73.933053°W
- Carries: 4 lanes of roadway
- Crosses: Harlem River
- Locale: Manhattan and the Bronx, New York City
- Owner: City of New York
- Maintained by: NYCDOT
- Preceded by: Macombs Dam Bridge
- Followed by: Madison Avenue Bridge

Characteristics
- Design: Swing bridge
- Total length: 1,602 feet (488.29 m)
- Longest span: 300 feet (91.44 m)

History
- Construction cost: $85 million
- Opened: August 4, 1905
- Rebuilt: February 2007

Statistics
- Daily traffic: 29,315 (2016)

Location
- Interactive map of 145th Street Bridge

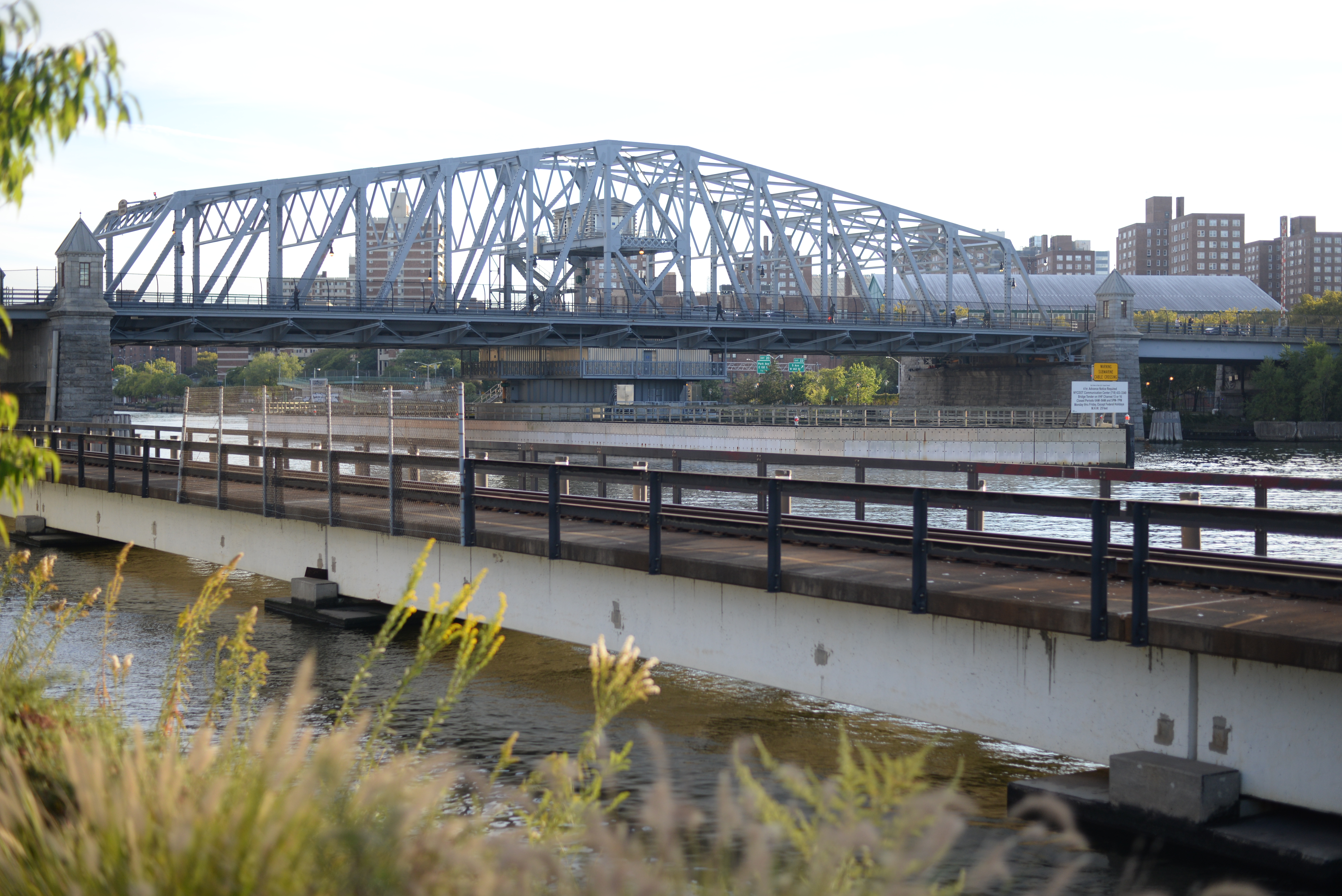
The 145th St Bridge above the Oak Point Link railway in 2025.

The 145th Street Bridge is a four-lane swing bridge across the Harlem River in New York City, connecting West 145th Street and Lenox Avenue in Manhattan with East 149th Street and River Avenue in the Bronx. The bridge is operated and maintained by the New York City Department of Transportation.

The 145th Street Bridge carries the Bx19 bus route operated by MTA New York City Transit. Between 2000 and 2014, the bridge opened for vessels 23 times.

== History ==
At the end of the 19th century, rapid growth in the South Bronx area necessitated another Harlem River crossing. Construction on the original 145th St Bridge began on April 19, 1901. The designer was Alfred Pancoast Boller, who based the design on the Macombs Dam Bridge but modified it so that growth in water travel could be accommodated. Completion was delayed due to the construction of the 145th Street station (IRT Lenox Avenue Line) beneath one pier; the $2.75 million bridge was opened to traffic on August 24, 1905. It once carried northbound New York State Route 22 and New York State Route 100. This bridge was also once named the "Lenox Avenue Bridge", though that name has fallen into disuse.

In 1957, the bridge was improved by building approach spans over Harlem River Drive, and again in 1990 with the construction of three more spans to provide the Oak Point Link railway a right-of-way.

A new swing span for the bridge was assembled in the Port of Coeymans in Coeymans, New York, in southern Albany County. The new span arrived in New York in 2006, and the span was replaced in February 2007.
