= 161st Street (Bronx) =

Street in the Bronx, New York

Coordinates: 40°49′29.23″N 73°54′56.73″W

East 161st Street
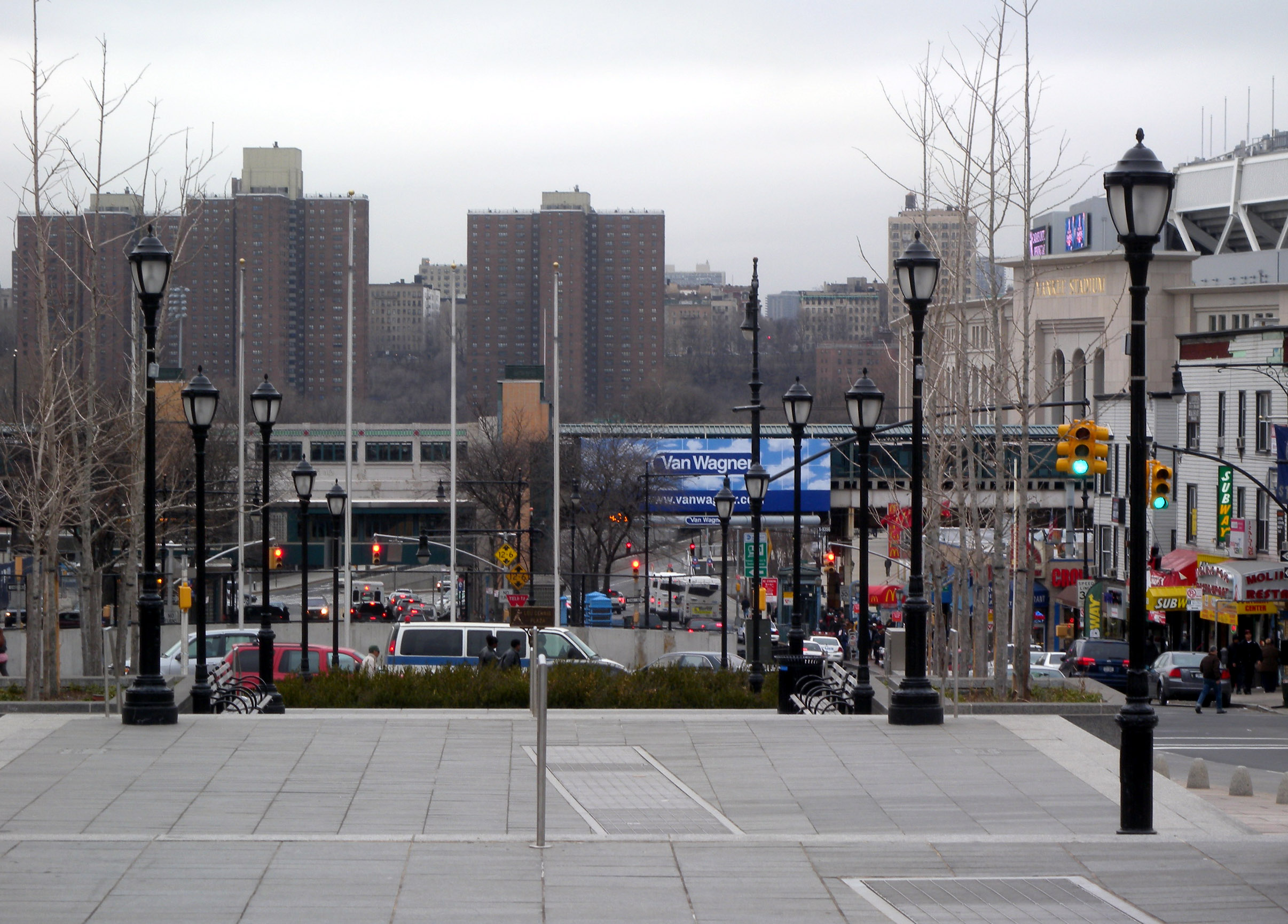
- Looking west down East 161st Street from Grand Concourse
- Interactive map of East 161st Street
- Owner: City of New York
- Maintained by: NYCDOT
- Length: 1.5 mi (2.4 km)
- Location: Bronx, New York City
- West end: Jerome Avenue in Highbridge
- East end: Elton Avenue in Melrose

161st Street is a short, major thoroughfare in the southern portion of the Bronx. The road is 1.6 miles (2.6 km) long and is a much used access to Yankee Stadium on its north side. The 20th-century Yankee Stadium was on the south side of the street. The road begins in the west at an intersection with Jerome Avenue, a major thoroughfare in the Bronx, and Woodycrest Avenue, a one-way street in the Bronx. The road is one of the widest in the Bronx, until the Sheridan Avenue intersection, where the divided highway merges. East 161st Street ends at Elton Avenue. However, the road continues eastward in parts, ending at Hewitt Place, as a short connector.

== History ==
East 161st Street was Cedar Street from the Harlem River to Grand Concourse. It was named after a property built in 1840 called "The Cedars". In the village of Melrose, East 161st was known as William Street. From Third Avenue to Prospect Avenue, East 161st Street was known as Grove Hill and was renamed later as Cliff Street.

== Description ==
East 161st Street begins at an intersection with Woodycrest Avenue and Jerome Avenue in the Bronx. The road passes a parking lot to the south and crosses under the Macombs Dam Bridge soon after. After the intersection with Ruppert Place, East 161st passes the south side of Yankee Stadium. Just after Yankee Stadium, River Avenue crosses over East 161st Street. At this intersection is the only subway station on East 161st Street. East 161st is then split by a median used for parking. Grand Concourse, a major thoroughfare in the Bronx intersects soon after, ending the divided highway system on East 161st Street. After the Melrose Avenue intersection, the first section of East 161st Street comes to an end as the road continues as Elton Avenue. The second section of East 161st Street is a one-way street; it begins at an intersection with Third Avenue, intersects with Brook Avenue, and makes a curve to the south as Washington Avenue. The third section of East 161st Street begins at Third Avenue, just south of the second section. This one is a half-mile, stretching from Third Avenue to Prospect Avenue. The final, easternmost section begins at an intersection at Westchester Avenue and ends at Hewitt Place, a short connector.

== Transportation ==
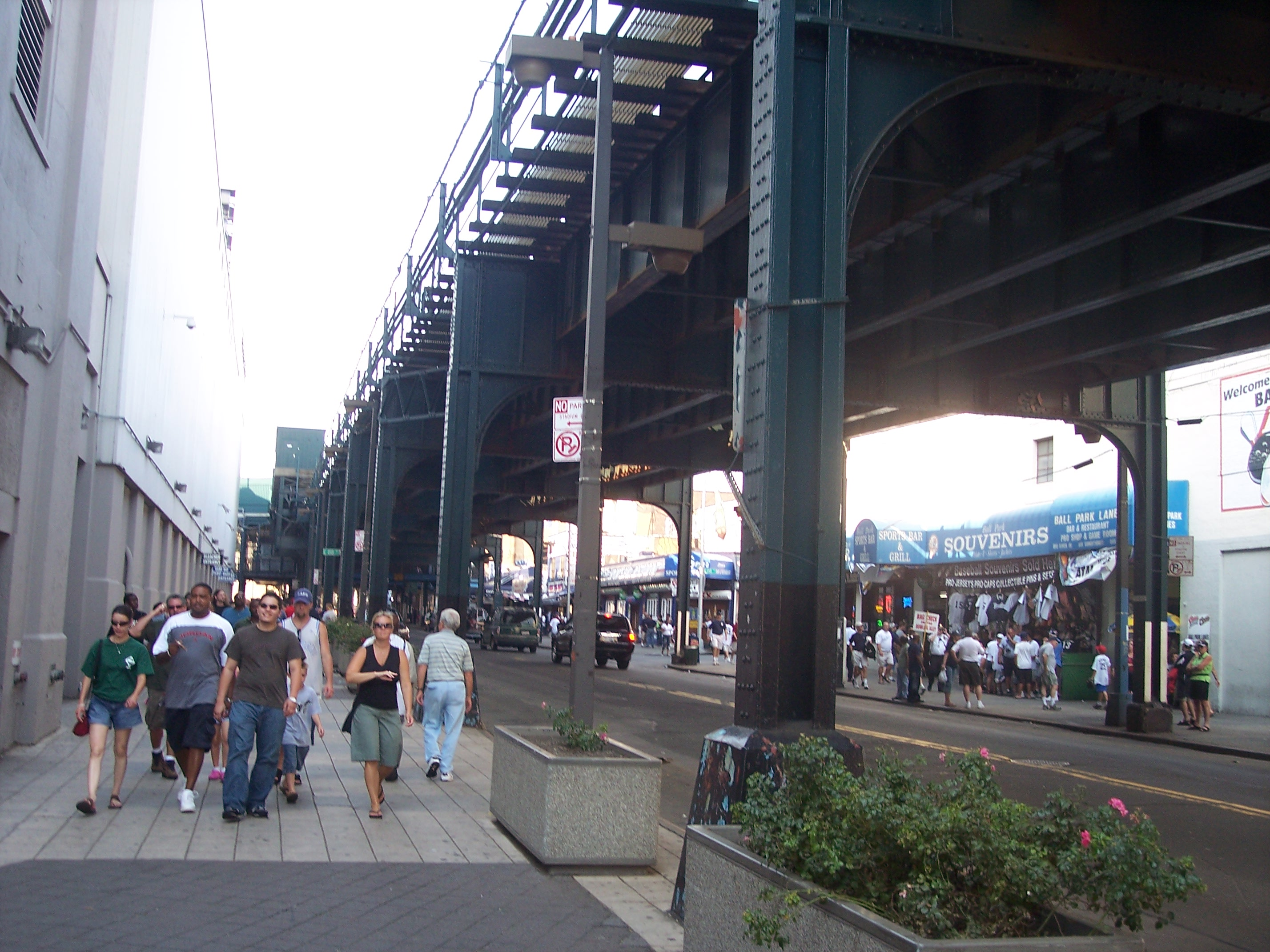
View down River Avenue from 161st Street station

There is one subway station complex, 161st Street–Yankee Stadium station, along the street, located at the intersection of East 161st Street and River Avenue. It is served by the 4, B, and D trains. The station was opened in 1917 for the elevated IRT Woodlawn Line (4 train). The second part was opened in 1933 for the underground IND Concourse Line (B and D trains).

Two bus lines run along 161st Street, the Bx6 and the Bx13, but each has differences:

- Bx6 service to Manhattan heads straight onto the Macombs Dam Bridge.
- Most Bx13 trips serve west of River Avenue, with remaining ones serving east.

There was also a Bx49, which was merged with the Bx13 in 1984.

In 2017, the city announced plans to restrict eastbound traffic on the central roadway west of Sheridan Avenue, which passes under Grand Concourse, to buses only. This closure was proposed in conjunction with the implementation of the Bx6 Select Bus Service line. When the Bx6 SBS was implemented that September, a center-running bus lane and new medians with bus stops were added for eastbound buses east of Sheridan Avenue. In 2026, the administration of Mayor Zohran Mamdani began upgrading the bus lanes on 161st Street. This project would add a westbound bus lane on 161st Street, and the central roadway west of Sheridan Avenue would be converted into a bus-only roadway.

== See also ==
- 161st Street (Manhattan)
