= Macomb's Dam Bridge (painting) =

1935 painting by Edward Hopper

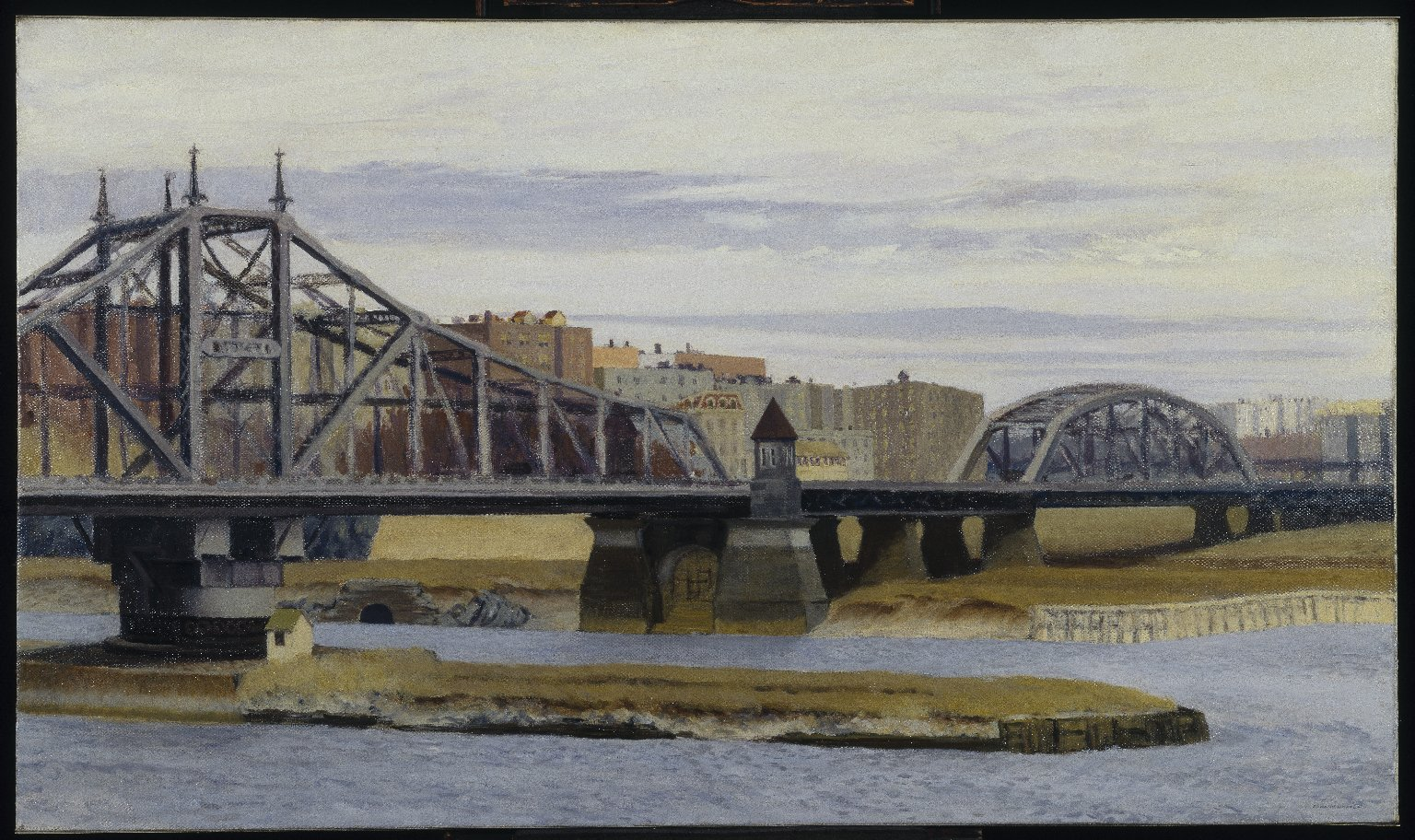
- Artist: Edward Hopper
- Year: 1935
- Movement: American Realism
- Subject: Macombs Dam Bridge
- Dimensions: 35 x 60 3/16in. (88.9 x 152.9cm) frame: 40 7/8 x 66 x 3 3/4 in. (103.8 x 167.6 x 9.5 cm)
- Location: Brooklyn Museum, New York
- Owner: Brooklyn Museum

Macomb's Dam Bridge is a 1935 oil painting by the American Realist artist Edward Hopper. The work depicts New York City's Macombs Dam Bridge; the scene is quiet and empty in contrast to the bridge's usual traffic. It is in the collection of the Brooklyn Museum in New York.

== See also ==
- List of works by Edward Hopper
