= East Haddam Swing Bridge =

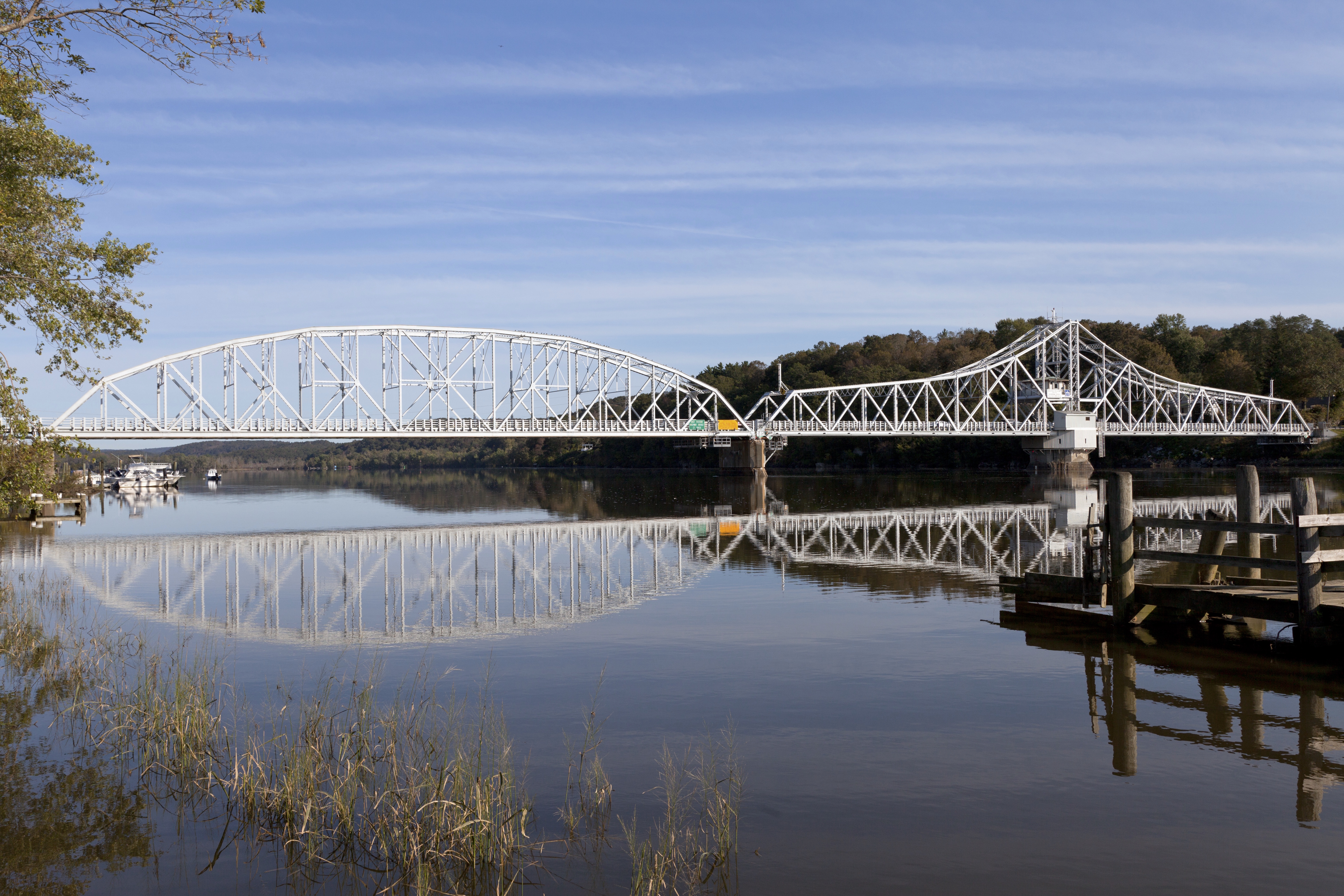
- The bridge in 2011
- Coordinates: 41.45173°N 72.46432°W
- Carries: Route 82
- Crosses: Connecticut River
- Locale: Haddam and East Haddam, Connecticut
- Maintained by: Connecticut Department of Transportation
- ID number: 1138

Characteristics
- Design: Swing truss
- Total length: 881 feet (269 m)
- Width: 24.6 ft (7.5 m)
- Longest span: 456 feet (139 m); 326.1 feet (99.4 m)
- Clearance below: 24.9 ft (7.6 m)

History
- Opened: 1913 (restored 1999, 2007, 2023)

Statistics
- Daily traffic: 11,600

Location
- Interactive map of East Haddam Swing Bridge

The East Haddam Swing Bridge is a steel, movable (swing) truss bridge. The bridge is composed of three spans crossing the Connecticut River between Haddam, Connecticut and East Haddam, Connecticut. The bridge carries Route 82, with an average daily traffic of 11,600. At the time of its construction, it was reputed to be the longest swing bridge of its kind in the world.

== History ==
In 1909, a Governor's commission on transportation recommended the construction of a bridge over the Connecticut River connecting East Haddam and Haddam. Accepting this recommendation, to the triumph of the local communities, the state diverted aid used to fund ferry services to building the East Haddam Bridge, becoming one of the first bridges funded by the state. Since ferry service had been the main mode of transportation beginning in 1694, the East Haddam bridge marked a shift toward more modern means for travel across the Connecticut River. Construction of the bridge began in April 1912 and was completed in June 1913.

On June 14, 1913, Flag Day, the East Haddam Swing Bridge officially opened. It was hailed as an ornament to the "age of progressiveness". The celebration included an address by Governor Simeon E. Baldwin, a 17-gun salute, a Model-T automobile parade, and a concert that drew thousands to the event.

At the time, the State Highway Department had no authority over bridges. This meant the state legislature formed special commissions took the lead on building the East Haddam Bridge. Legislation in 1915 gave the responsibility for all trunk-line bridges in Connecticut, including the East Haddam Bridge, over to the State Highway Department.

A centennial celebration for the bridge was marked on June 15, 2013, with a local parade of antique cars. The East Haddam swing bridge has been judged as being "Individually Eligible for the National Register of Historic Places".

== Construction ==
The state hired Edward W. Bush, a prominent civil engineer in Connecticut at the time, to be the chief engineer of the project. He also designed the piers and approach roadways. The state also hired Boller, Hodge & Baird engineers. A contract for the superstructure of the bridge was given to Holbrook, Cabot, and Rollins of Boston. A contract for the substructure of the bridge was given to American Bridge Company. The pin-connected drawbridge was designed by Alfred P. Boller, an authority on deep bridge foundations, to allow the bridge to pivot/swing, clearing a path for through river travel.

The 3 spans of the bridge are all composed of rivet-connecting steel members. From west to east, the three spans include: A Warren deck truss (101 ft long), a Pennsylvania through truss (327 ft long and one of the longest in the state), and a swing span (461 ft long). Together they bring the total length of the swing bridge to 889 ft. The stone-block piers and abutments are built on timber pilings.

The East Haddam Bridge incorporates numerous interesting technical features, including a center-bearing pivot and moving-wedge end lifts that support the ends of the bridge when closed.

== See also ==
- List of crossings of the Connecticut River
