= NYC Skateboard Coalition =

Skateboarding organization

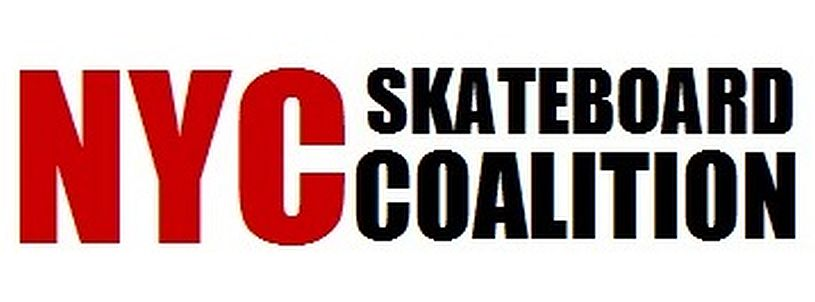
- Founded: 2017
- Founder: Ian Clarke
- Purpose: Skateboarding
- Location: New York City
- Website: http://sk8coalition.nyc/

NYC Skateboard Coalition, established in 2017, is a community organization that advocates for New York City's skateparks and hosts NYC-based skateboard events. The group supports the skateboarding community of New York City through hosting skate jams and skatepark clean-ups throughout the city.

== History ==
=== Founding at Riverside Skatepark ===
In the early 2010s, Ian Clarke, a local skater at Riverside Skatepark, learned about the history of Andy Kessler and Riverside Skatepark from Ricky Mujica. The history and significance of the skatepark made an impression on Clarke. There was a small mini-ramp at the park that was falling apart at the skatepark, reaching out to the Riverside Park Conservancy, Clarke led a permitted repair of the mini-ramp, saving it from destruction. After receiving positive response from the community, Clarke developed a relationship with the Riverside Park Conservancy, working to repair other obstacles in the skatepark with help from members of the community. This community work at Riverside Skatepark inspired Clarke to create the NYC Skateboard Coalition to formalize his organizing efforts in the skateboarding community.

== Programming ==
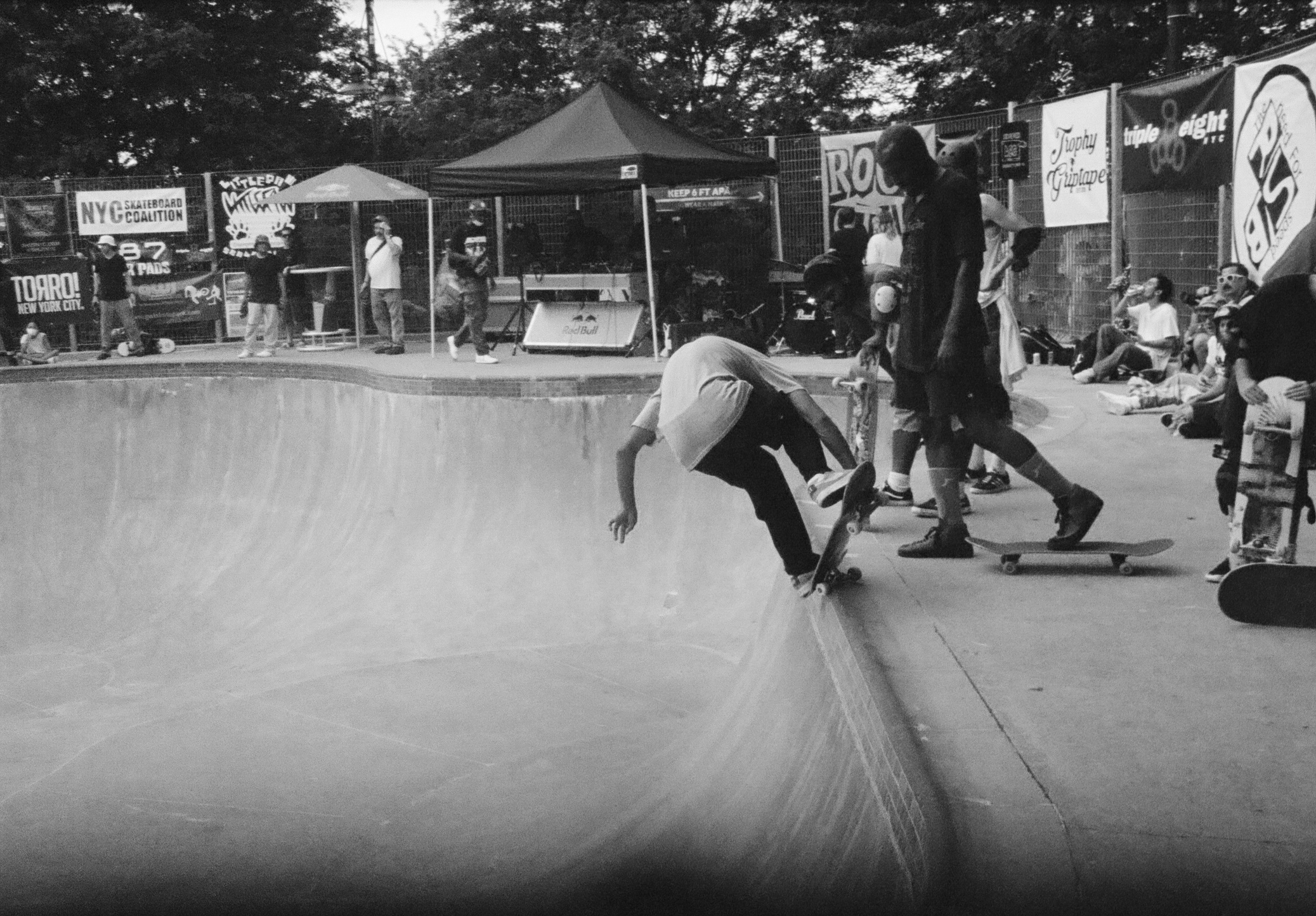
NYC Pool Series 2021 - hosted by NYC Skateboard Coalition at Pier 62 Skatepark

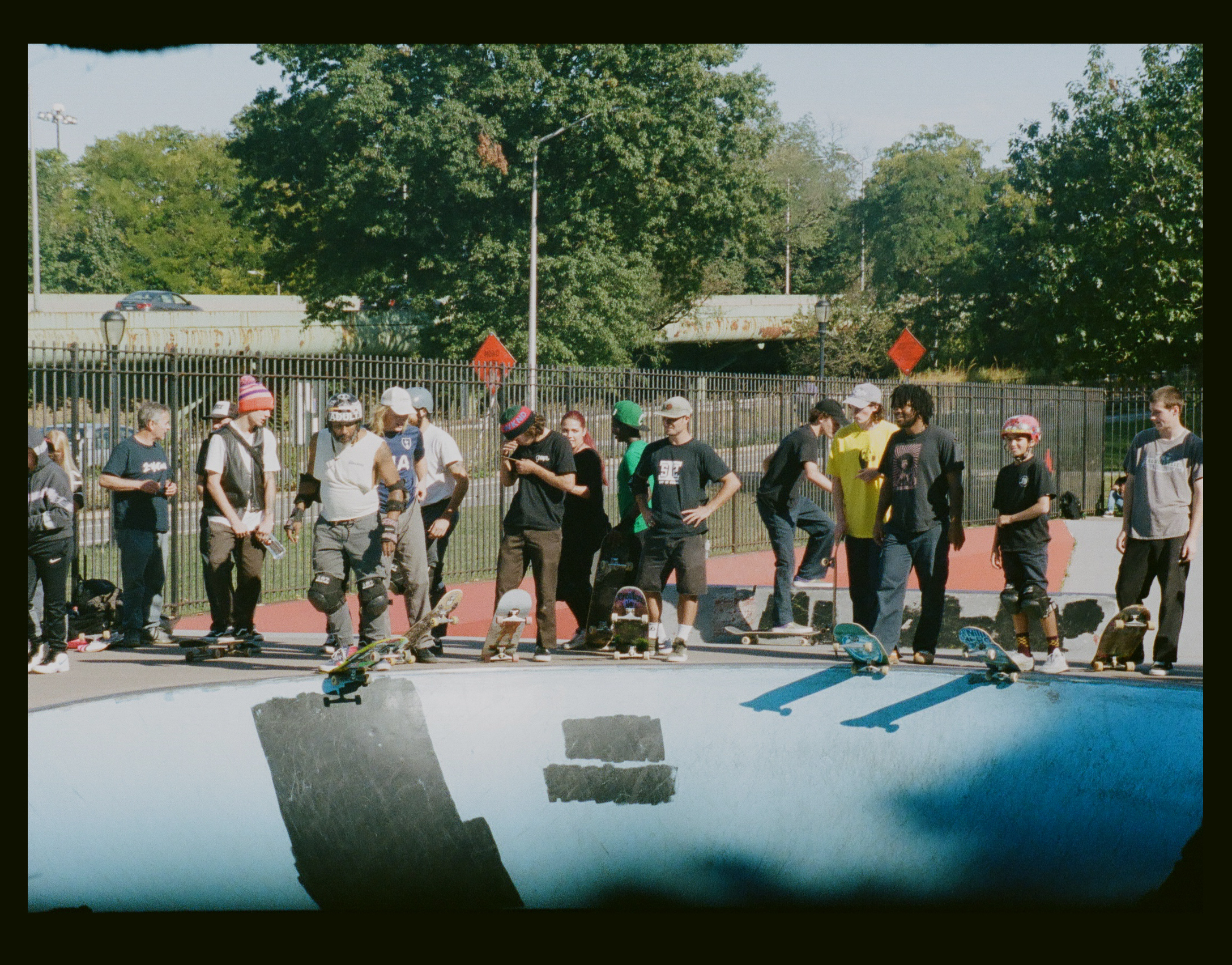
NYC Skateboard Coalition event at Owl's Head Skate Park - October, 2019

=== NYC Pool Series ===
NYC Skateboard Coalition is home to the NYC Pool Series, a skate event series taking place in skateparks throughout the city. The NYC Pool Series contributors include Ali Axelrod, organizing and ground crew; Jon "Pork Chop" Nicholson, DJ; and Andrew Gelles, emcee. Sponsors have included a spread of brands and companies including Uncle Funky's Skateshop, Substance Skatepark, Housewife Skateboards, Juice Magazine, Trophy griptape, Blake Sandberg's Severed Leg Productions, and others.

==== Riverside Skate Jam ====
After building a relationship with the Riverside Park Conservancy with the ramp repairs, the coalition was asked if it wanted to host events at the park. The NYC Skateboard Coalition held a Riverside Skate Jam at Riverside Skatepark from 2013 to 2018, stopping due to the concrete remodeling of the skatepark. The coalition has plans to resume the Skate Jam when the remodel is finished.

=== Andy Kessler Skatepark ===
In 2020, the NYC Skateboard Coalition worked alongside friends of Andy Kessler and Riverside park skateboard community members including Aaron Aniton, Jaime “Puppet Head” Affoumado, and Ivory Serra to lead a campaign that resulted in the renaming of the Riverside Skatepark to Andy Kessler Skatepark to honor the advocacy work Kessler did in his life for the skateboarding community.

=== Skatepark repair ===
The coalition worked with NYC Parks Department to get repairs done to Owls Head Skatepark in 2017.

=== 3 foot rule ===
The NYC Skateboard Coalition lobbied NYC Parks Department for larger skateparks. The 3 foot rule limited skateparks in the NYC Parks Department to having no bigger than 3 feet high obstacles, which resulted in NYC having mostly small skateparks. After a successful lobbying campaign, NYC Parks Department abandoned the 3 foot rule, allowing for larger skateparks.

=== Skatepark clean-ups ===
Since its inception, the coalition has participated in skatepark clean-ups, a meet-up where a group of civic-minded skaters, often joined by non-skaters and family, get together and clean-up a skatepark. Beginning informally in the mid-2010s at Riverside Skatepark, the skate coalition now hosts N.Y.C Department of Parks and Recreation approved clean-ups throughout New York City. The organization has cleaned up at the following NYC skateparks:

- Pier 62 Skatepark - Chelsea, Manhattan
- Fat Kid Golconda Skatepark - Dumbo, Brooklyn
- Owl's Head Skatepark - Bay Ridge, Brooklyn
- Riverside Skatepark - Upper West Side, Manhattan

== Awards ==
In 2020, Partnership for Parks recognized the NYC Skateboard Coalition at the It's My Park Awards Reception, awarding the coalition for "Outstanding Service, Activism, and Collaboration" for its work cleaning up Golconda Skate Park, led by Clarke and Casey Appledorn.
