= Skateparks in New York City =

A list of skateparks in New York City.

== List of parks by borough ==
=== The Bronx ===
- Bronx Skate Park (Allerton Skatepark)
- Bruckner Skatepark (a.k.a. Throggs Neck)
- Rev. T. Wendell Foster Skatepark
- Playground 52 LII
- River Avenue Skate Park
- Van Cortlandt Skatepark
- Williamsbridge Oval Skatepark

=== Brooklyn ===
- Betsy Head Skatepark
- Brower Park Skate Park
- Canarsie Park Skatepark
- City Line Park
- Cooper Park Skatepark
- Golconda Skatepark (a.k.a. Fat Kid)
- Martinez Playground Skate Park (a.k.a. Blue Park & Blue floor)
- McCarren Park Skatepark
- Millennium Skate Park a.k.a. Owl's Head Skate Park
- Robert Venable Skate Park
- Rudd Skate Park
- St. Mary's Playground
- Seba Playground Skate Park
- Sgt. William Dougherty Skate Park
- Substance Skatepark
- Thomas Greene Park Skate Park
- Vans Skate Space 198
- Washington Park Skate Park (a.k.a. MS 51)

=== Manhattan ===
- LES Skatepark
- Pier 62 Skatepark
- Highbridge Skatepark
- Andy Kessler Skatepark formerly Riverside Skatepark
- Thomas Jefferson Park Skate Park
- Tompkins Square Park
- TriBeCa Skatepark
- Open Road Skate Park (Summer only)

=== Queens ===
- Astoria Skate Plaza
- Far Rockaway Skate Park
- Flushing Meadows Corona Skate Park
- Forest Park Skate Park
- London Planetree Skate Park and Playground
- Rockaway Skate Park
- Far Rockaway Skate Park

=== Staten Island ===
- 5050 Skatepark
- Ben Soto Skate Park
- Faber Skate Park
