= Pier 62 Skatepark =

Skate park in Manhattan, New York

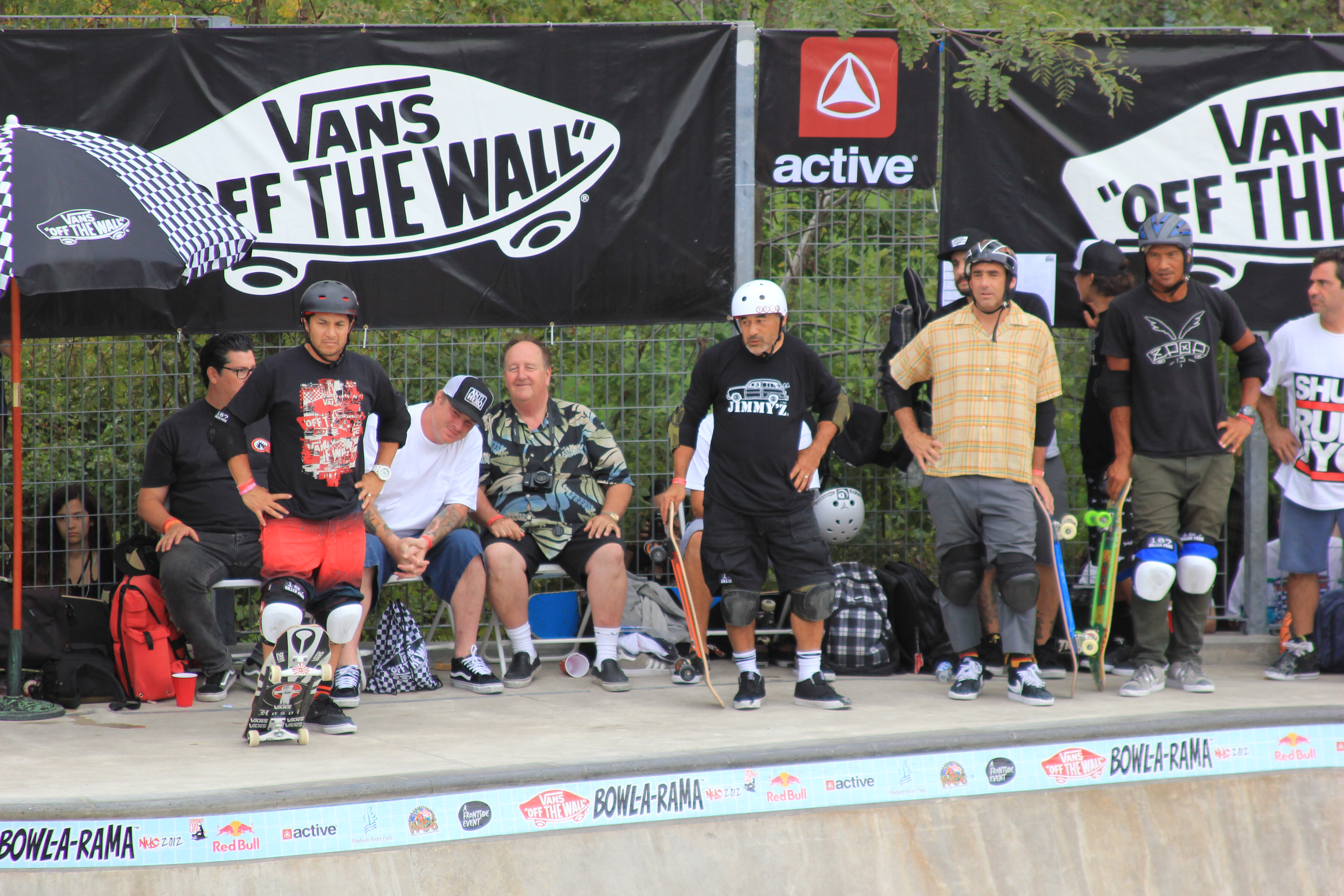
- Vans Bowl-A-Rama - 2012
- Interactive map of Pier 62 Skatepark
- Type: Skatepark
- Location: Chelsea, Manhattan, New York City
- Coordinates: 40.748777°N 74.009422°W
- Area: 15,000 Sq. Ft.
- Opened: May 2010
- Operator: State of New York; City of New York; Hudson River Park Trust
- Open: 8:00 AM to dusk
- Status: Open
- Terrain: Concrete

Pier 62 Skatepark is a public skatepark located in the Chelsea neighborhood of Manhattan, New York City. Opened in 2010, the skatepark is located on Pier 62 within Hudson River Park overlooking Hudson River. Pier 62 Skatepark is New York City's only modern, full-sized, concrete vert transition skatepark. It is accessed from Hudson River Park's 22nd Street entrance.

== History ==
When it opened in May 2010, Pier 62 Skatepark was the first modern full size vert concrete transition skatepark in New York City. The Skatepark was designed and built by California Skateparks/Site Design Group.

== Terrain ==
Pier 62 Skatepark is an oval shaped concrete skatepark of about 15,000 sq ft. Its main features are a 10-foot-deep pool, a flow area and a street section. The pool has three sections, a 6-ft shallow end, a 6-1/2 ft pocket and a 10 ft deep end that just goes to vert.

The flow area offers a wide variety of banks, transitions, hips and roll in spots including an over vert clam-shell, the flow area is 9 Ft. at its deepest with vert.

The street area features a 2 ft Wedge and a 3 ft Start Box, the Intermediate Fun Box including a 24 ft Ledge, a Kinked Flat Rail, and an 18 ft Ollie Ledge.

== Construction ==
Pier 62 Skatepark is notable as it is built on a challenging site, directly on top of Pier 62 in the Hudson River. It is constructed of a custom structural foam/concrete foundation system with cast-in-place concrete and shotcrete construction.

== Events ==
In August 2012 Converse hosted the Converse City Carnage event. In October 2012, Vans hosted the Bowl-Arama event.

== Gallery of photos from Pier 62 Skatepark ==
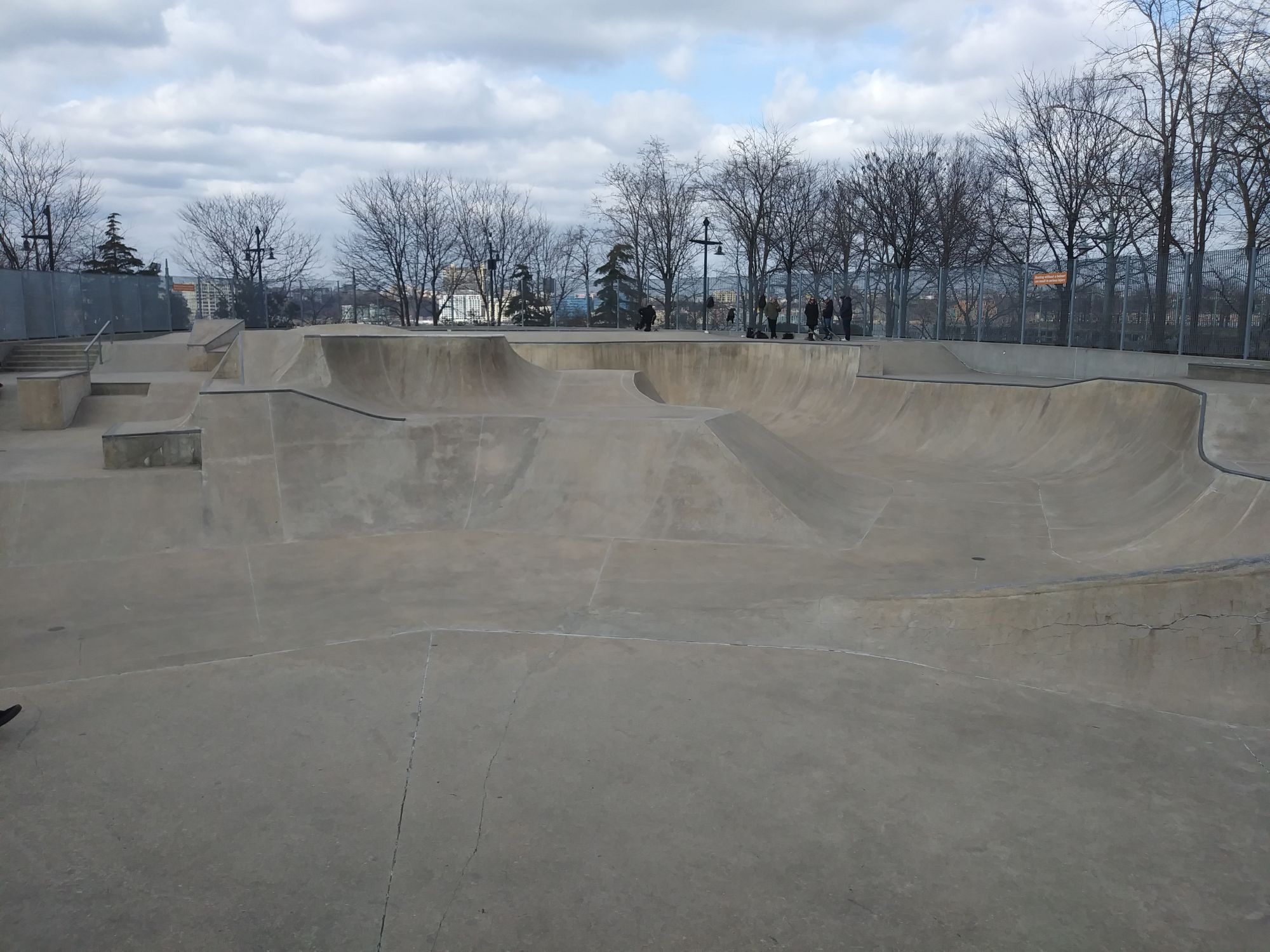
Pier 62 Skatepark Looking West

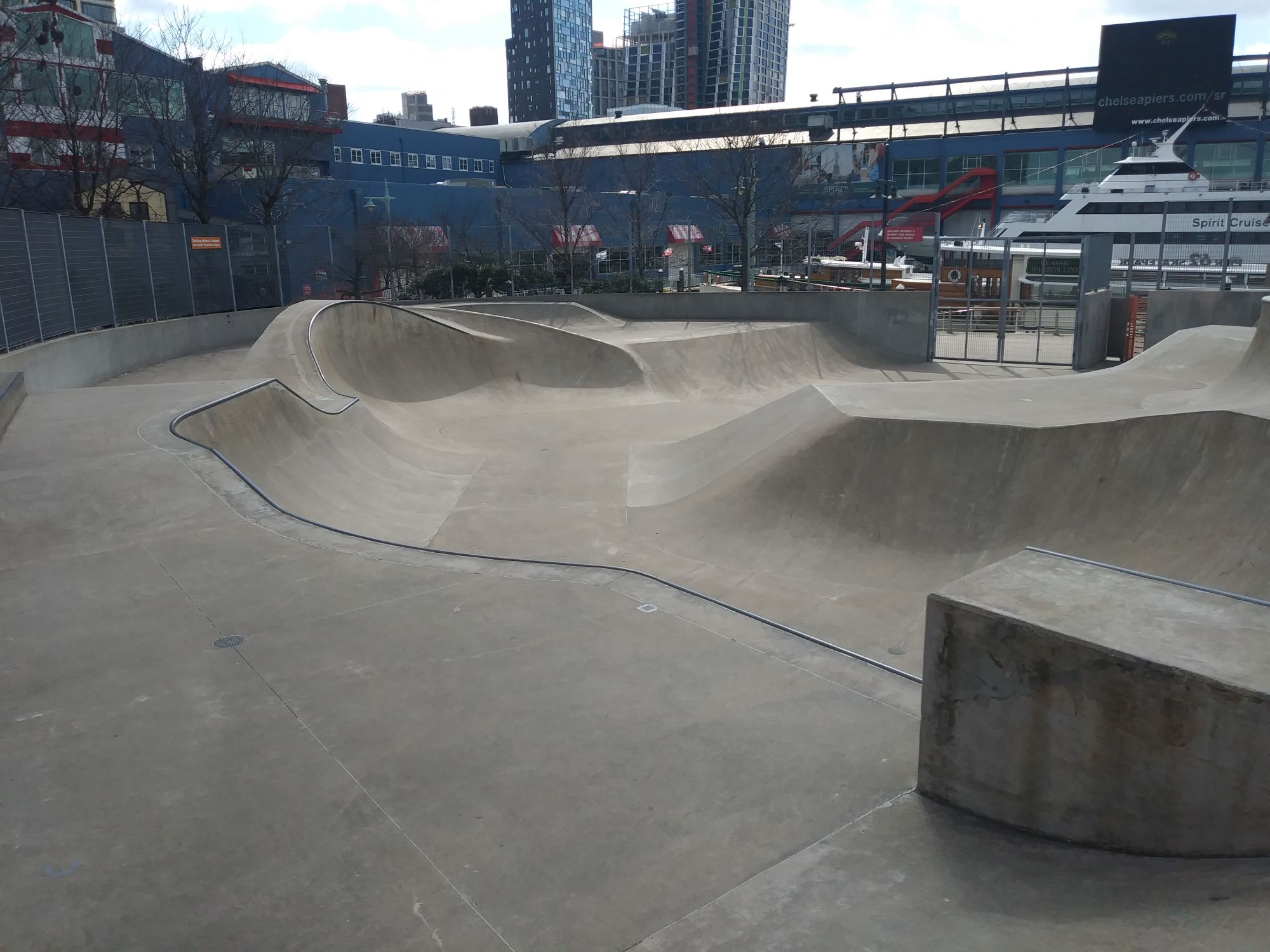
Pier 62 Skatepark Flow Area Looking South

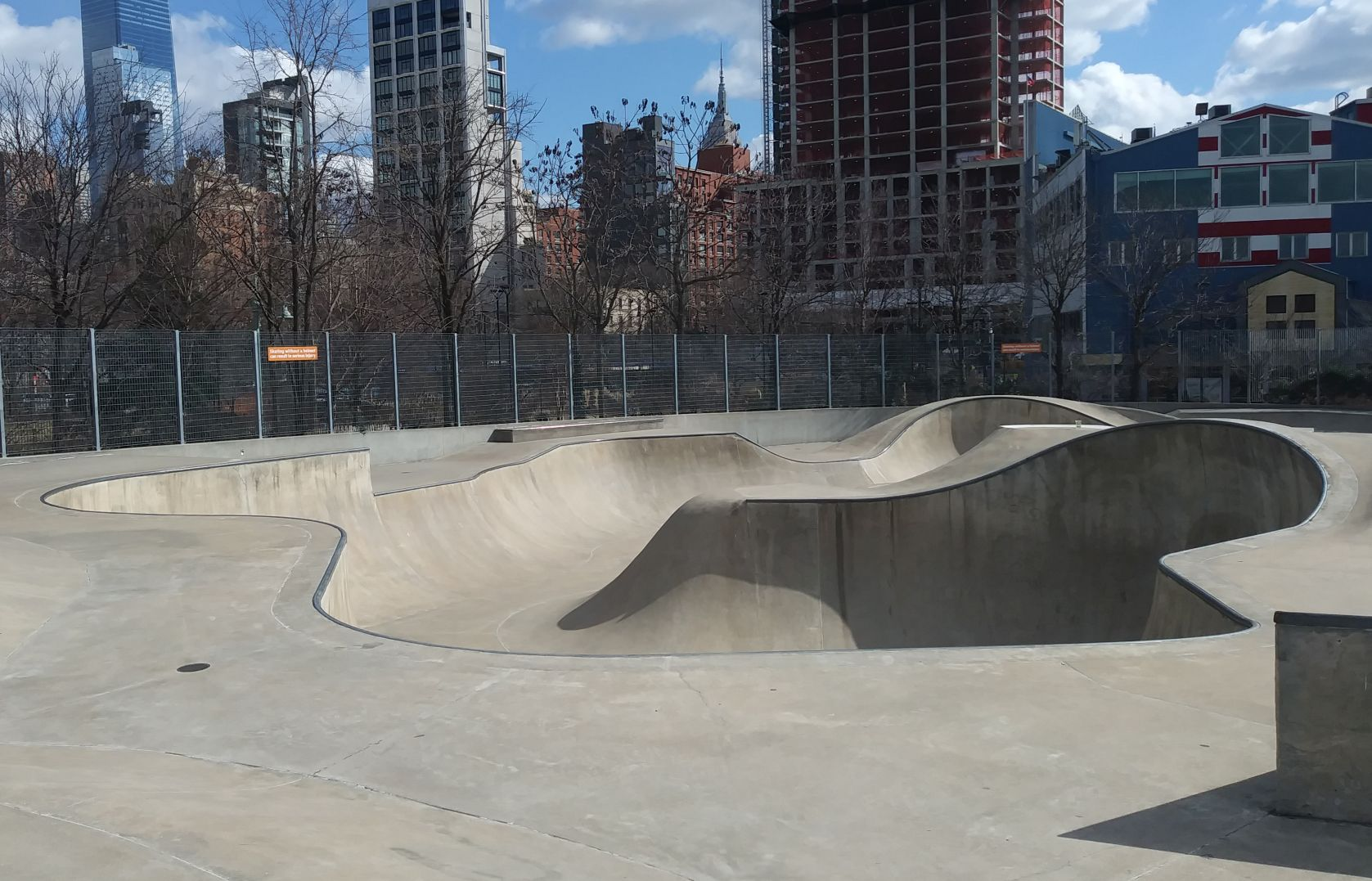
Pier 62 Skatepark Flow Area Looking East

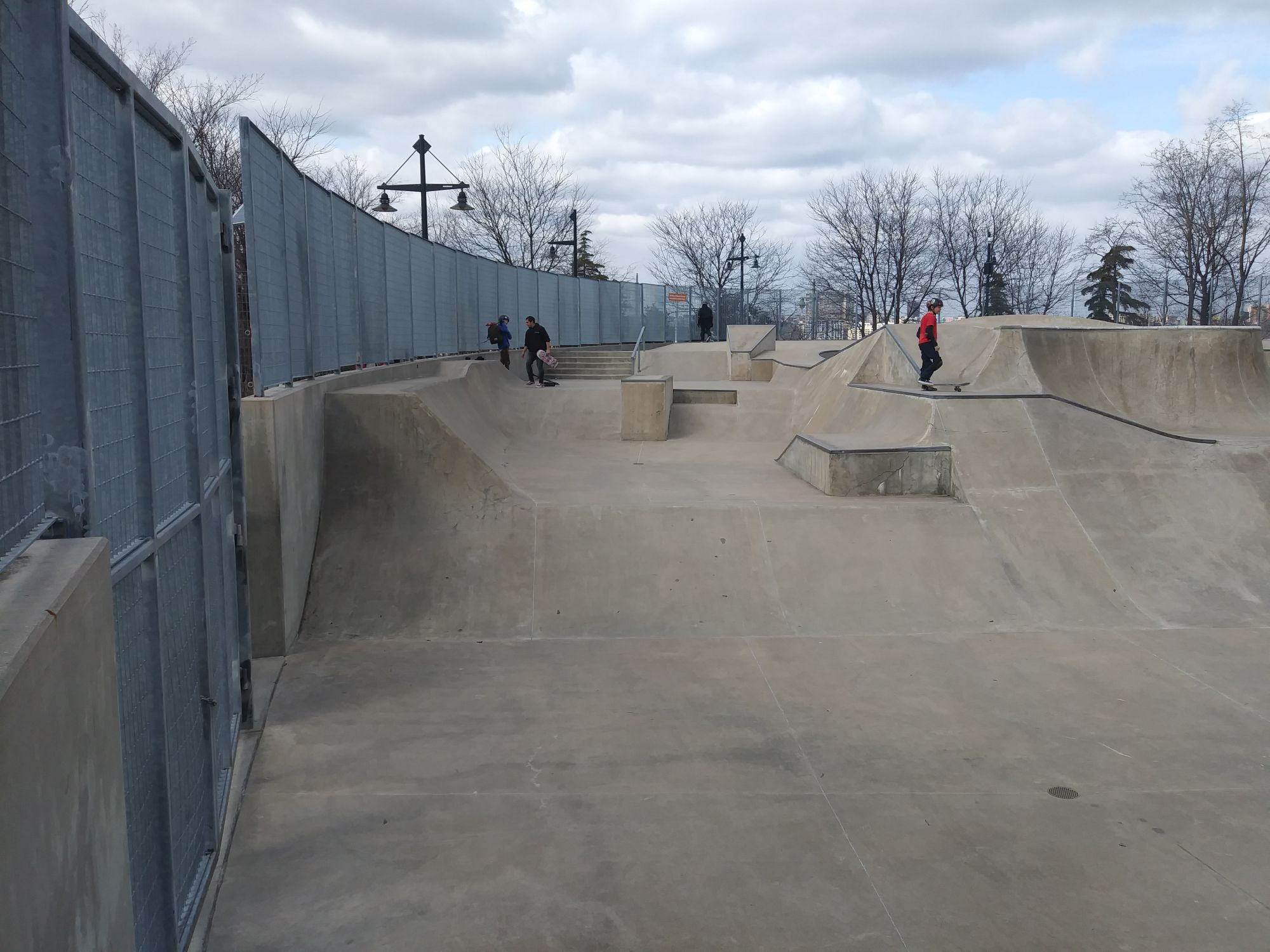
Pier 62 Skatepark Street Area Looking West

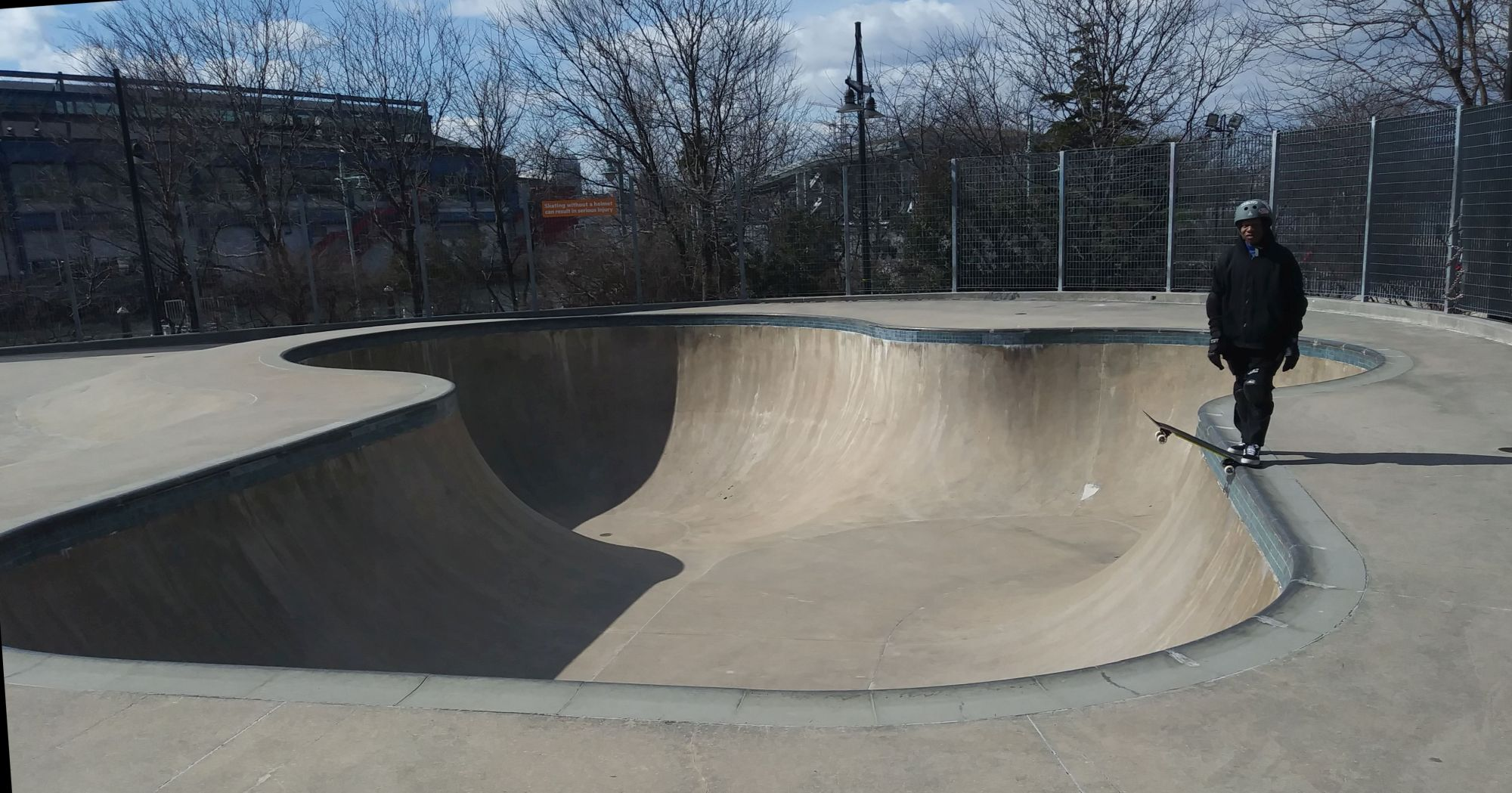
Pier 62 Skatepark Pool Looking West

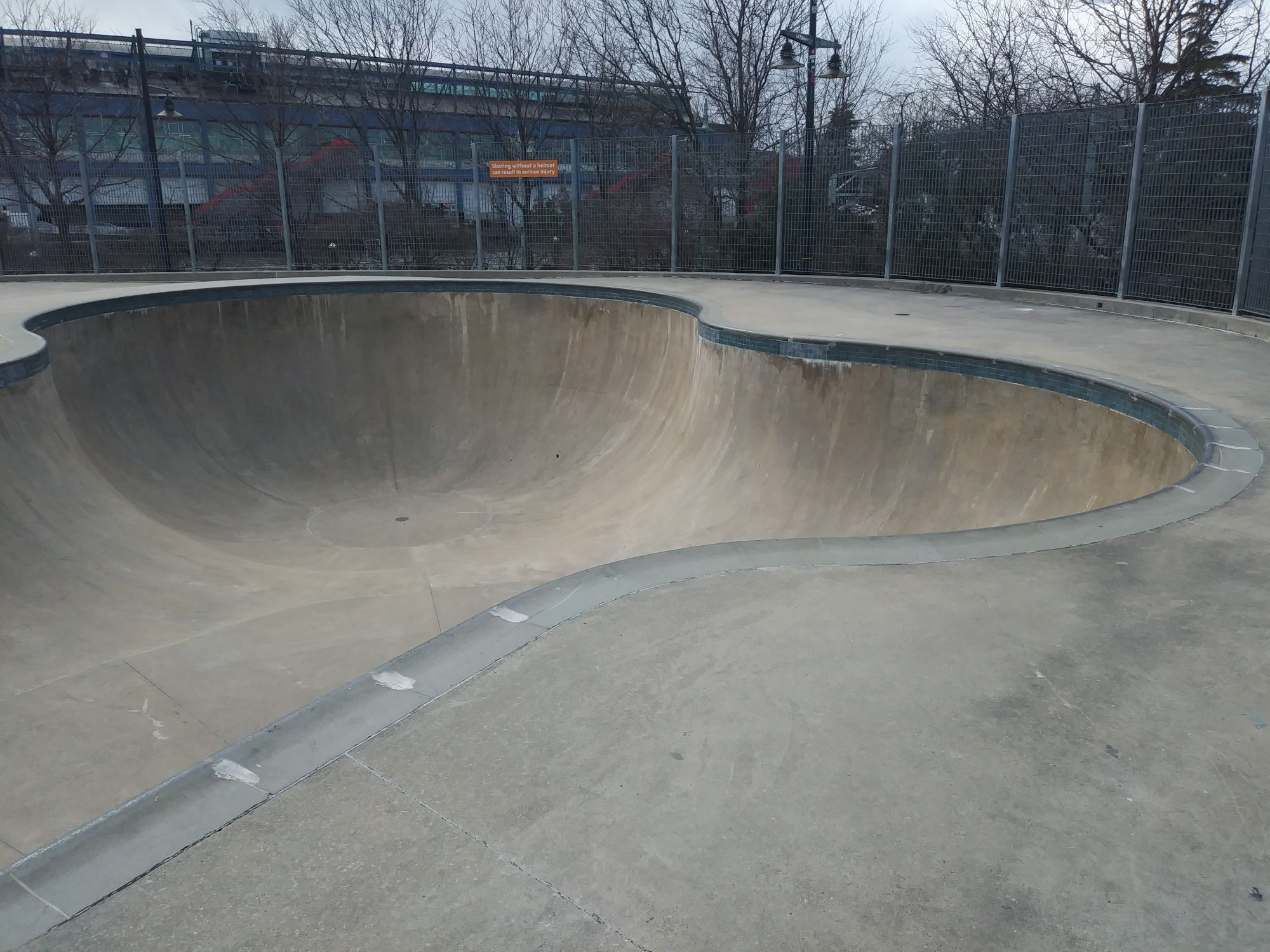
Pier 62 Skatepark Pool Looking South

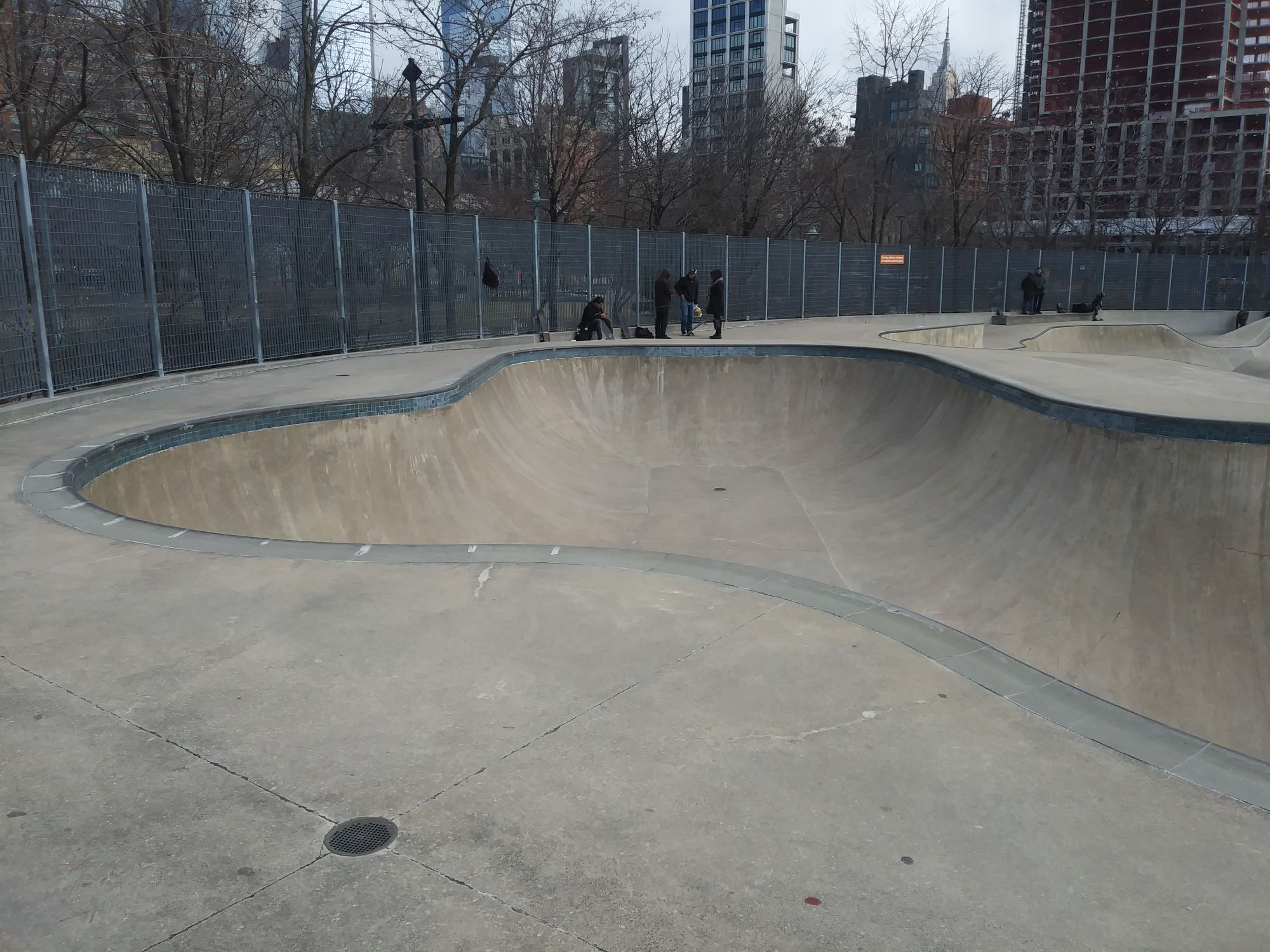
Pier 62 Skatepark Pool Looking East

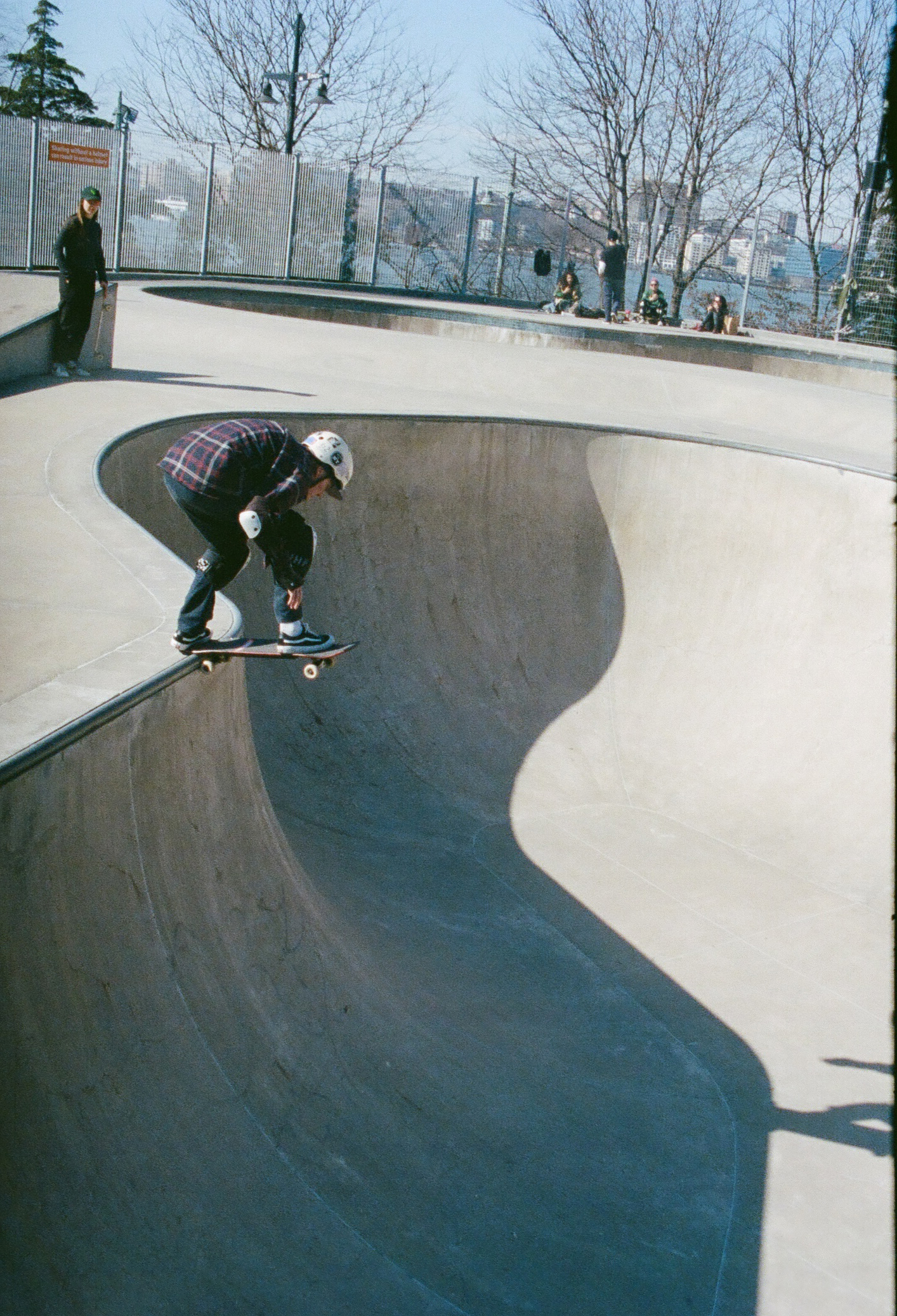
Skater dropping in at 62 - 2019

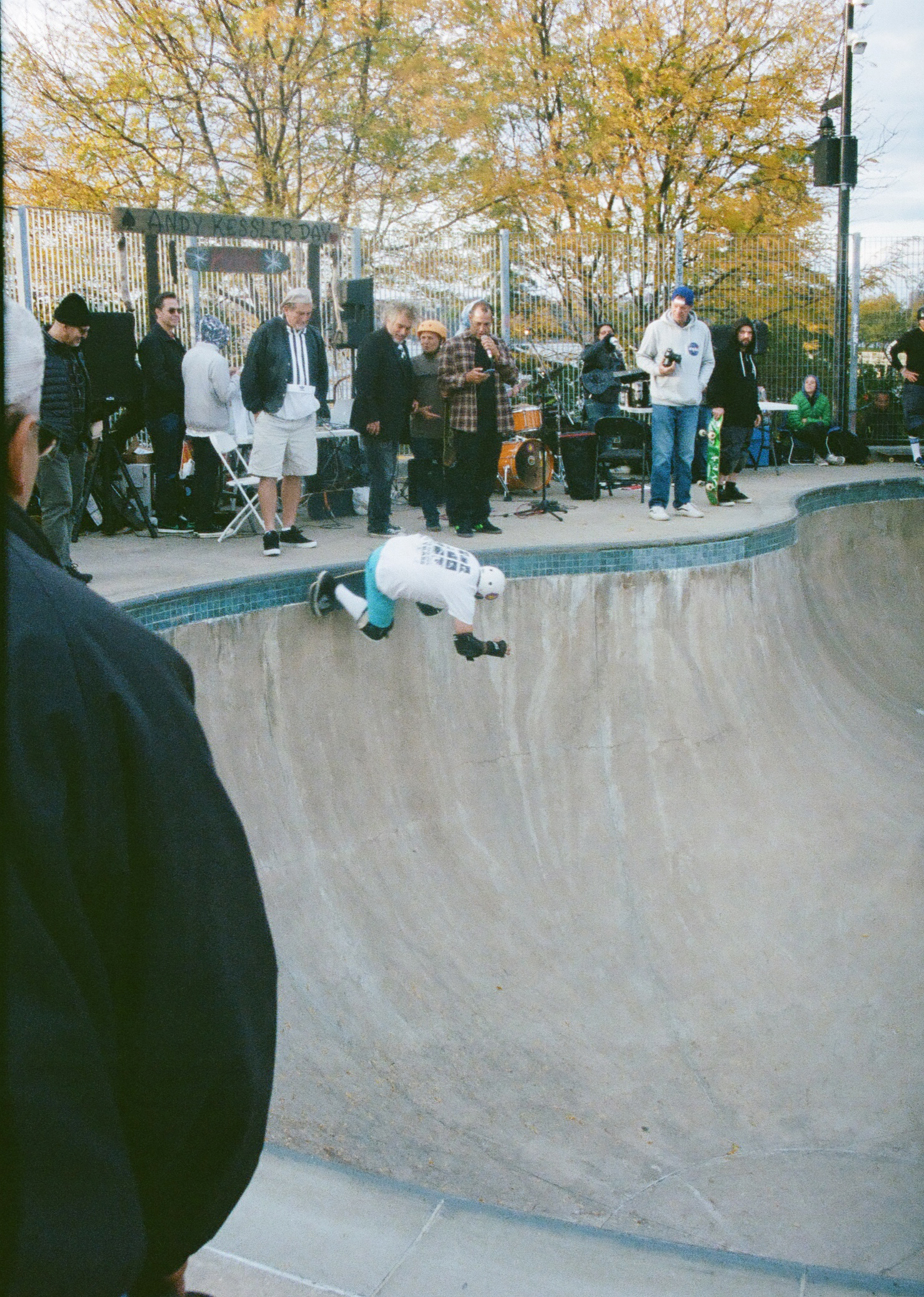
Andy Kessler Day - 2019

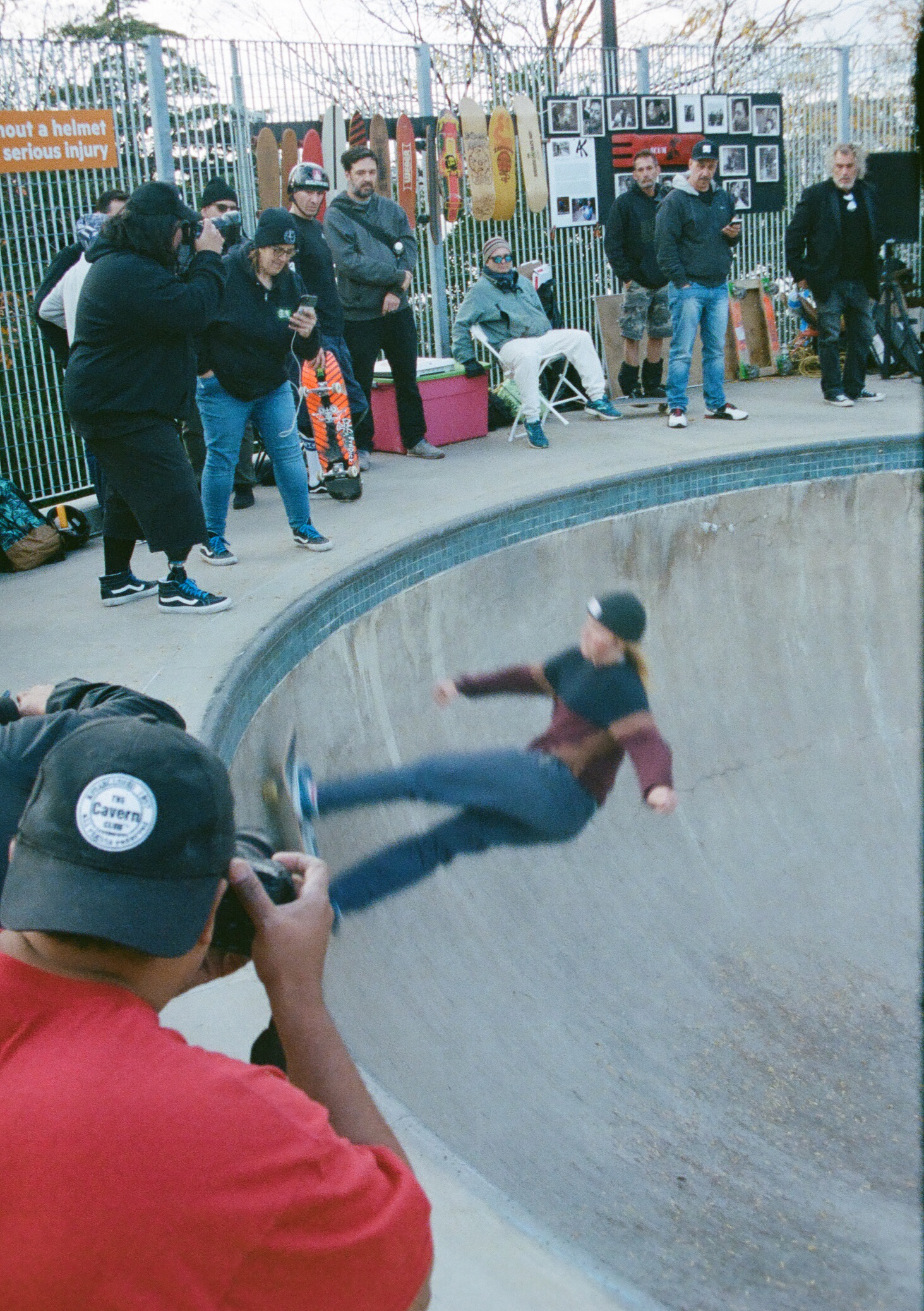
Andy Kessler Day - 2019

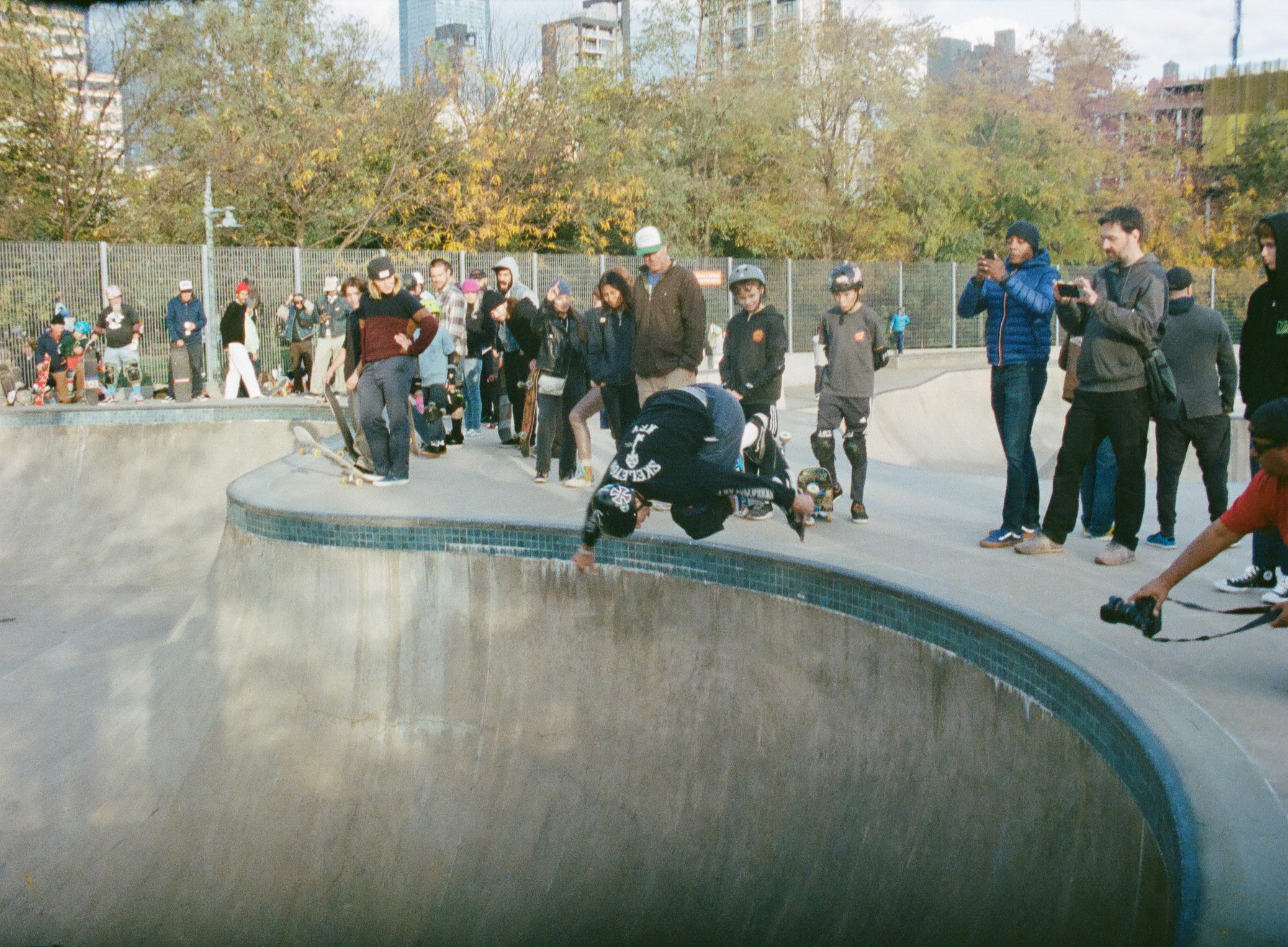
Andy Kessler Day - 2019

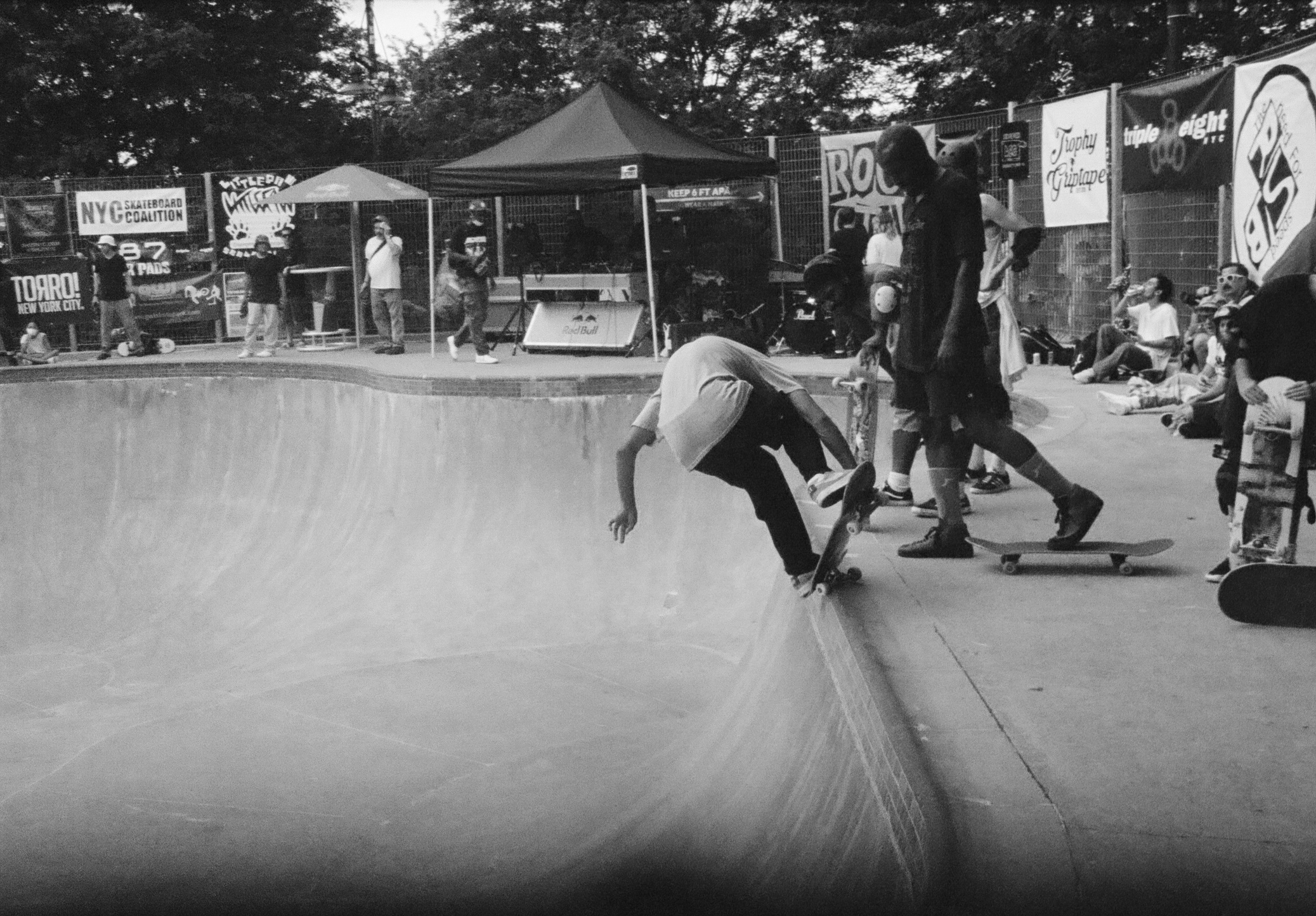
NYC Pool Series 2021 - hosted by NYC Skateboard Coalition
