= Andy Kessler (skateboarder) =

Greek-American skateboarder (1961–2009)

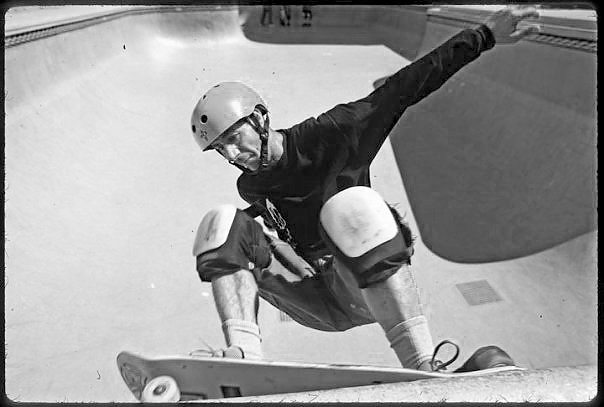
- Andy Kessler skating in an abandoned Asbury Park, New Jersey, pool. Photo: Charlie Samuels
- Born: June 11, 1961; Athens, Greece
- Died: August 10, 2009 (aged 48); New York City, US
- Occupation: Skateboarder
- Years active: 1976–2009

Andrew Kessler (June 11, 1961 – August 10, 2009) was a Greek-born American skateboarder, skatepark builder, and prominent member of a loose-knit collective of skateboarders and graffiti artists called the Soul Artists of Zoo York. Kessler is featured in the documentary Deathbowl to Downtown.

== Early life ==
Andy and his twin sister were born in Athens, Greece, adopted by an American family and raised on the Upper West Side of Manhattan, New York. He started skateboarding in the early 1970s in Central Park, on a short hill near to its West 69th Street entrance. He soon joined a group of inner city kids congregating around "the bandshell," though the scene was primarily based in the Rumsey Playfield playground directly behind Central Park's Naumburg Bandshell, inside the park at West 71st Street, the street on which Kessler was raised. The steep paths of nearby Riverside Park also became a favorite haunt of Kessler and other skateboarders.

== Skateboarding career ==
As skateboard technology advanced through the introduction of urethane wheels and specially designed skateboard trucks replaced makeshift rollerskate trucks, Kessler joined other New York kids in developing new forms and styles of skating, including the use of ramps—often consisting of plywood billboard leaned against a park wall or building—to "go vertical" and improvise other acrobatic tricks.

Several members of the Soul Artists, an innovative New York City graffiti crew, were hanging out at "the bandshell," though the Soul Artists were actually founded by Marc "Ali" Edmonds and began elsewhere in Central Park. Some of the graffiti writers were also skateboarders, and Kessler, emerging as a leading figure among city boarders, helped found an associated group that became known as the skateboard crew Soul Artists of Zoo York.

Graffiti writers such as Zephyr, Crunch, and Haze were also in this crew, and the elaborate skateboards that they crafted in 1979, bearing the graffiti-styled lettering "ZOO YORK" in the same "cross" style as Santa Monica's "DOG TOWN," were the first-ever use of what is now a famous trademark employed by Ecko Unlimited.

Featured in trade catalogues and articles in skateboard magazines such as Thrasher and Transworld Skateboarding, Kessler became a guiding force in the design, development, funding and building of "skateparks" citywide, nationwide and eventually worldwide. He was also a community youth activist who worked with city teens to better themselves, their circumstances, and their urban environment, often in conjunction with the creation of free skating facilities to expend their energies on.

== Skate parks ==
=== Andy Kessler Skatepark (formerly Riverside Skatepark) ===
Kessler headed up efforts to create a skatepark in Riverside Park, which was dedicated by New York City Parks Commissioner Henry J. Stern on August 21, 1996. Built with the help of teenagers from Harlem and the Upper West Side, Riverside Skatepark became the city's first municipal park facility designed and constructed solely for skateboarders and rollerbladers. One of the top five applications in the National Park Service's "Innovation in Recreation" Grant Program, the project received a $50,000 grant, which was matched by the New York City Parks Department, the City Parks Foundation, and local lumber, pipe and paint suppliers. Kessler supervised twenty Manhattan teenagers who, after participating in a workshop conducted by the Alternatives to Violence Project, spent five weeks building Riverside Skate Park. The result is one of the most creative recreation facilities in New York City, which transformed an obsolete and disused playground, and provided thousands of city kids with a place of their own to skate.

In June 2019, the New York City Department of Parks and Recreation broke ground on a concrete remodel of the Riverside Skatepark. In 2019 after the skatepark groundbreaking, local skaters, volunteers, and friends of Kessler petitioned the local elected officials and Community Board 7 to rename the skatepark after Kessler. In March 2020, Manhattan Community Board 7 approved the renaming of Riverside Park to Andy Kessler Skatepark.

=== Owl's Head Skate park ===
Opened in 2001 and designed by Kessler, Millennium Skate Park in Bay Ridge, Brooklyn was the first concrete skatepark built in Brooklyn.

=== Other skate parks ===
Kessler also headed up the design and construction of skateparks in New York's boroughs outside Manhattan; in Greenport, Long Island; California and other states and in the Caribbean Islands. He designed and hand built, with the help of two friends, a skatepark for the Youth Center on Rock City Road in Woodstock, New York.

== Death ==
Kessler died in 2009, from complications due to an allergic reaction to a wasp sting he suffered near Montauk, New York, where he was spending summer time surfing and helping a friend get off drugs.
