= Andy Kessler Skatepark =

Skatepark

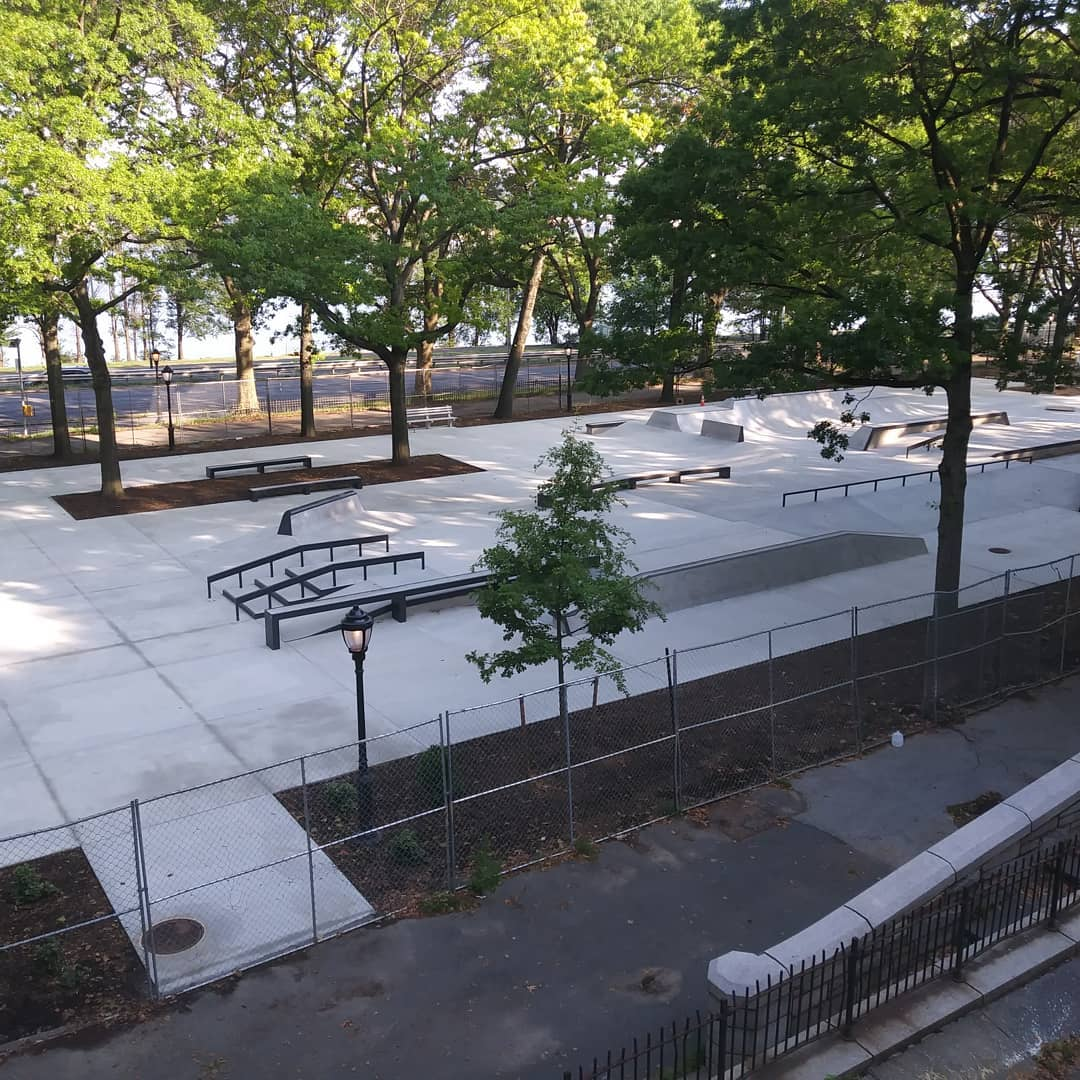
- Andy Kessler Skatepark looking North West
- Interactive map of Andy Kessler Skatepark
- Type: Skatepark
- Location: Upper West Side, Manhattan
- Coordinates: 40°48′18″N 73°58′14″W
- Opened: August 1996
- Operator: NYC Parks
- Status: Under reconstruction
- Terrain: Wooden ramps

Andy Kessler Skatepark, formerly Riverside Skatepark, is a skatepark located in Riverside Park on the Upper West Side of Manhattan, New York City. Riverside Skatepark is notable as the first full-sized public skatepark in Manhattan, originally designed and built by renowned skateboarder and skatepark builder Andy Kessler.

== Terrain ==
Completed in 2019, the Andy Kessler Skatepark is a concrete skatepark built by California Skateparks consisting of a street plaza and a pool. It maintains a similar footprint as the original skatepark of approximately 30,000 square feet overall. The street plaza consists of stairs, ledges, rails, banks, bank to ledge and a 4 foot mini ramp. The pool is 11 foot deep in the deep end with 18" of vert, the shallow end is 6.5 feet deep. The pool has pool coping.

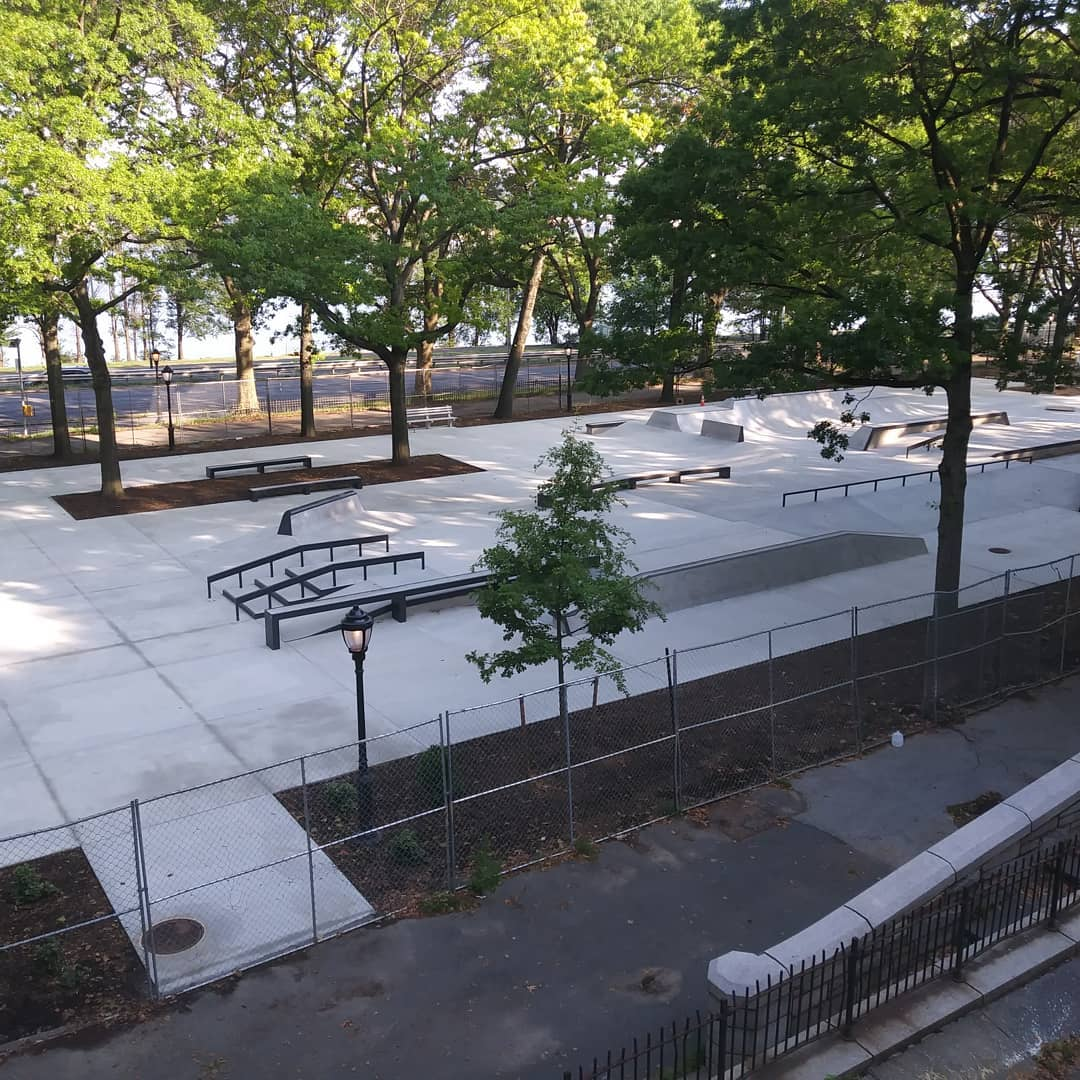
Street Plaza looking North West

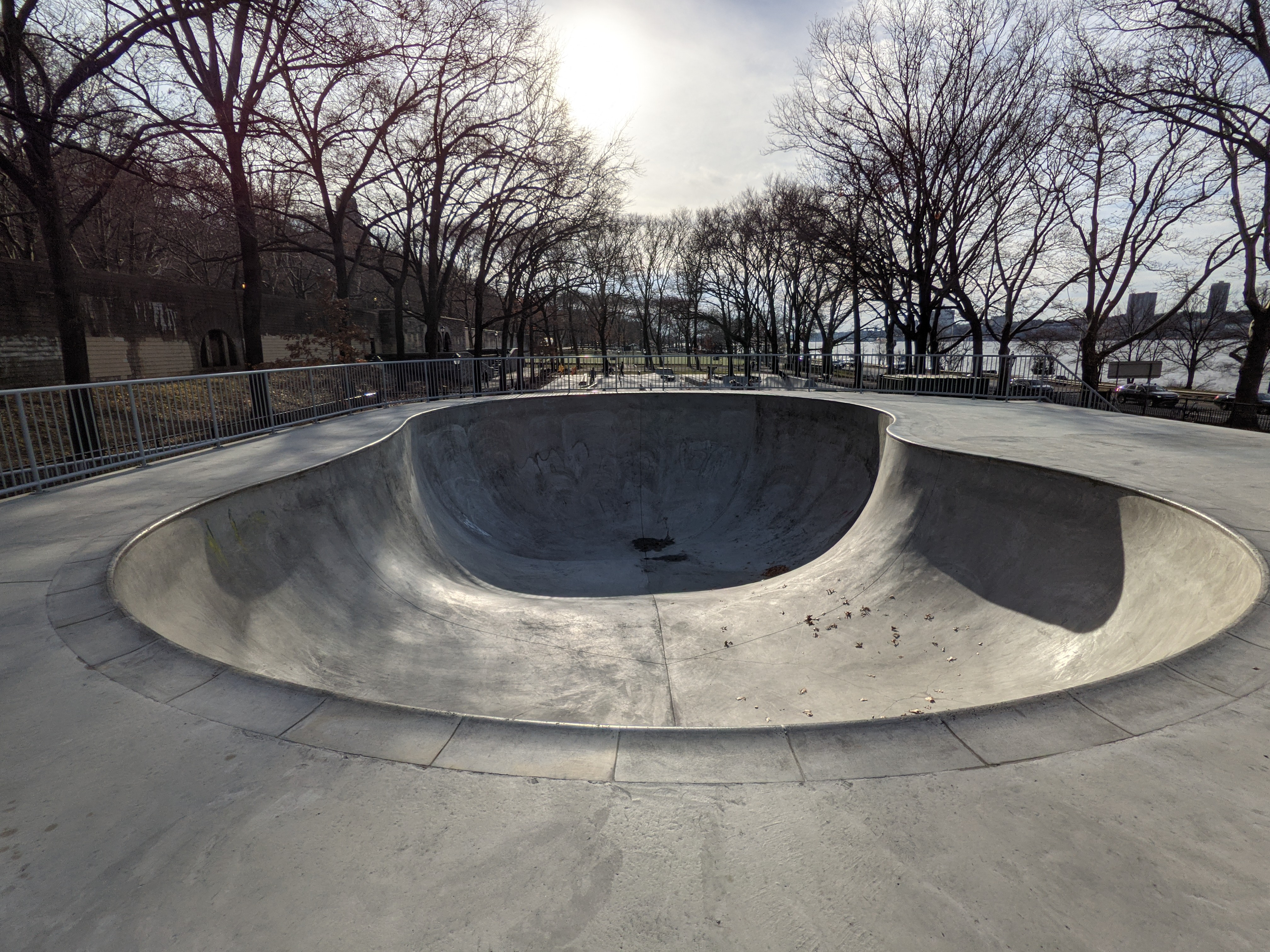
Pool looking South

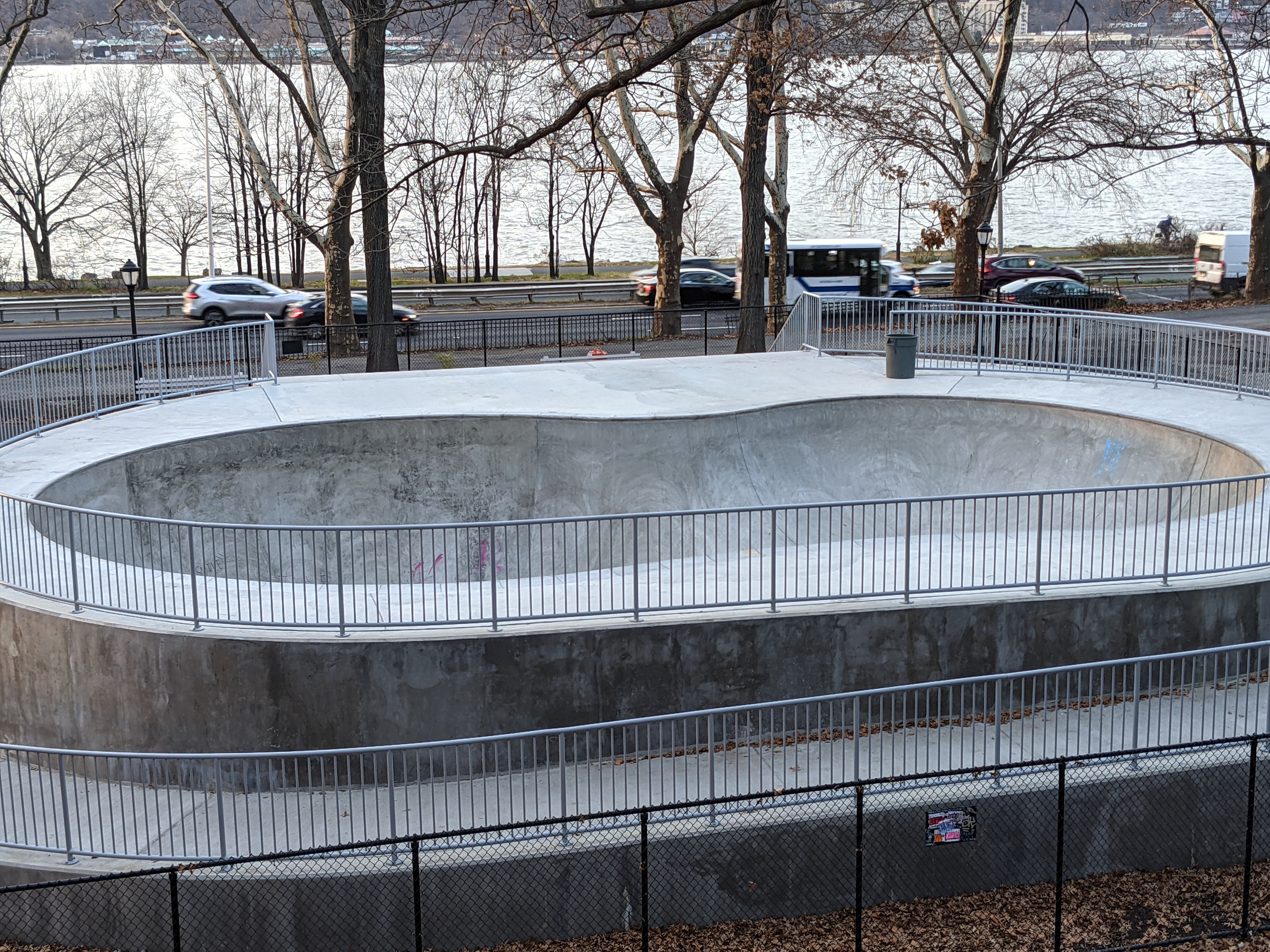
Pool looking West

== History ==
Built in 1995-1996, Riverside Skatepark was the first full-sized public skatepark in Manhattan. Andy Kessler headed up efforts to create Riverside Skatepark in collaboration with the New York City Parks Department and Riverside Parks Conservancy administrator Charles McKinney. The wooden park was built with the help of teenagers from Harlem and the Upper West Side. Riverside Skatepark opened in August 1996.

=== Preservation effort (2012-2018) ===
In 2012 Riverside skatepark had fallen into disrepair and had low attendance, Ian Clarke led a group of locals in an effort to preserve the historic skatepark. Clarke led permitted repairs with the cooperation of Riverside Parks Conservancy to repair and restore the historic ramps. Some of the many volunteers were Noel Korman, John O'Malley, Joe Rockman and Jimmy Soladay. To bring attention to the neglected skatepark, Clarke organized the annual Riverside Skate Jam event starting in 2013 with the cooperation of Riverside Parks Conservancy, help from other skateboarders and sponsorship from local skate shops and brands.

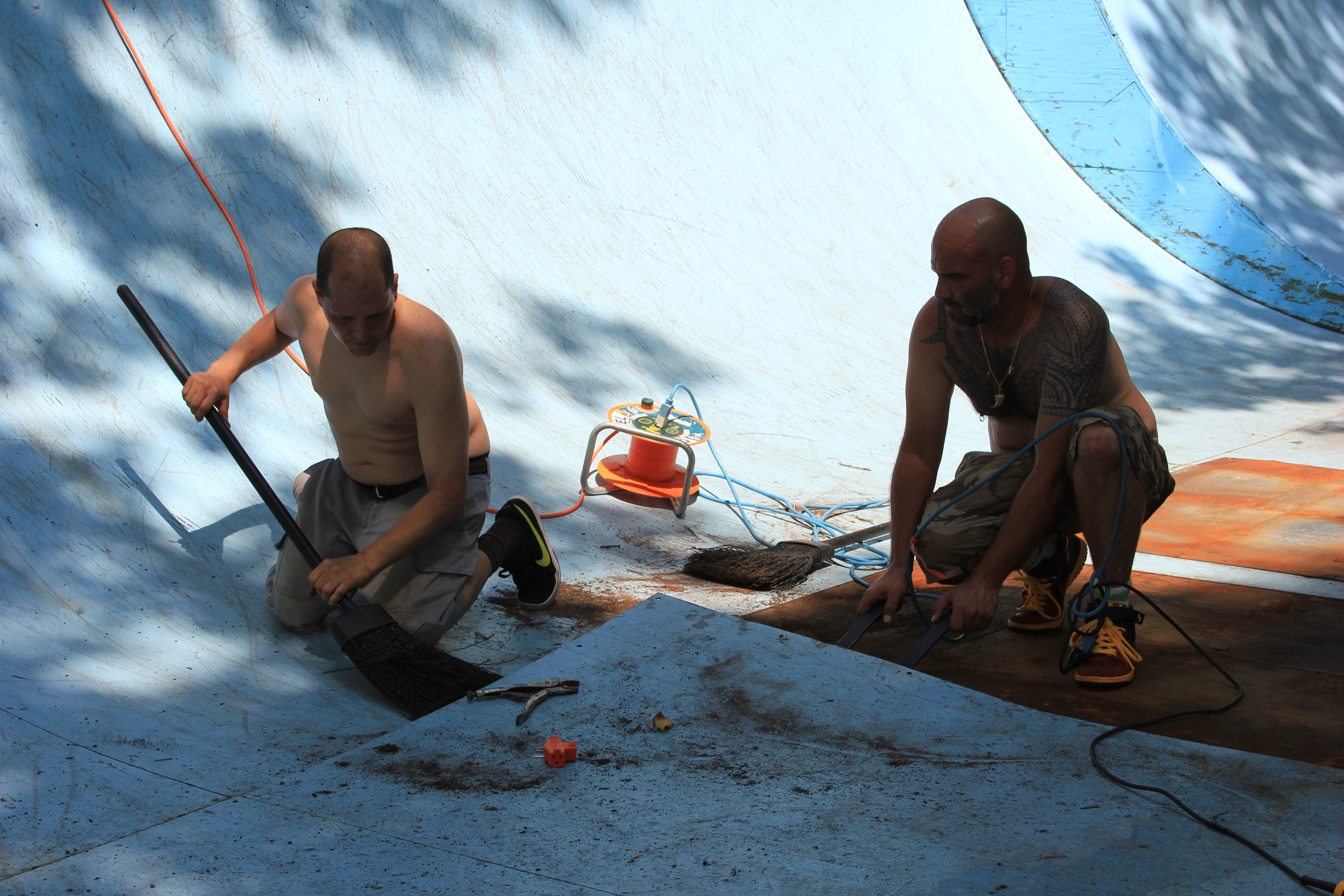
Riverside Skatepark ramp repairs repairs Joe Rockman Noel Korman June 29th 2013
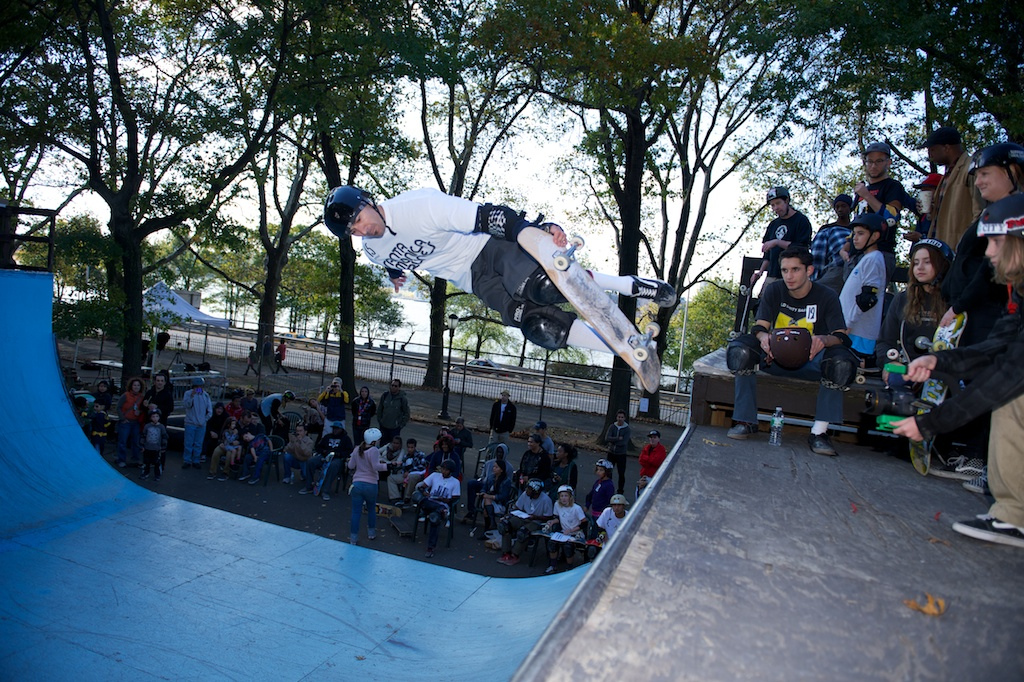
Riverside Skatepark Riverside Skate Jam with skater Shark Dog October 20th 2013

=== Concrete remodel & Renaming (2019-2021) ===
In June 2019, the New York City Department of Parks and Recreation broke ground on a concrete remodel of the Riverside Skatepark. In 2019 after the skatepark groundbreaking, local skaters, volunteers, and friends of Kessler, including members of NYC Skateboard Coalition, petitioned local elected officials and community board 7 to rename the skatepark after Andy Kessler. In March 2020, the community board approved the renaming. In October 2021 the new signage went up.

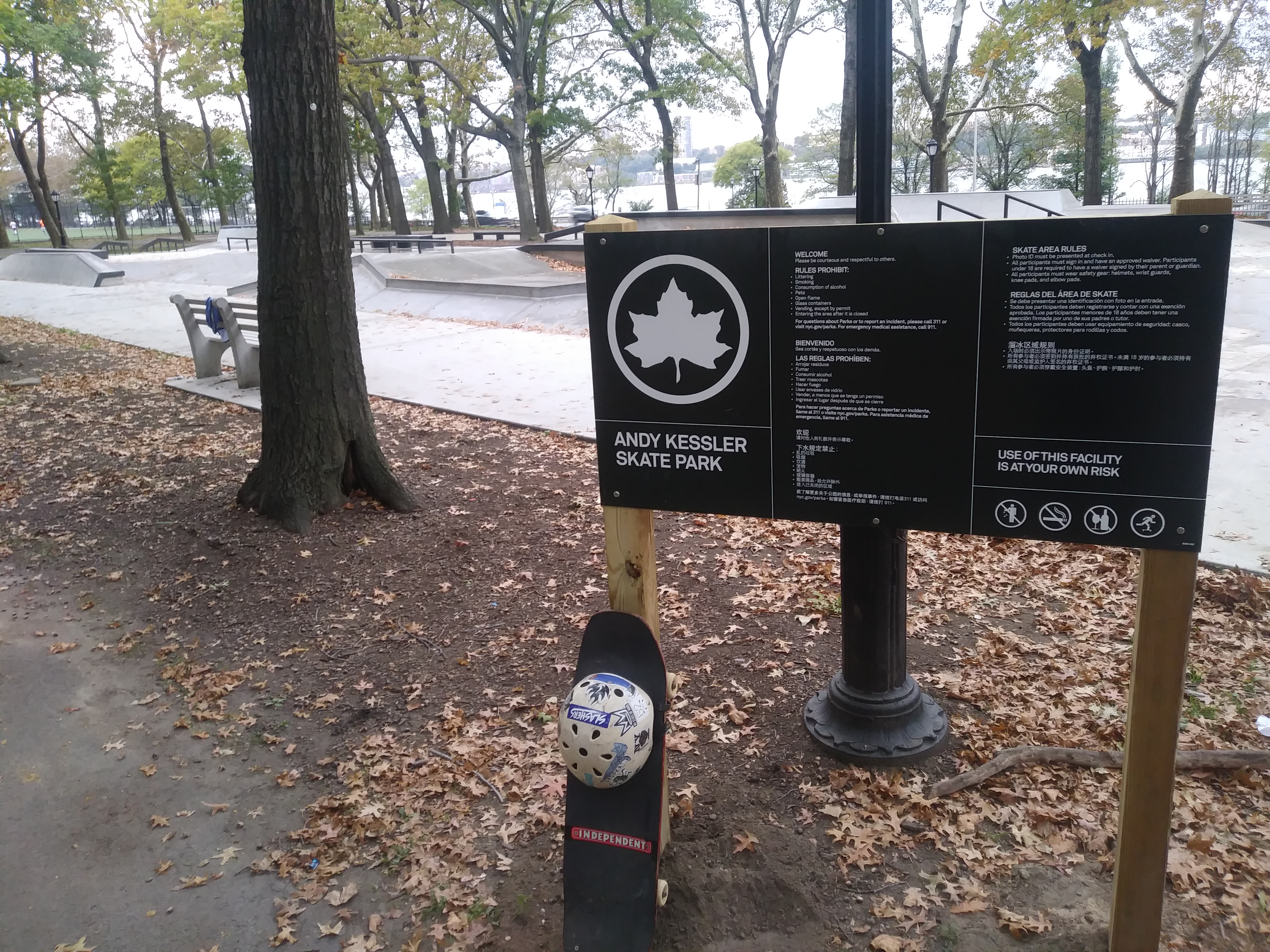
New Signage Andy Kessler Skatepark

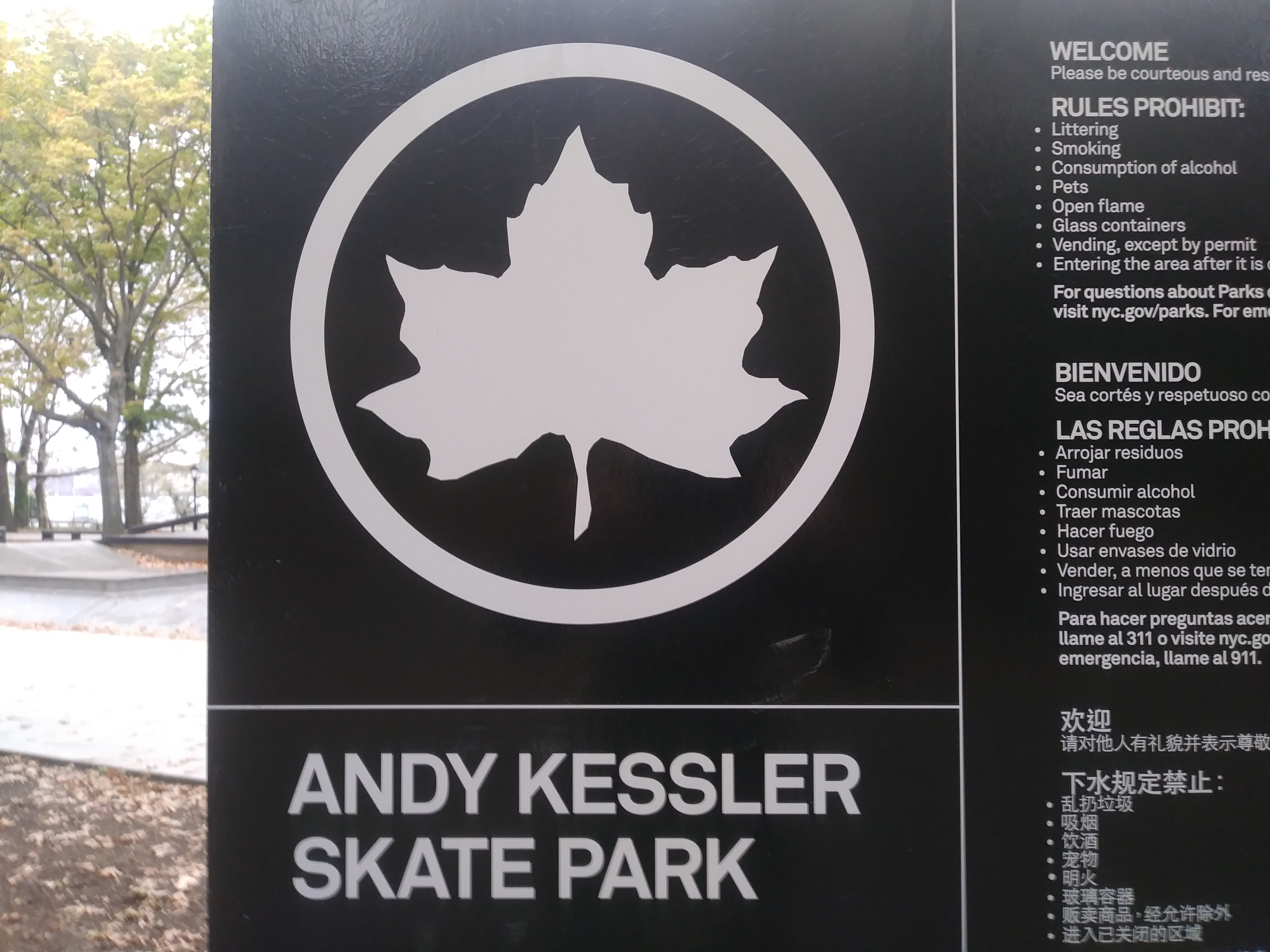
New Signage Andy Kessler Skatepark

=== Plaque (2022) ===
In December 2022 New York City Department of Parks and Recreation installed a plaque at the skatepark to honor Andy Kessler.

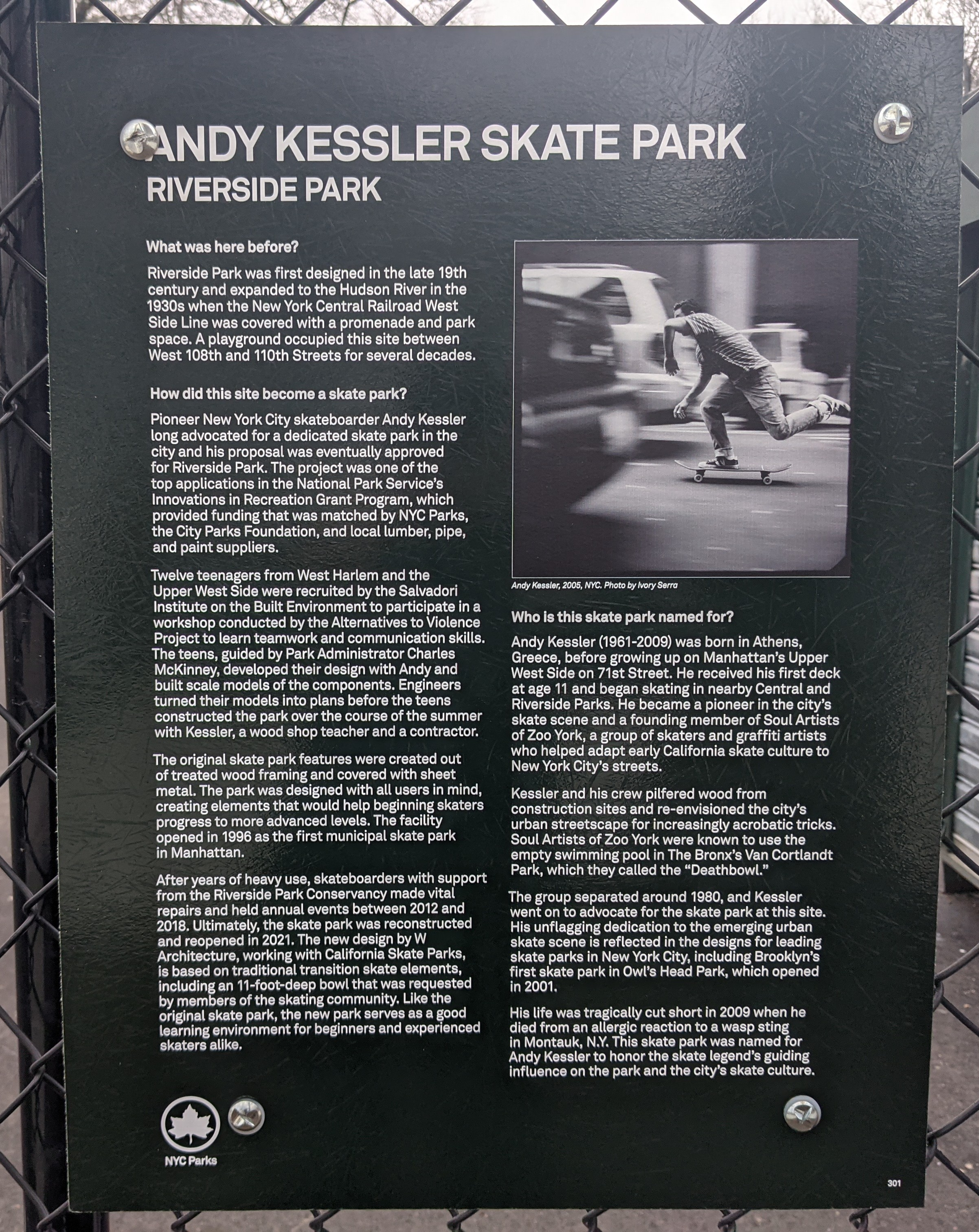
Andy Kessler Skatepark Plaque by NYC Parks Department

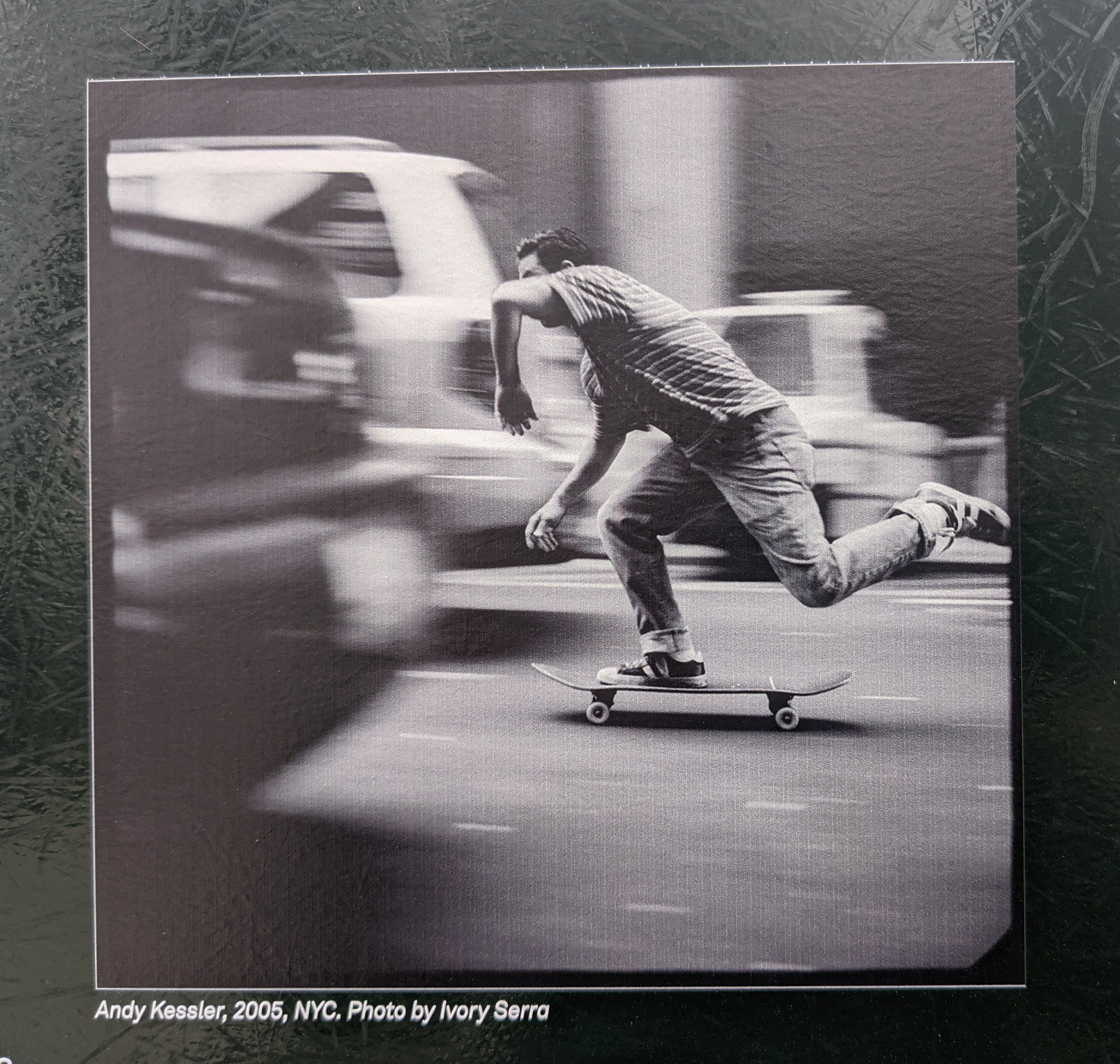
Andy Kessler Skatepark Plaque, Image of Andy Kessler by Photographer Ivory Serra

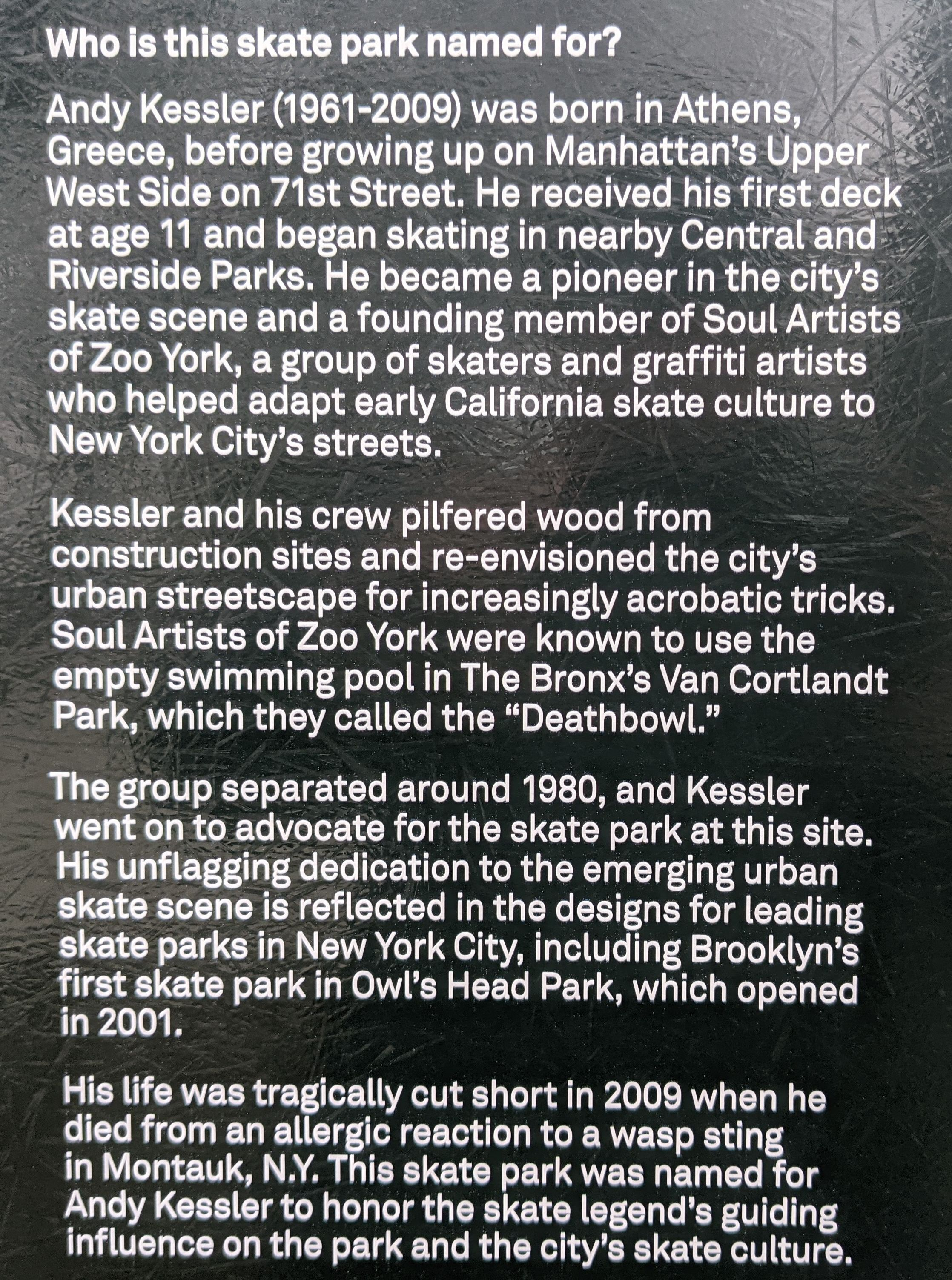
Andy Kessler Skatepark Plaque Andy Kessler Bio

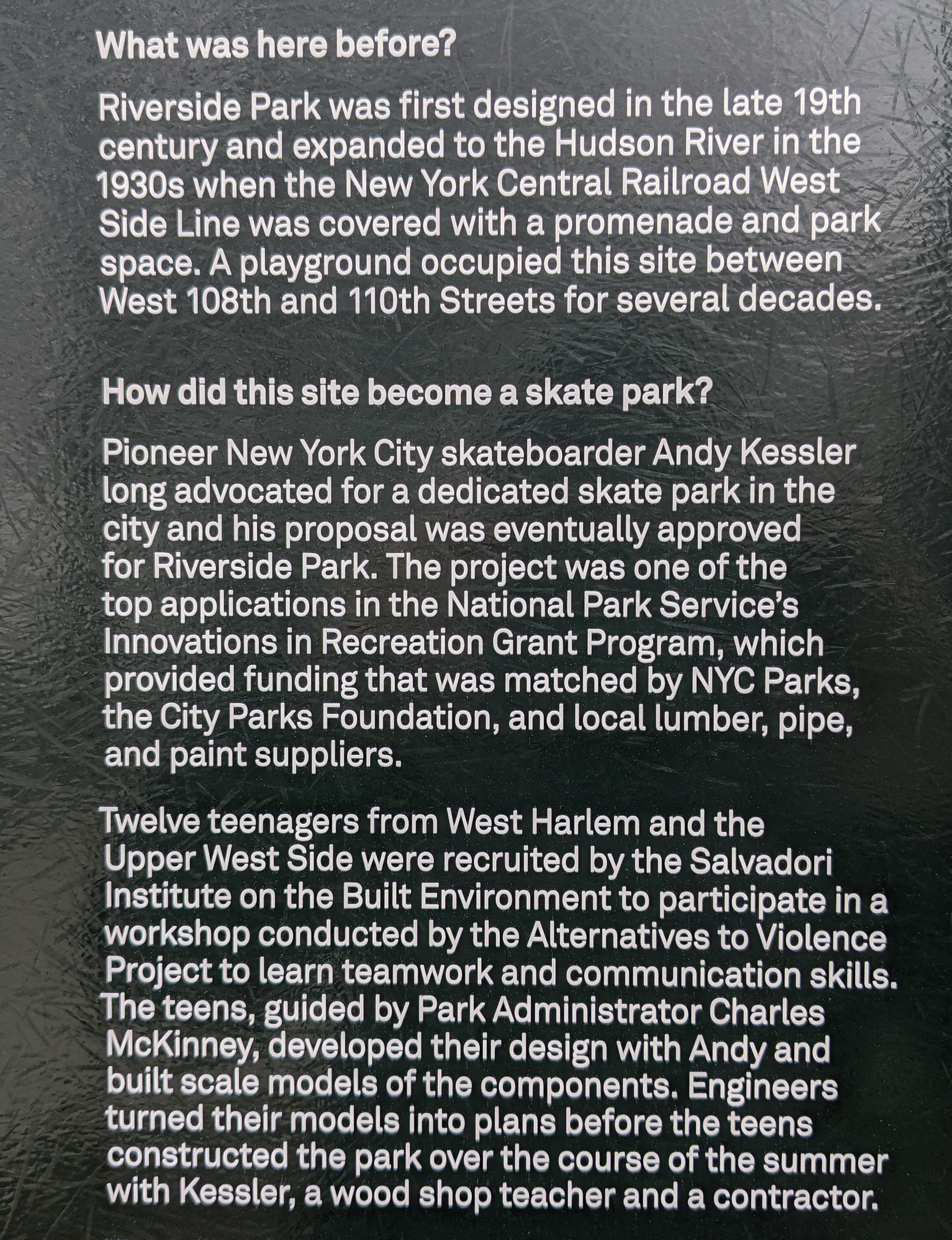
Andy Kessler Skatepark Plaque Skatepark History Part 1

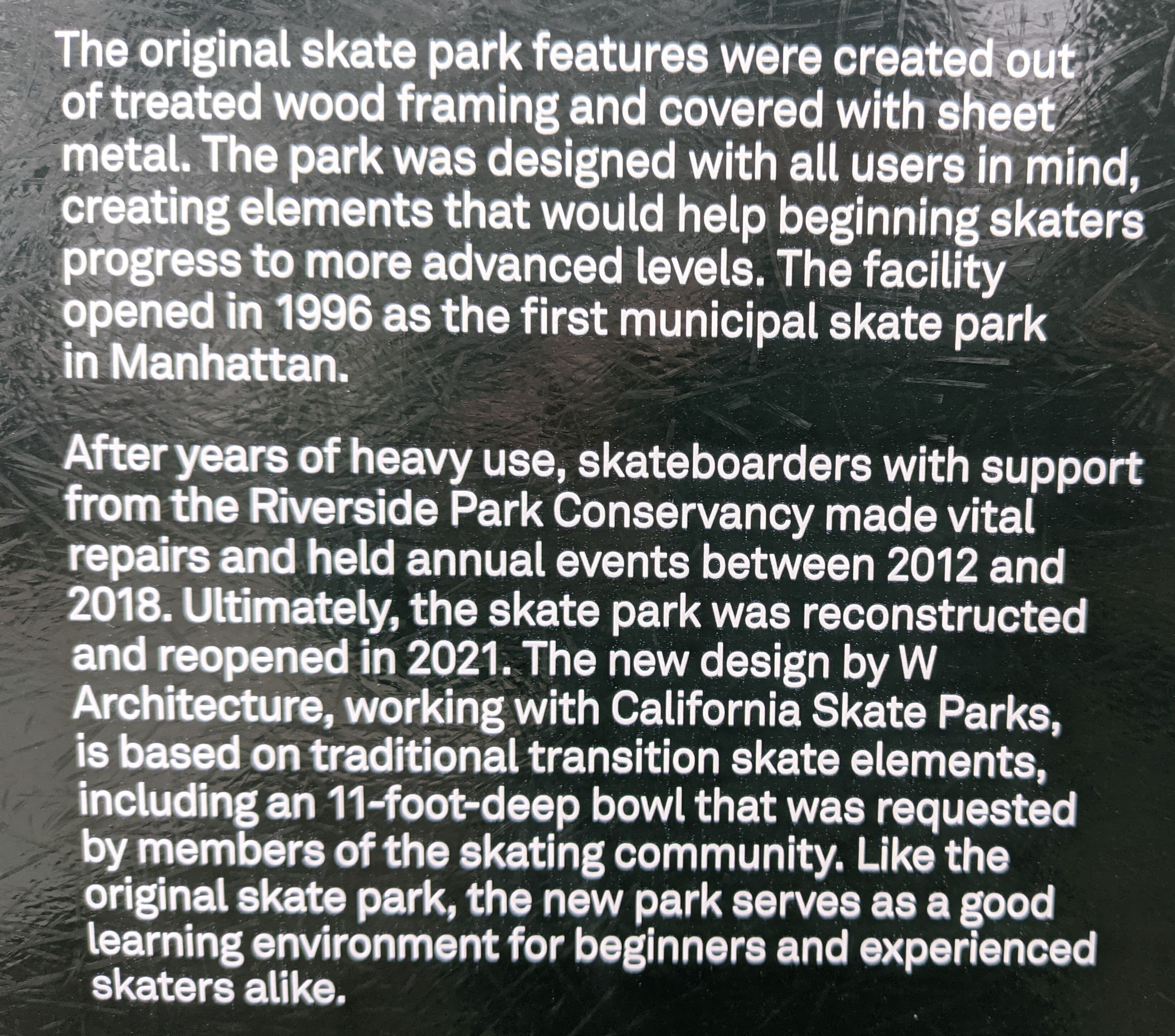
Andy Kessler Skatepark Plaque Skatepark History Part 2

== Terrain 1996-2019 ==
Riverside Skatepark, prior to the concrete remodel in 2019, was approximately 100 ft. by 300 ft. making it about 30,000 sq ft. Prior to the concrete remodeling, its main features were wooden ramps, the biggest being a vert ramp, 10 ft high by 28ft long, including a foot of vert. Other features included a 6 ft mini ramp, a micro mini ramp and a wall ride.

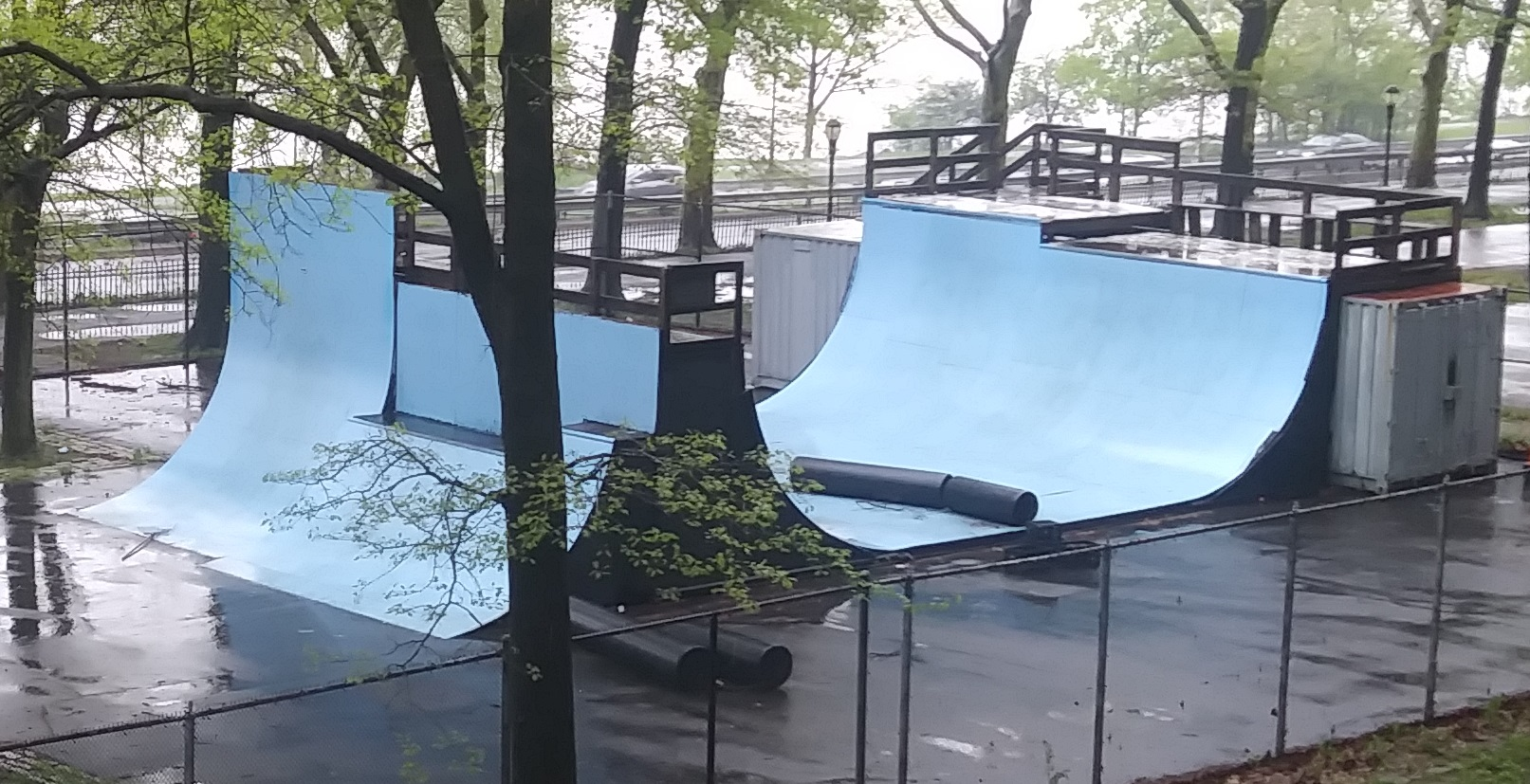
Vert Ramp looking North with Wall Ride on South West side

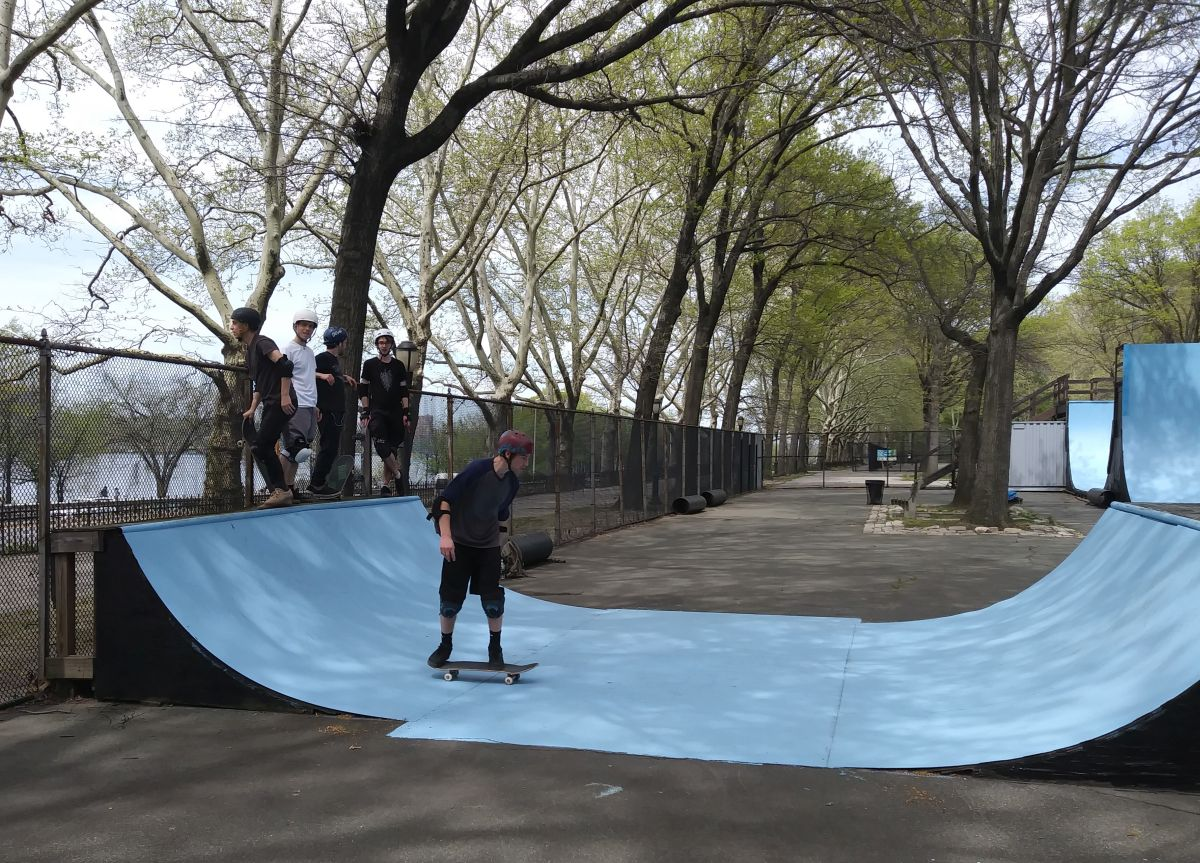
Micro Mini Ramp looking North

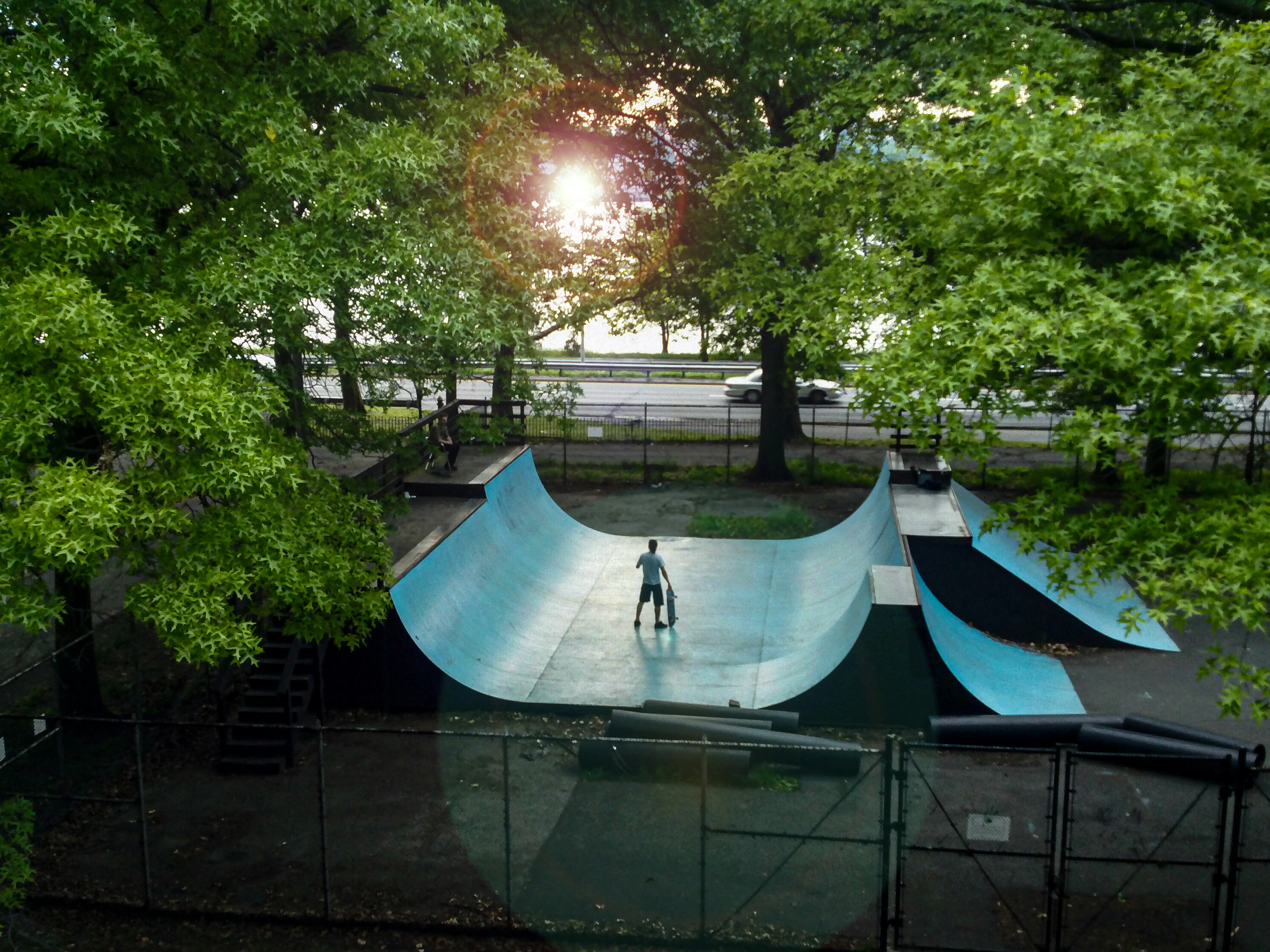
6Ft. Mini Ramp looking West

== Events ==
The annual Riverside Skate Jam is held at the end of the season, typically September or October, featuring judged competitions with 1st, 2nd and 3rd prizes awarded for Juniors Micro Mini Ramp, Girls Micro Mini Ramp, Wall Ride, Vert Ramp under 40's and Vert Ramp Masters (40 and over).
