= Bronx Skate Park =

Skatepark in the Bronx, New York

- Allerton Skate Park
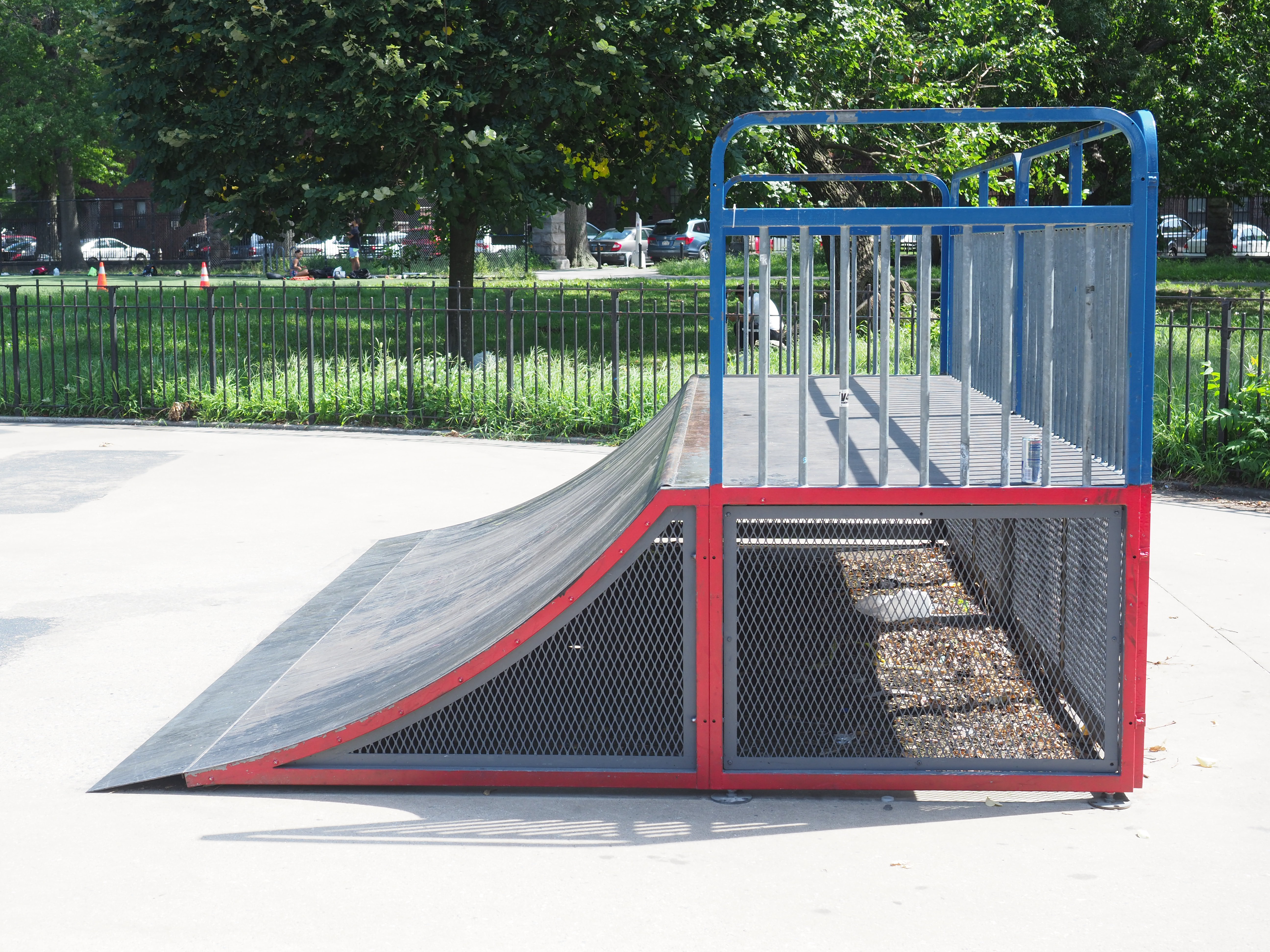
- Interactive map of Bronx Skate Park
- Type: Skate park
- Location: Bronx, New York
- Coordinates: 40.8670°N 73.8712°W
- Area: 6,000 ft^{2} (560 m^{2})
- Created: New York City Department of Parks and Recreation
- Established: 2008
- Designation: Bronx Skate Park

Bronx Skate Park (commonly known as Allerton Skate Park) is a 6,000 ft^{2} (560 m^{2}) skate park inside Bronx Park, a little north of Allerton Avenue, in The Bronx, New York City. The park includes a smooth skating surface, as well as being equipped with a quarter pipe, bank ramps with ledges, skate pyramid, and grind rails. As of August 2020, it is one of six skate parks in The Bronx run by NYC Parks.

== Park history ==
The skate park was opened in June 2008, as part of a $1.4 million renovation of Bronx Park which also included a new synthetic turf soccer field. Prior to its construction, the nearest skate park was in Throggs Neck. The skate park was originally proposed by the manager of a nearby McDonald's restaurant three years earlier; he saw that local kids were skateboarding in the restaurant's parking lot, and worried for their safety. The renovation project led to Bronx Park being named "Park of the Month" for September 2009.

=== Future remodel ===
In 2014, local resident Ron Cicatelli suggested replacing the city-run facility with an improved area using private funding. Cicatelli called the current park "outdated", and "stuck in the Stone Age". He proposed replacing it with a new design by Steve Rodriguez. Rodriguez, known as "Mayor of NYC Skate Parks", had previously designed skate parks on the Lower East Side and on River Avenue in the south Bronx. The proposal was approved by Community Board 11, but as of March 2014, was pending approval by the parks department. According to Cicatelli, the redesign would make the park a "destination", and would be of benefit to local business by bringing in additional traffic from the train.

=== Recognition ===
In 2018, Vlad Gomez, co-founder of the Public Housing Skate Team, cited Allerton Skate Park as one of the two major skate parks in The Bronx.
