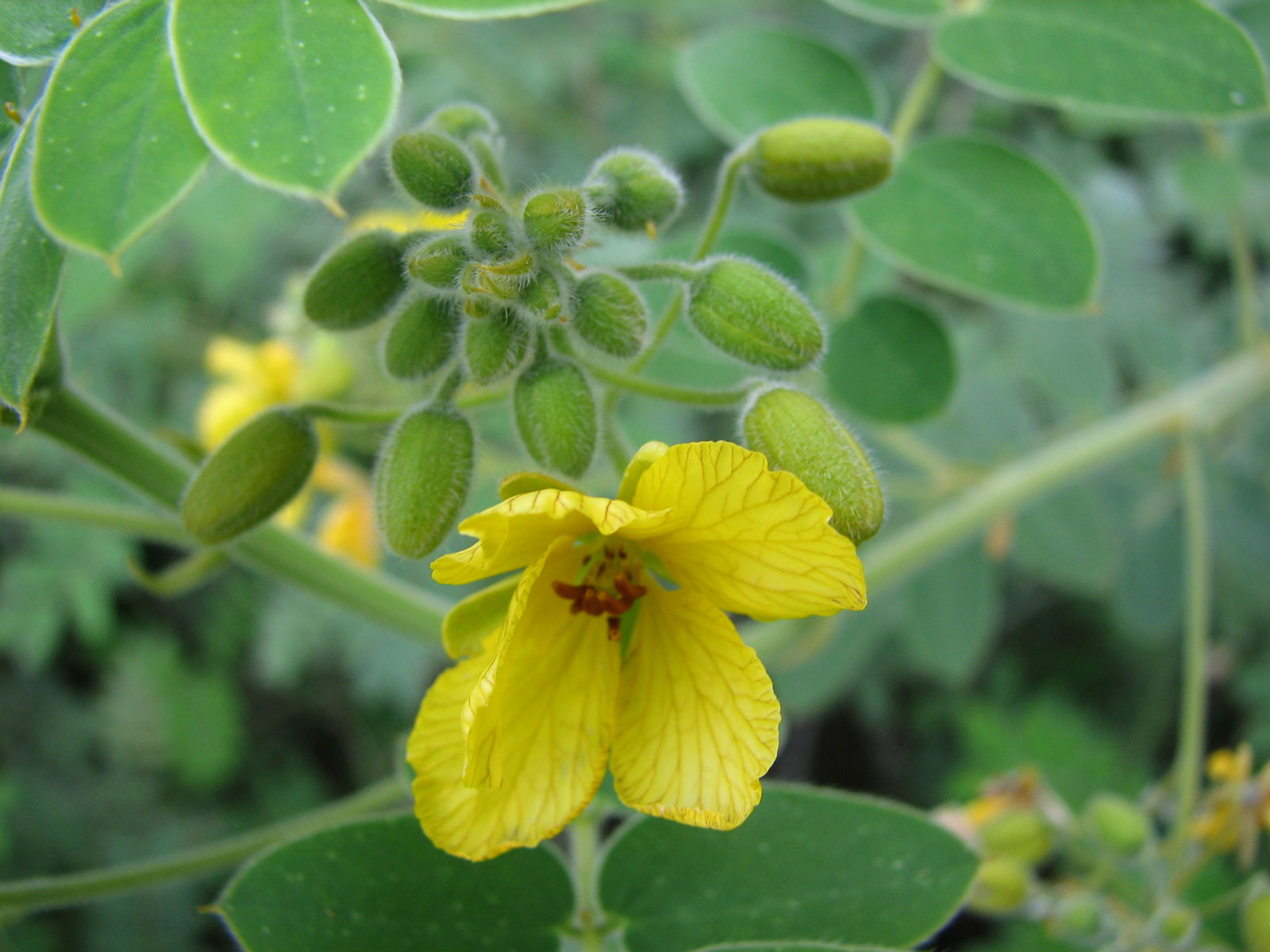
- Flower and flower buds
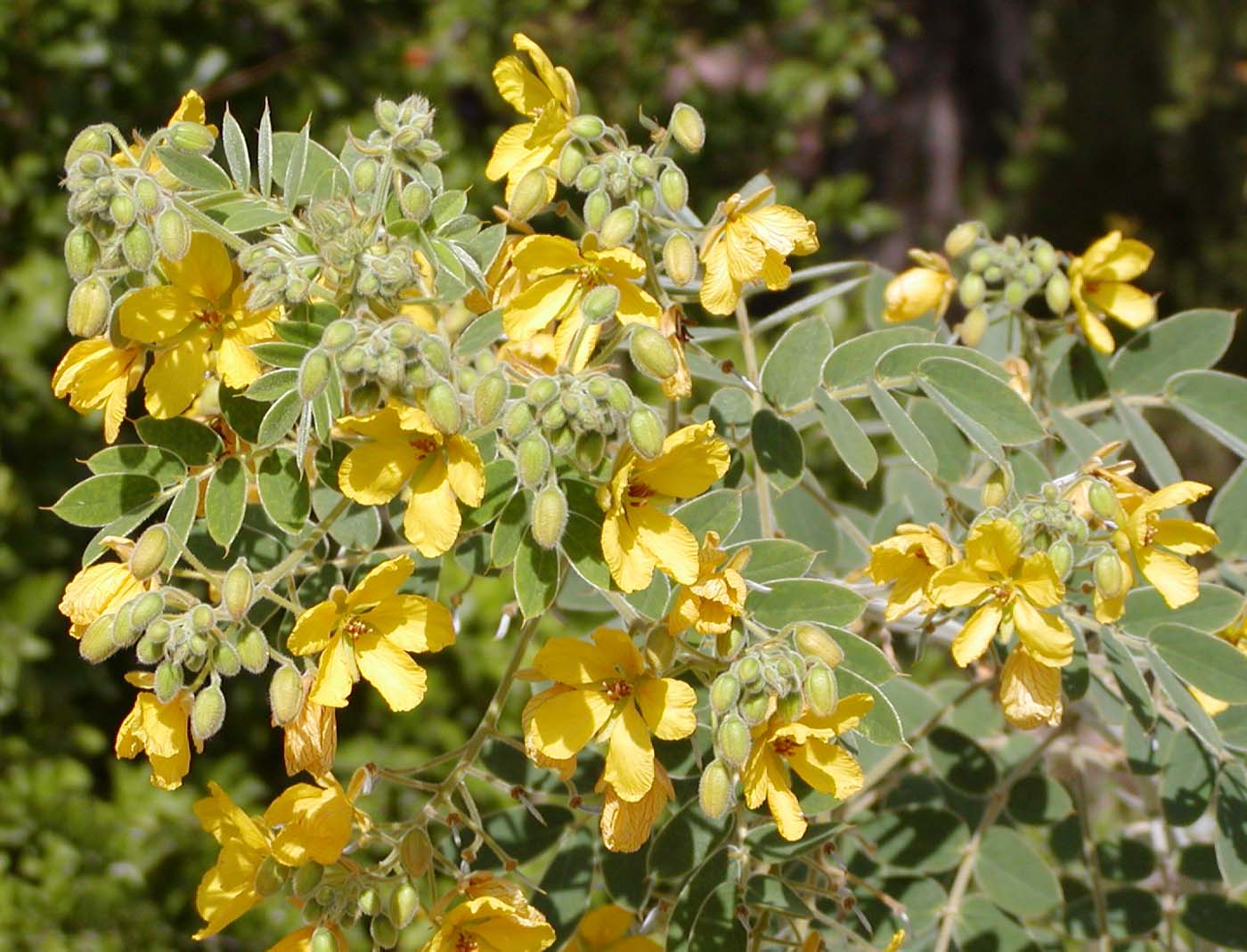
- Branch with flowers

Conservation status
- Apparently Secure (NatureServe)

Scientific classification
- Kingdom: Plantae
- Clade: Tracheophytes
- Clade: Angiosperms
- Clade: Eudicots
- Clade: Rosids
- Order: Fabales
- Family: Fabaceae
- Subfamily: Caesalpinioideae
- Genus: Senna
- Species: S. lindheimeriana

Binomial name
- Senna lindheimeriana (Scheele) H.S.Irwin & Barneby

Synonyms
- Cassia lindheimeriana Scheele; Earleocassia lindheimeriana (Scheele) Britton

= Senna lindheimeriana =

Species of plant

Senna lindheimeriana, the velvet leaf senna, is a species of flowering plant in the family Fabaceae. It is native to the US states of Arizona, New Mexico, and Texas, and to eastern Mexico. A perennial typically 1.5 m (5 ft) tall, it is hardy to USDA zone 8a, and is recommended for xeriscaping and for feeding birds, butterflies and bumblebees. It is thought to be lethally toxic to livestock, but is so foul-smelling and unpalatable that only starving mammals will consume it.

Senna lindheimeriana was named after German botanist Ferdinand Lindheimer.
