= New York Botanical Garden =

Botanical garden in the Bronx, New York

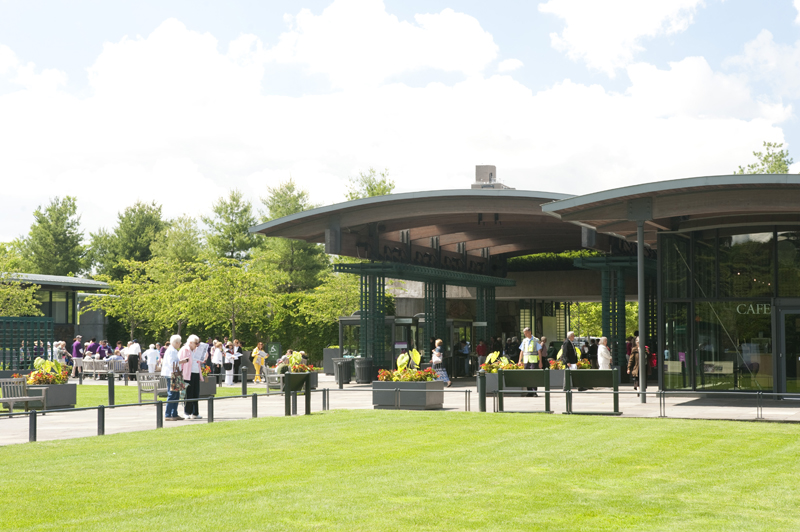
- Visitor Center in June 2012
- Established: 1891
- Location: The Bronx, New York City
- Public transit access: Metro-North Railroad: Harlem Line Botanical Garden; New York City Subway: Pelham Parkway or Allerton Avenue; New York City Bus: Bx9, Bx12, Bx12 SBS, Bx19, Bx22, Bx25, Bx26, Bx30, Bx39, Bx41, Bx41 SBS; Bee-Line Bus: 60, 61, 62
- Website: www.nybg.org
- New York Botanical Garden
- U.S. National Register of Historic Places
- U.S. National Historic Landmark District
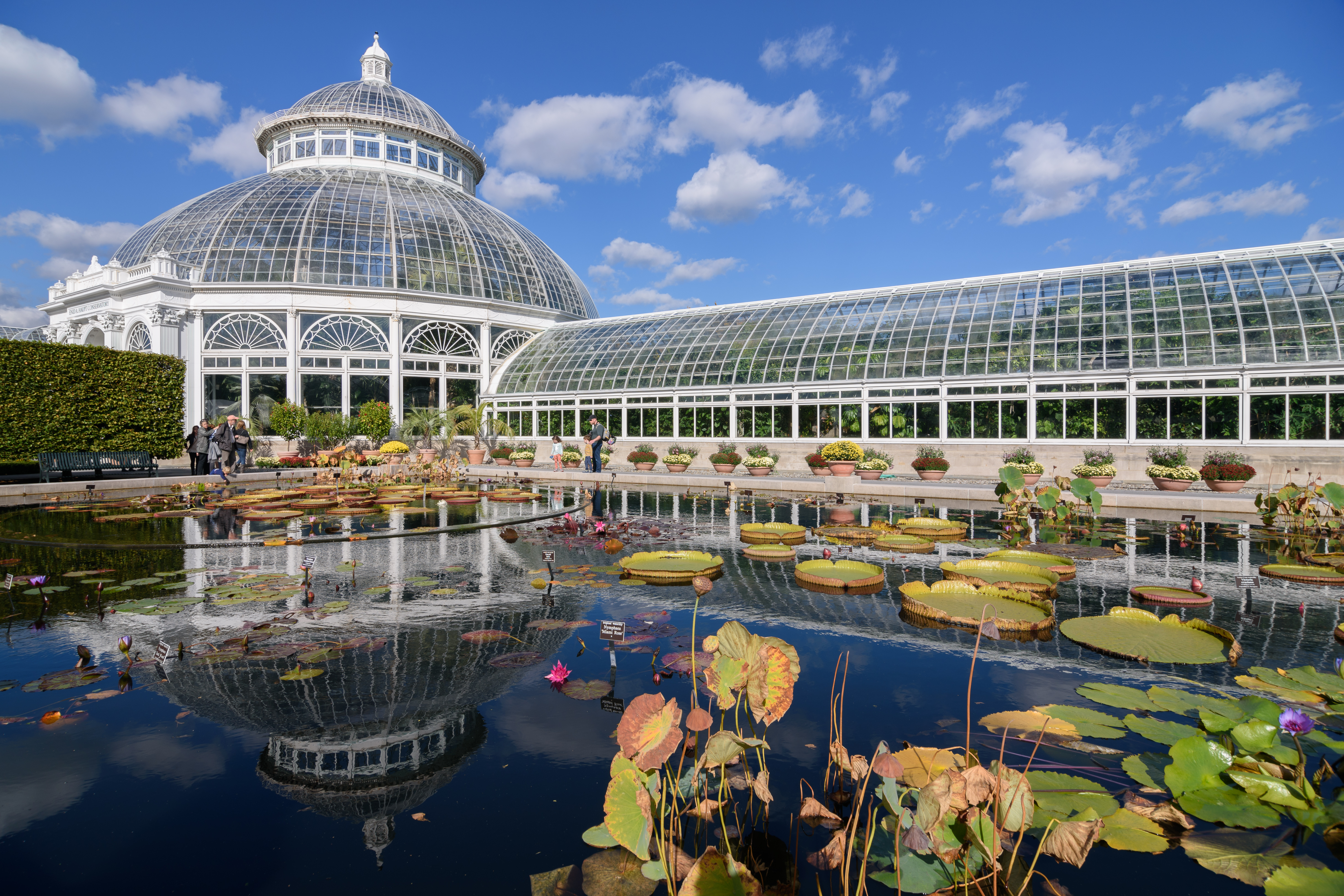
- Enid A. Haupt Conservatory
- Location: Southern and Bedford Park Boulevards; Bronx, New York 10458
- Coordinates: 40°51′49″N 73°52′42″W
- Area: 250 acres (100 ha)
- Built: 1891
- Architects: Lord & Burnham Co.
- Architectural style: Victorian era
- NRHP reference No.: 67000009

Significant dates
- Added to NRHP: May 28, 1967
- Designated NHLD: May 28, 1967

The New York Botanical Garden (NYBG) is a botanical garden at Bronx Park in the Bronx, New York City. Established in 1891, it is located on a 250-acre (100 ha) site that contains a landscape with over one million living plants; the Enid A. Haupt Conservatory, a greenhouse containing several habitats; and the LuEsther T. Mertz Library, which contains one of the world's largest collections of botany-related texts. As of 2016, over a million people visit the New York Botanical Garden annually.

NYBG is also a major educational institution, teaching visitors about plant science, ecology, and healthful eating through NYBG's interactive programming. Nearly 90,000 of the annual visitors are children from underserved neighboring communities. An additional 3,000 are teachers from New York City's public school system participating in professional development programs that train them to teach science courses at all grade levels. NYBG operates one of the world's largest plant research and conservation programs.

NYBG was established in 1891 and the first structures on the grounds opened at the end of that decade. Since 1967, the garden has been listed as a National Historic Landmark District, and several buildings have been designated as official New York City landmarks.

== Mission statement ==
The New York Botanical Garden is an advocate for the plant world. The Garden pursues its mission through its role as a museum of living plant collections arranged in gardens and landscapes across its National Historic Landmark site; through its comprehensive education programs in horticulture and plant science; and through the wide-ranging research programs of the International Plant Science Center.

== History ==
=== Context ===
As early as 1877, ideas had been circulating in New York City to create a botanical garden; funding could not be obtained at the time, although the efforts led to parkland being set aside for future use. By 1888, the Torrey Botanical Society was promoting the construction of a large botanical garden in New York City. The Garden's creation followed a fund-raising campaign led by the Torrey Botanical Society and Columbia University botanist Nathaniel Lord Britton and his wife Elizabeth Gertrude Britton, who were inspired to emulate the Royal Botanic Gardens in London.

In 1889, the Torrey Botanical Society's members decided to build the botanical garden at Bronx Park in the center of the Bronx, New York City's northernmost borough. The Lorillard family owned most of the land at that location. The city had already been given authorization to acquire the land as part of the 1884 New Parks Act, which was intended to preserve lands that would soon become part of New York City. Some 640 acres (2.6 km^{2}) of land surrounding the Lorillard estate was acquired by the City of New York as part of Bronx Park in 1888–1889.

=== Establishment ===
By act of the New York State Legislature, the New York Botanical Garden was established on April 28, 1891. The garden occupied part of the grounds of the Lorillard estate and a parcel that was formerly the easternmost portion of the campus of St. John's College (now Fordham University); the latter included three graves of the Fordham University Cemetery, which were then relocated. The stated purpose of the act was:

... for the purpose of establishing and maintaining a botanical garden and museum and arboretum therein, for the collection of and culture of plants, flowers, shrubs and trees, the advancement of botanical science and knowledge, and the prosecution of original researches therein and in kindred subjects, for affording instruction in the same, for the prosecution and exhibition of ornamental and decorative horticulture and gardening, and for the entertainment, recreation and instruction of the people.

As per the acts of incorporation, a board of directors would manage the NYBG. The board of directors included Columbia College's president and professors of biology, chemistry, and geology; the presidents of the Torrey Society, New York City Board of Education, and the Department of Public Parks' board of commissioners; the Mayor of New York City; and nine other members elected to the board. The legislation would provide 250 acres (100 ha) within Bronx Park to the NYBG, and enable the board of directors to construct a library and conservatory, if at least $250,000 was raised within five years. If this condition were reached, the city would then issue $0.5 million in bonds. The principal officers of the new corporation set up for the garden were Cornelius Vanderbilt II, Andrew Carnegie and J.P. Morgan, with Nathaniel Lord Britton as the new secretary.

Prominent civic leaders and financiers, including Vanderbilt, Carnegie, and Morgan, agreed to match the City's commitment to finance the buildings and improvements. By May 1895, the $250,000 in bonds had been raised but the plans had not been fully confirmed. The Board of Directors then asked landscape architect Calvert Vaux and his partner, Parks Superintendent Samuel Parsons Jr., to consult on site selection. The north end of Bronx Park was decided as the best location for the NYBG. By August 1895, the architects had started a survey on the site. Because the Bronx River and various small tributaries ran through the park, drainage was a major consideration. Though Vaux's preliminary layout was approved in October 1895, he died the following month. The topographical survey was completed in March 1896. The master plan was created by a team that included Britton & Parsons, as well as landscape engineer John R. Brinley, landscape gardener Samuel Henshaw, botanist Lucien Marcus Underwood, and architects Robert W. Gibson and Lincoln Pierson (the latter from the firm Lord & Burnham).

The LuEsther T. Mertz Library and Enid A. Haupt Conservatory were among the first structures at the NYBG to open. The Library was built between 1897 and 1900, and the Conservatory was built around the same time, being completed in 1902.

=== 1900s to 1980s ===
For over a century after its opening, the NYBG refused to charge admission. Because of this, as well as insufficient government and private funding, its budget deficit started to increase in the 1950s. After the city cut the NYBG's budget in 1970, the garden was forced to remain closed for 3 to 4 days a week, and officials worried that this could eventually lead to permanent closure. In 1974, for the first time in the botanical garden's history, officials had to annually petition New York State Legislature for funds. That year, the NYBG announced a major renovation to the conservatory and the addition of a building dedicated to displaying plants in different habitats. The next year, budget cuts related to the 1975 New York City fiscal crisis resulted in the NYBG being closed on weekdays for the first time in its history.

In 1988, the NYBG announced a renovation of its museum building, including the addition of a new annex, which was supposed to open in 1991. By the early 1990s, the NYBG facilities were neglected. The garden did not have enough space in its parking lots to accommodate all its visitors, turning away potential guests. Many areas were neglected, except for the 40 acres (16 ha) surrounding the conservatory, and a wetland had even been created unintentionally due to a broken sewer. A controversy arose in 1994 when the adjacent Fordham University proposed building a 480-foot-tall (150 m) radio tower for its radio station WFUV directly across from the Haupt Conservatory. The dispute continued until 2002, after several years of failed resolutions, when Montefiore Medical Center offered to move WFUV's antenna to its own facilities.

=== 1990s to present ===
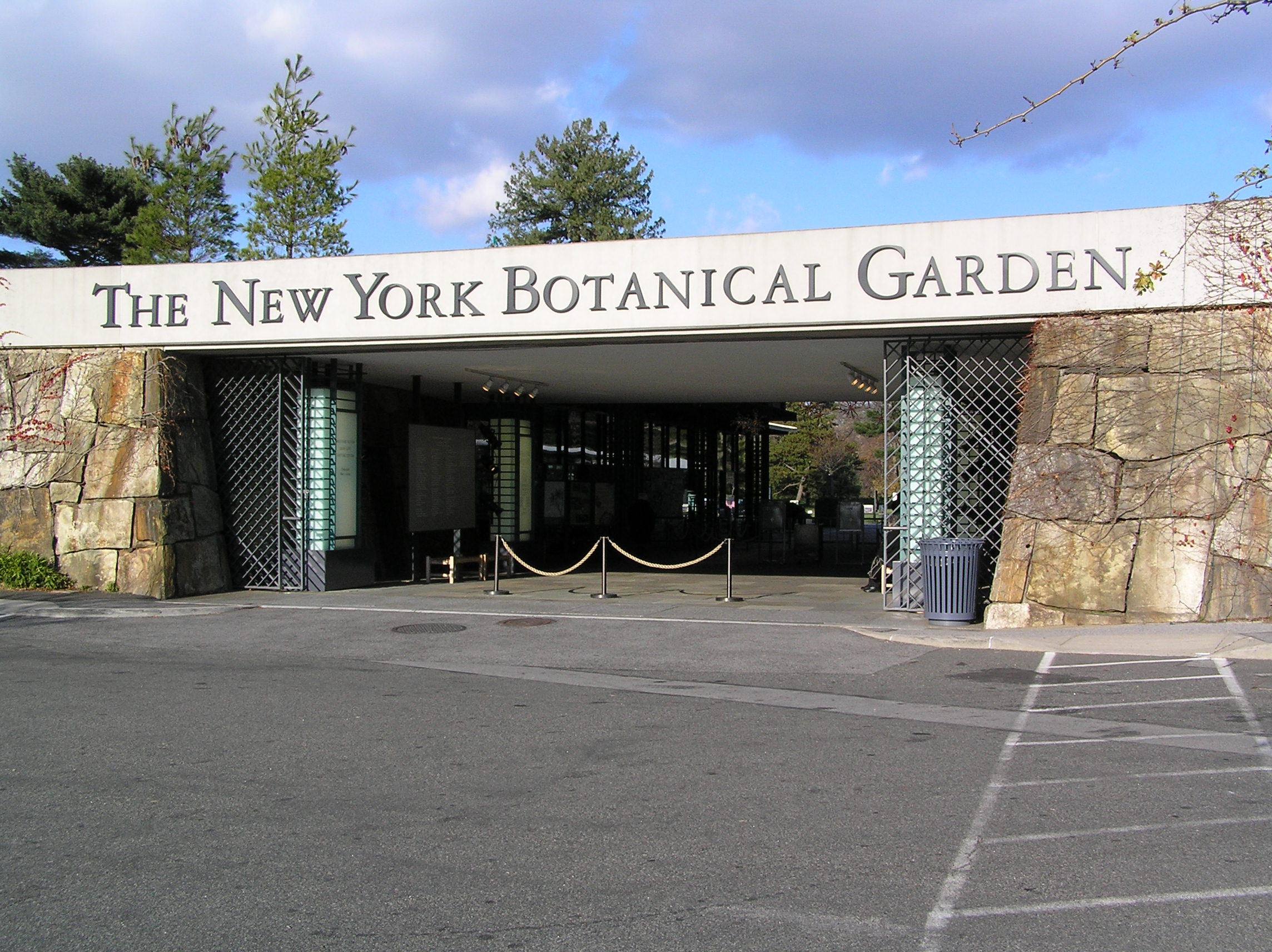
Entrance to NYBG

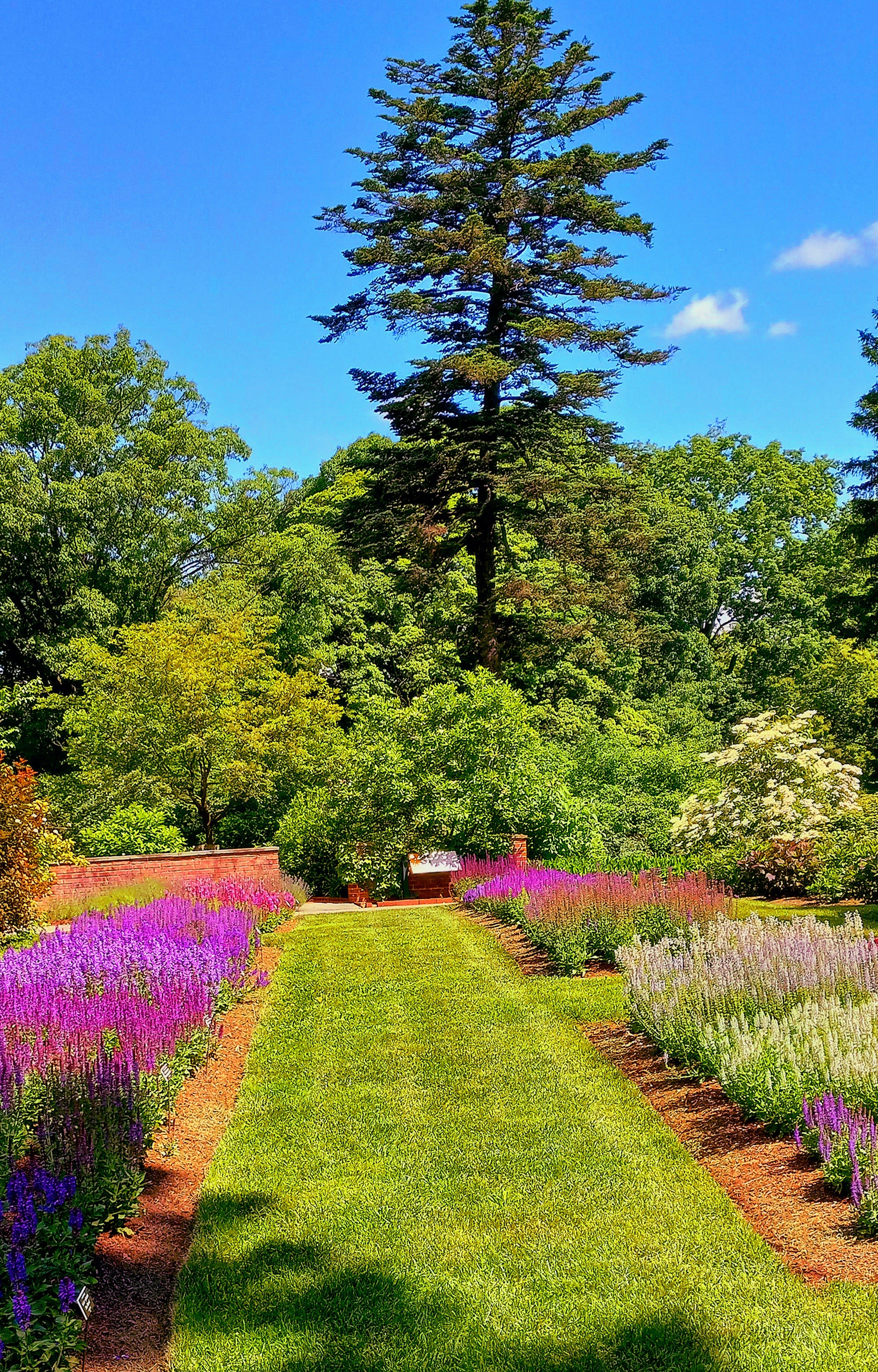
Section of Rosen Seasonal Walk at the New York Botanical Garden

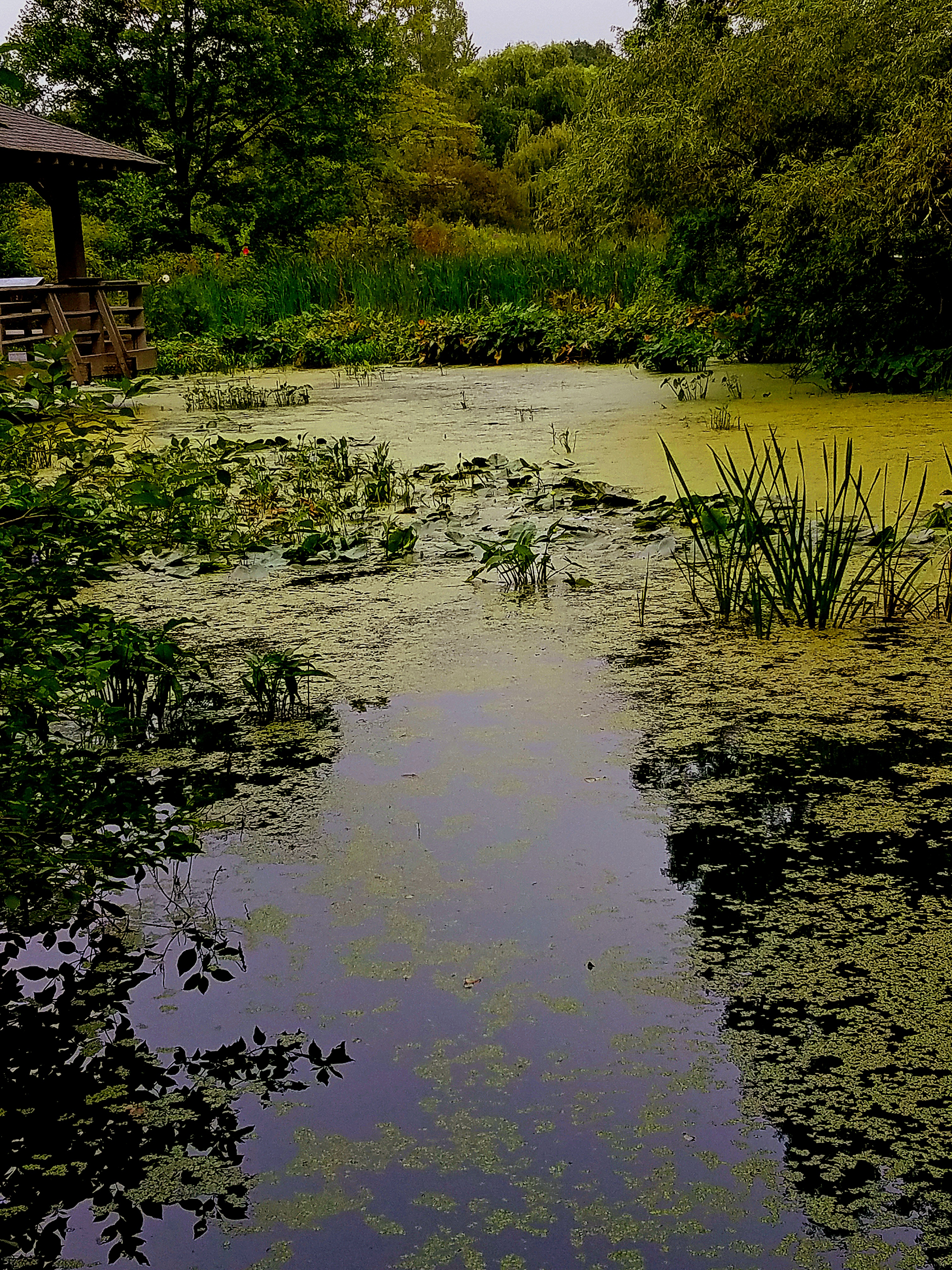
Pond area of the Mitsubishi Wild Wetland Trail at the New York Botanical Garden

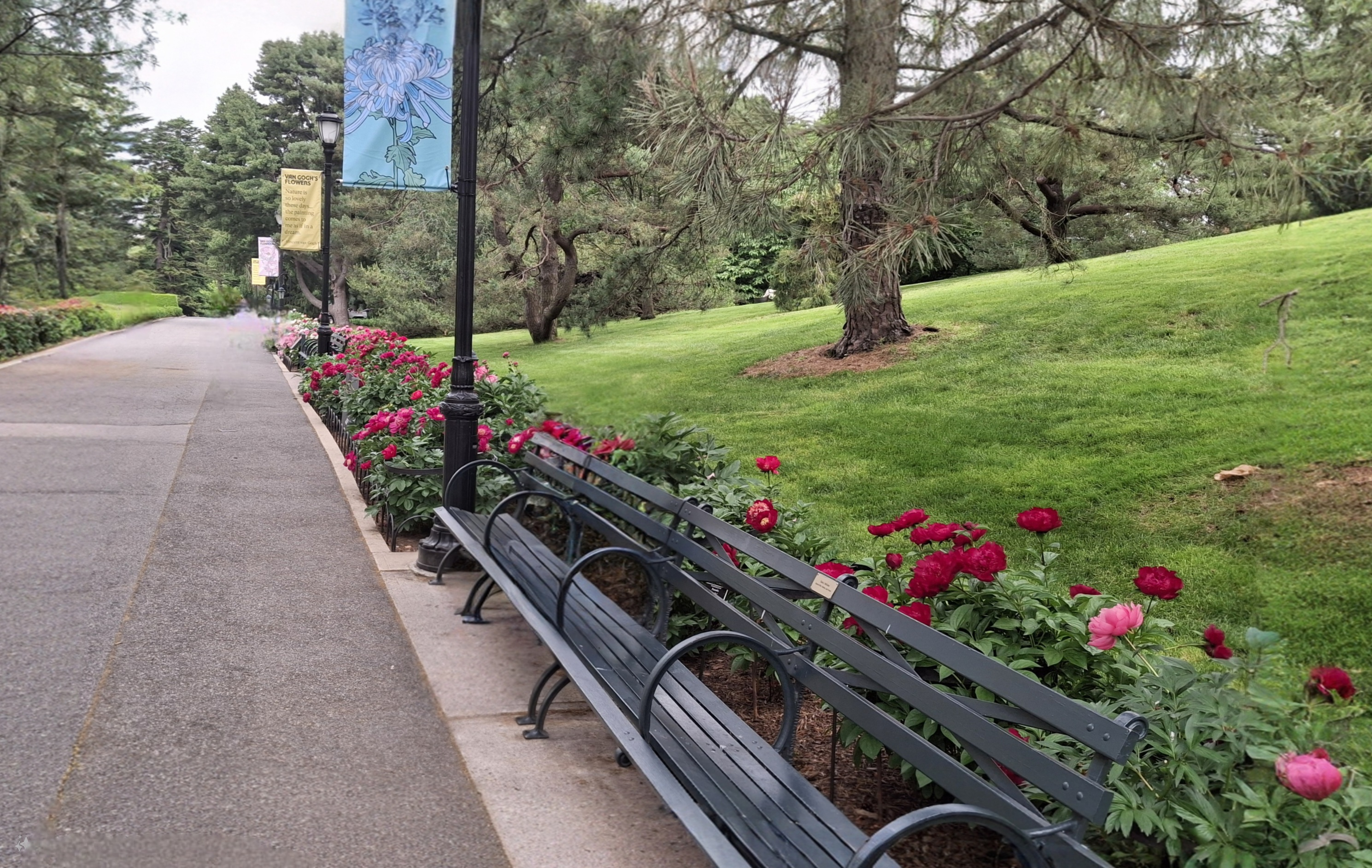
Matelich Peony Collection at the New York Botanical Garden

By the mid-1990s, additions to the NYBG were being undertaken to reverse years of neglect. In 1994 the formerly free garden started charging an admission fee to fund these improvements as well as the continued maintenance of existing facilities. The Everett Children's Garden opened in mid-1998. By 2000, the NYBG had requested $300 million for renovations, including a new gift shop and renovation of the greenhouses and roads. A new visitor center and gift shop were announced the following year, which would replace temporary facilities built in 1990. The new main entrance, with a gift shop, bookstore, plaza, restrooms, cafe, and information kiosks, was completed in 2004 at a cost of $21 million. Meanwhile, the addition of the library annex was delayed to 1994, then to 2000. Construction on the annex started in 1998 and it opened in 2002 as the International Plant Science Center.

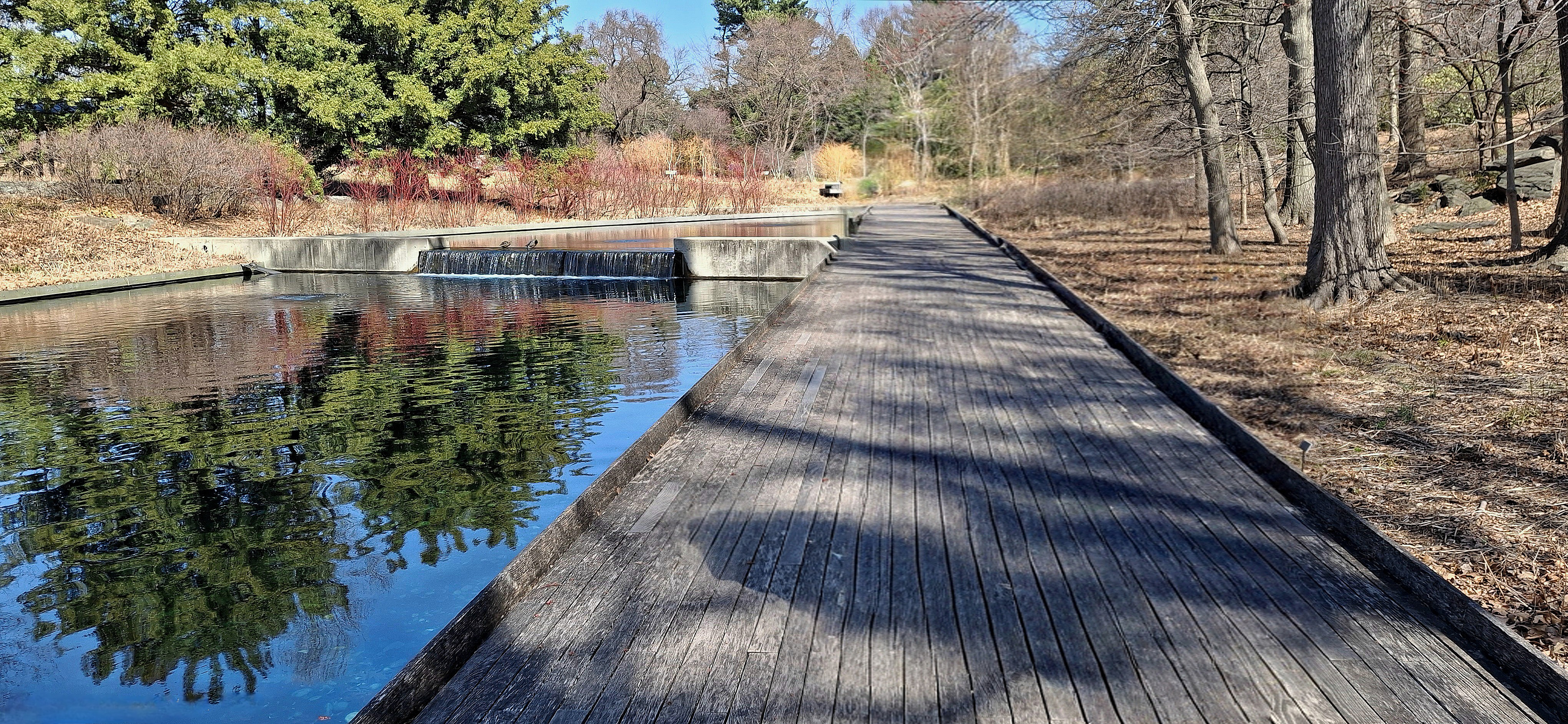
Native Plant Garden at the New York Botanical Garden

In 2000, the NYBG began raising money for a $300 million renovation campaign after the city government donated $22 million. The NYBG's International Plant Science Center reopened in 2002 following a renovation. Several other projects were completed and programs implemented in the 2000s. In 2004, the Leon Levy Visitor Center opened as the Botanical Garden's main entrance. It included the NYBG Shop and the Pine Tree Café. The following year, the Nolen Greenhouses for Living Collections opened with its publicly accessible Bourke-Sullivan Display House. The Plant Research Laboratory was completed in early 2005 and opened the next year at a cost of $23 million. In addition to restoring or redesigning existing gardens and collections, such as the Ladies' Border (2002), the Benenson Ornamental Conifers (2004), the Peggy Rockefeller Rose Garden (2007), the Thain Family Forest (2011), the Wetland Trail (2010), the Marjorie G. Rosen Seasonal Walk by Piet Oudolf (2014), and the Matelich Peony Collection (2016), the New York Botanical Garden added new gardens and collections to its grounds: the Home Gardening Center (2005), the Maureen K. Chilton Azalea Garden (2011) by landscape architect Shavaun Towers of Towers|Golde LLC, and Native Plant Garden (2013), by landscape architect Sheila Brady of Oehme, van Sweden.

Off-site, the institution opened The New York Botanical Garden Midtown Education Center in Manhattan in 2010. NYBG added a parking garage, the Peter J. Sharp Building, nearby in 2012, along with a Bedford Gate entrance to the Garden. NYBG restored its Lorillard Snuff Mill in 2010 and it was named the Lillian and Amy Goldman Stone Mill. NYBG's Humanities Research Institute, supported by The Andrew W. Mellon Foundation, was created in 2014 to stimulate public discourse about humankind's relationship with nature and the environment. NYBG opened an on-site restaurant, the Hudson Garden Grill, in 2015. It redesigned and reopened its East Gate entrance in 2017. The Edible Academy, an educational facility for teaching children, families, educators, and the general public about vegetable gardening, nutrition awareness, and environmental stewardship, opened in 2018. In February 2020, NYBG announced that it was partnering with Douglaston Development to create affordable apartments on the northwest edge of the garden. In January 2024, the NYBG revealed a major rebranding, developed in partnership with global brand consultancy Wolff Olins. The rebrand included a new logo featuring a bespoke typeface "NY Botanical Gothic", as well as a new color palette. An American Sycamore next to the Everett Garden Gate was added to the New York City Department of Parks and Recreation's list of Great Trees of New York City. A new pedestrian entrance from Bronx Park East opened in 2026.

== Grounds ==
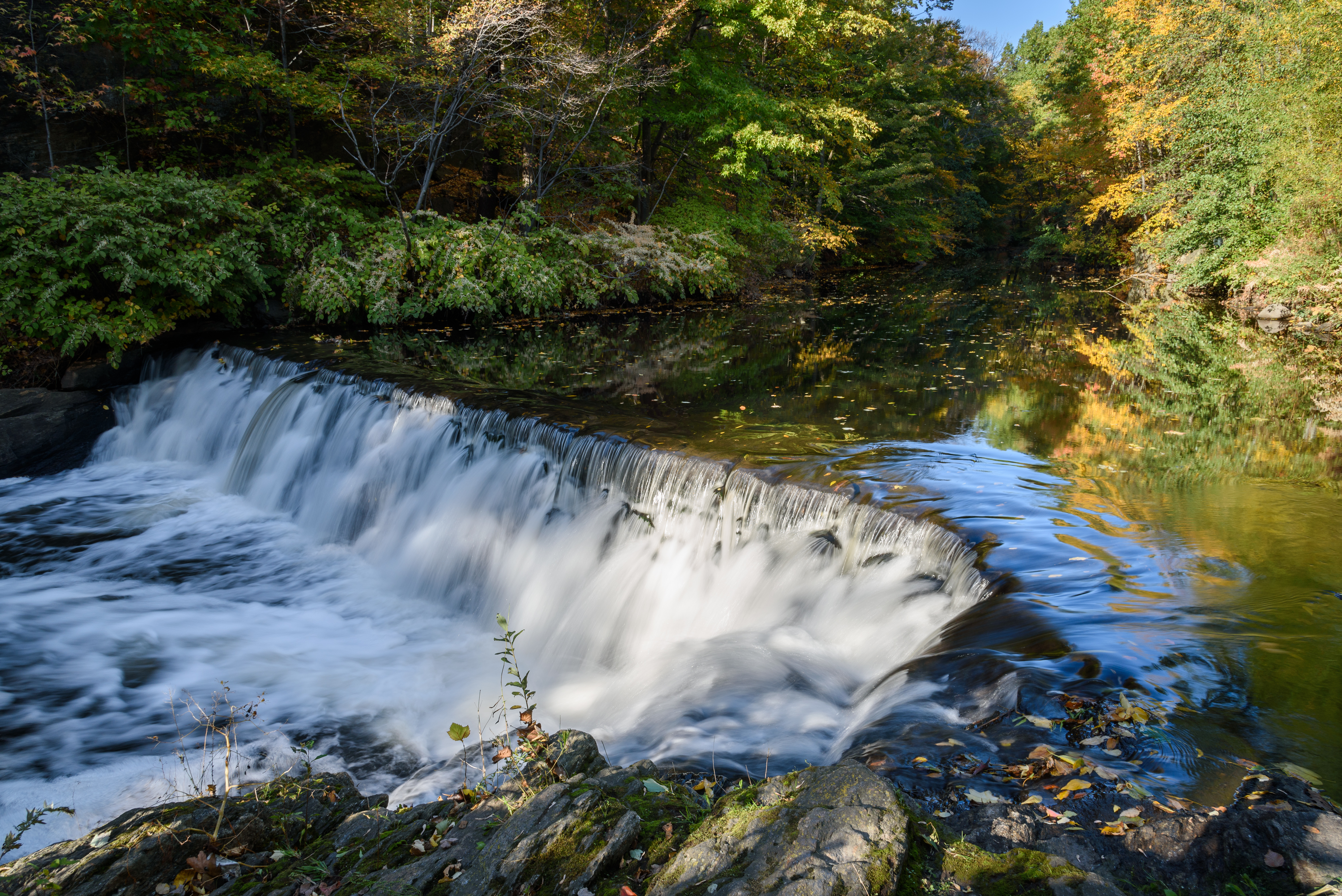
Bronx River Waterfall in NYBG

The Garden contains 50 different gardens and plant collections. There is a serene cascade waterfall, as well as wetlands and a 50-acre (20 ha) tract of original, never-logged, old-growth New York forest.

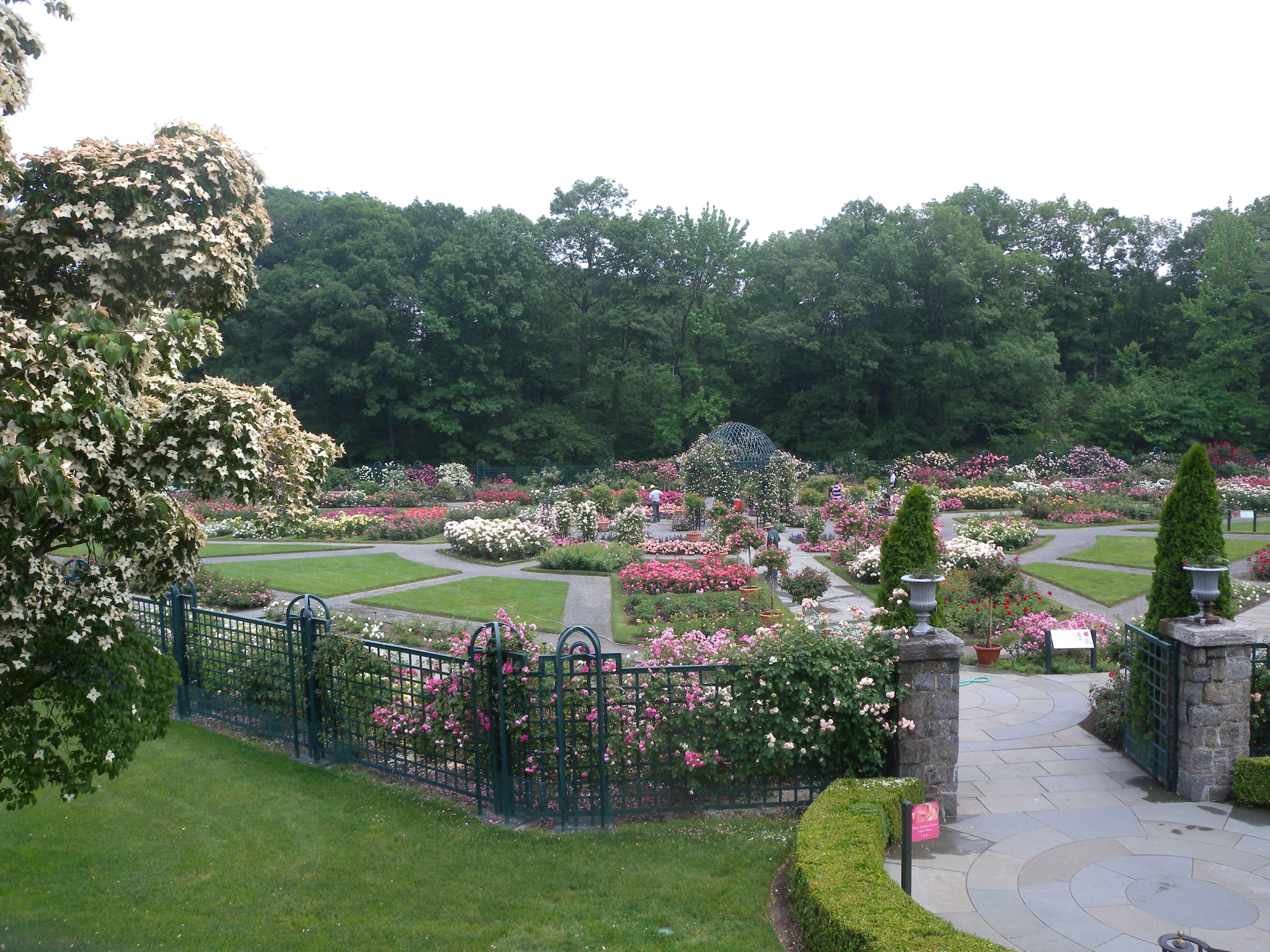
The Peggy Rockefeller Rose Garden

Garden highlights include the 1890s-vintage Haupt Conservatory, designed by Lord & Burnham; the Peggy Rockefeller Rose Garden, originally laid out by Beatrix Jones Farrand in 1916; an alpine rock garden, designed and installed by Thomas H. Everett in the 1930s; an Herb Garden, designed by Penelope Hobhouse; and a 37-acre (15 ha) conifer collection. The NYBG's extensive research facilities include a propagation center, 550,000-volume research library, and an herbarium of 7.2 to 7.8 million botanical specimens dating back more than three centuries, among the largest in the world.

=== Specialty gardens and collections ===
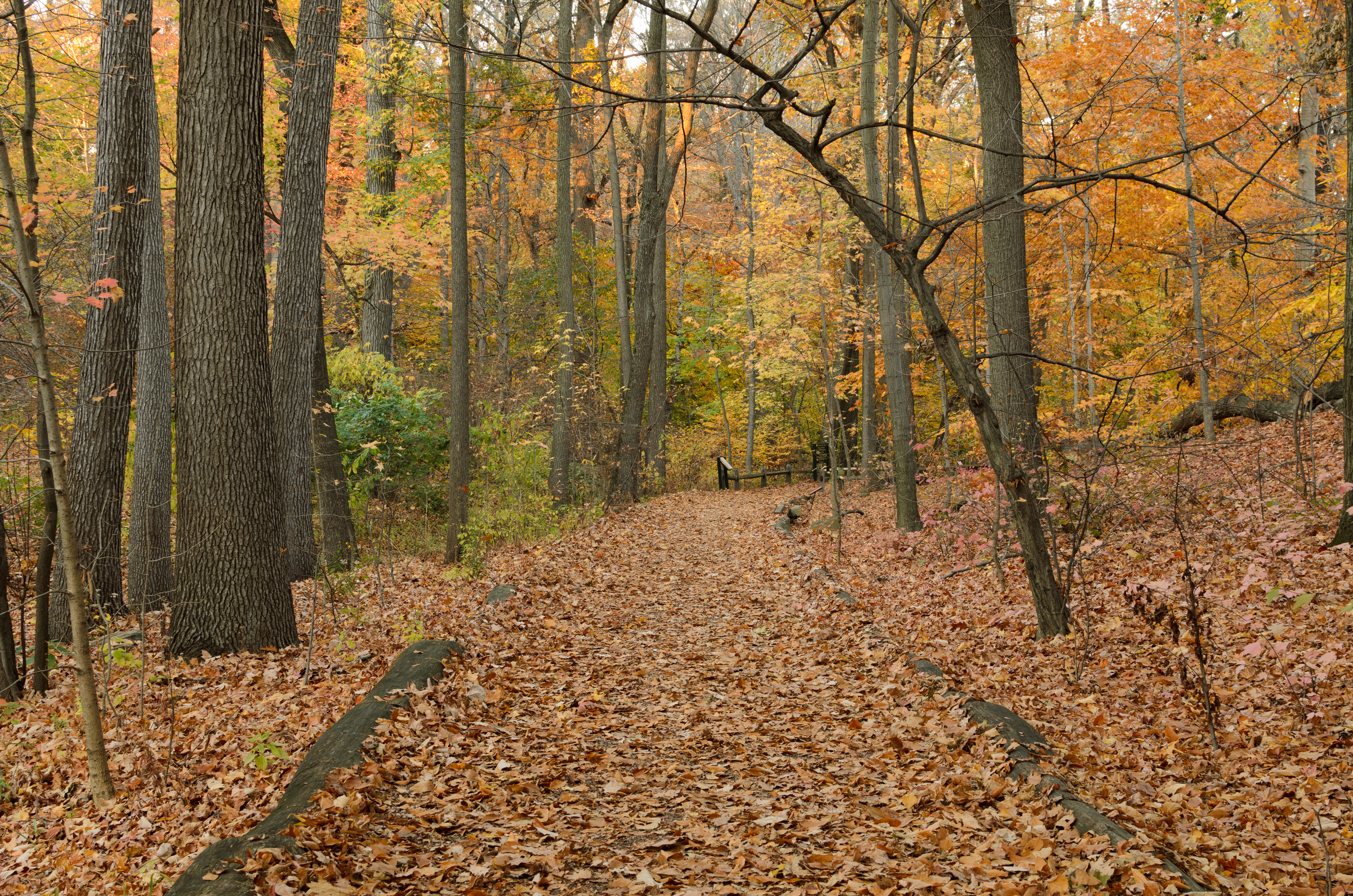
Thain Family Forest in NYBG

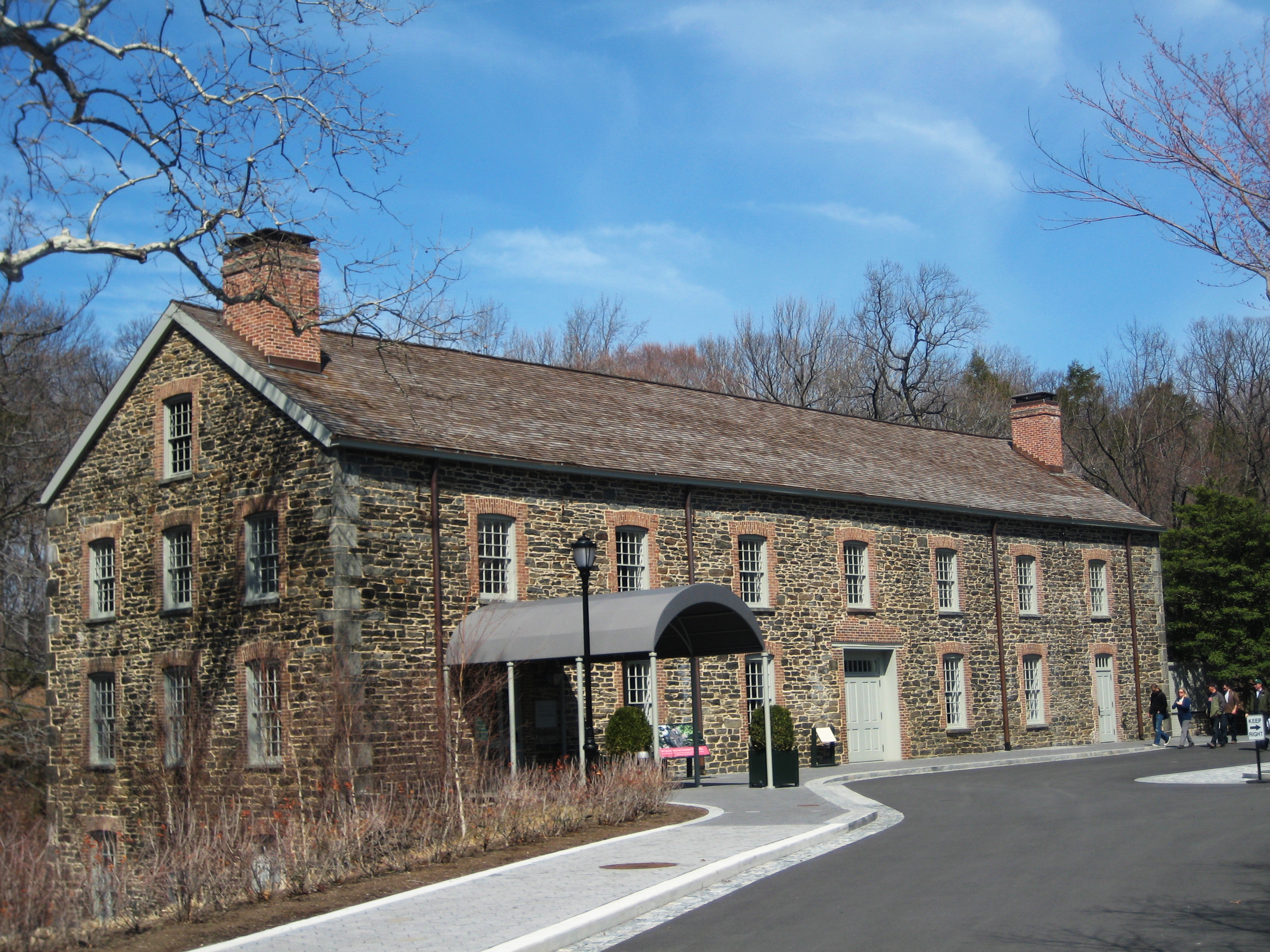
The Stone Mill, within NYBG

At the heart of the Garden is the Thain Family Forest, an old-growth forest. It is the largest existing remnant of the original forest which covered all of New York City before the arrival of European settlers in the 17th century. The forest, which was never logged, contains oaks, American beeches, cherry, birch, tulip and white ash trees, some more than two centuries old.

The forest itself is split by the Bronx River, the only freshwater river in New York City, and this stretch of the river includes a riverine canyon and rapids. Along the shores sits the Stone Mill, previously known as the Lorillard Snuff Mill, built in 1840. Sculptor Charles Tefft created the Fountain of Life on the grounds in 1905.

The Ladies' Border, originally commissioned by the Women's Auxiliary Committee in the 1920s, was designed by Ellen Shipman and installed between 1931 and 1933. It consists of a sheltered area measuring 30 by 300 feet (9.1 by 91.4 m) across, near the Haupt Conservatory. In 2000, designer Lynden B. Miller created a new plan for the Ladies' Border. The Jane Watson Irwin Perennial Garden was designed in the 1970s by Dan Kiley and redefined by Miller in the 1980s and again in 2003.

=== Structures ===
==== Research laboratories ====
The Pfizer Plant Research Laboratory, named for Pfizer, is a two-story. 28,000-square-foot (2,600 m^{2}) research building that opened in 2006. The laboratory studies plant genomics, molecular systematics, plant use in New York City's immigrant communities, and the processes through which plants create neurotoxins. The building has nine labs, one of which is a lab with robotic workstations on the second floor. Genomic DNA from many different species is extracted to create a library of the DNA of the world's plants. This collection is stored in a DNA storage room with 20 freezers housing millions of specimens, including rare, endangered or extinct species.

==== LuEsther T. Mertz Library ====
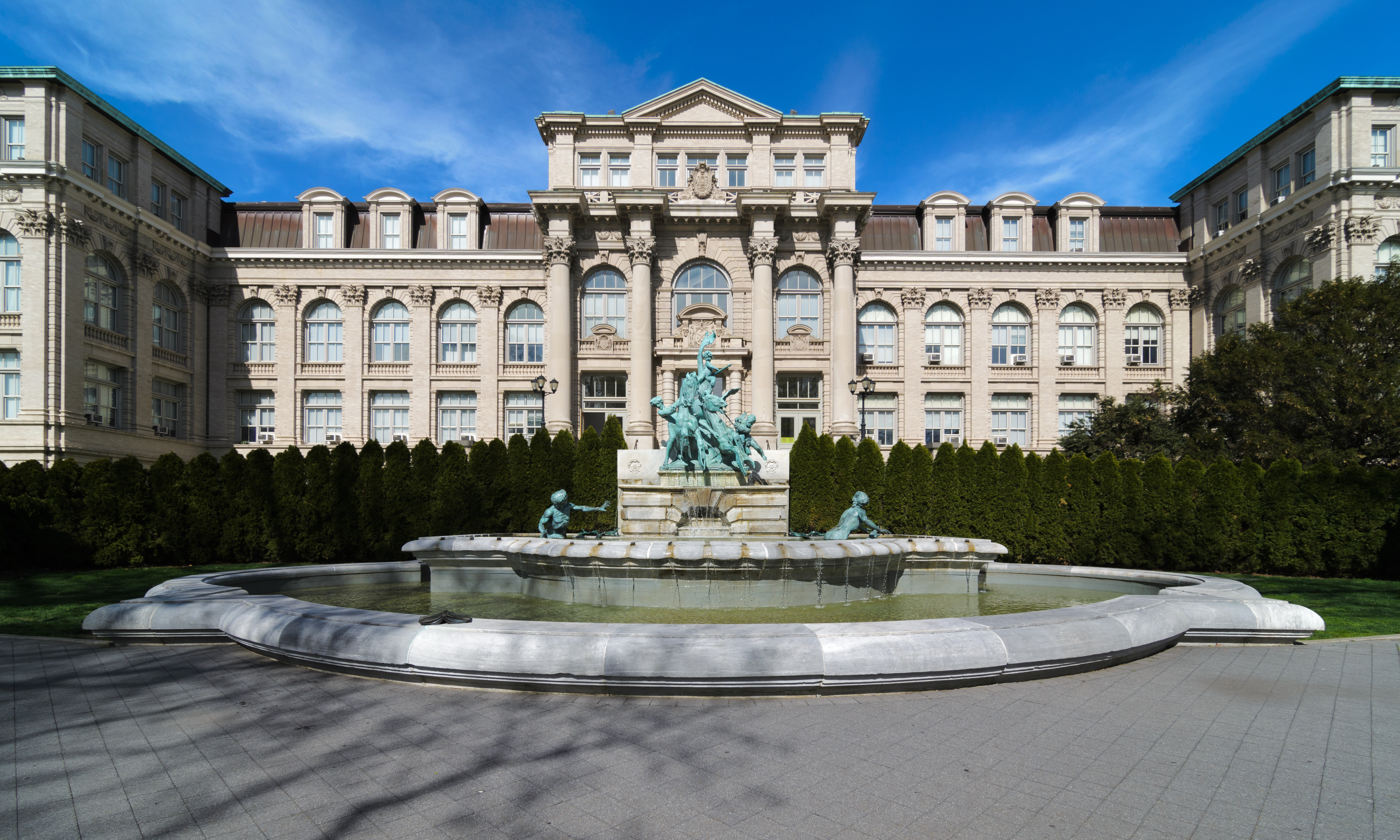
LuEsther T. Mertz Library

Founded in 1899 and named after supporter LuEsther Mertz, the LuEsther T. Mertz Library is located in the northern section of the NYBG. A 2002 New York Times article mentioned that the library had 775,000 items and 6.5 million plant specimens in its collection, while a book published in 2014 by the NYBG mentioned that the library had "550,000 physical volumes and 1,800 journal titles". As of 2016 the Mertz Library still contained one of the world's largest collections of botany-related texts. The library is housed in what was formerly known as the NYBG's Museum Building or Administration Building, which started construction in 1897 and was completed in 1900. The structure was designed by Robert W. Gibson in the Renaissance Revival style.

==== Enid A. Haupt Conservatory ====
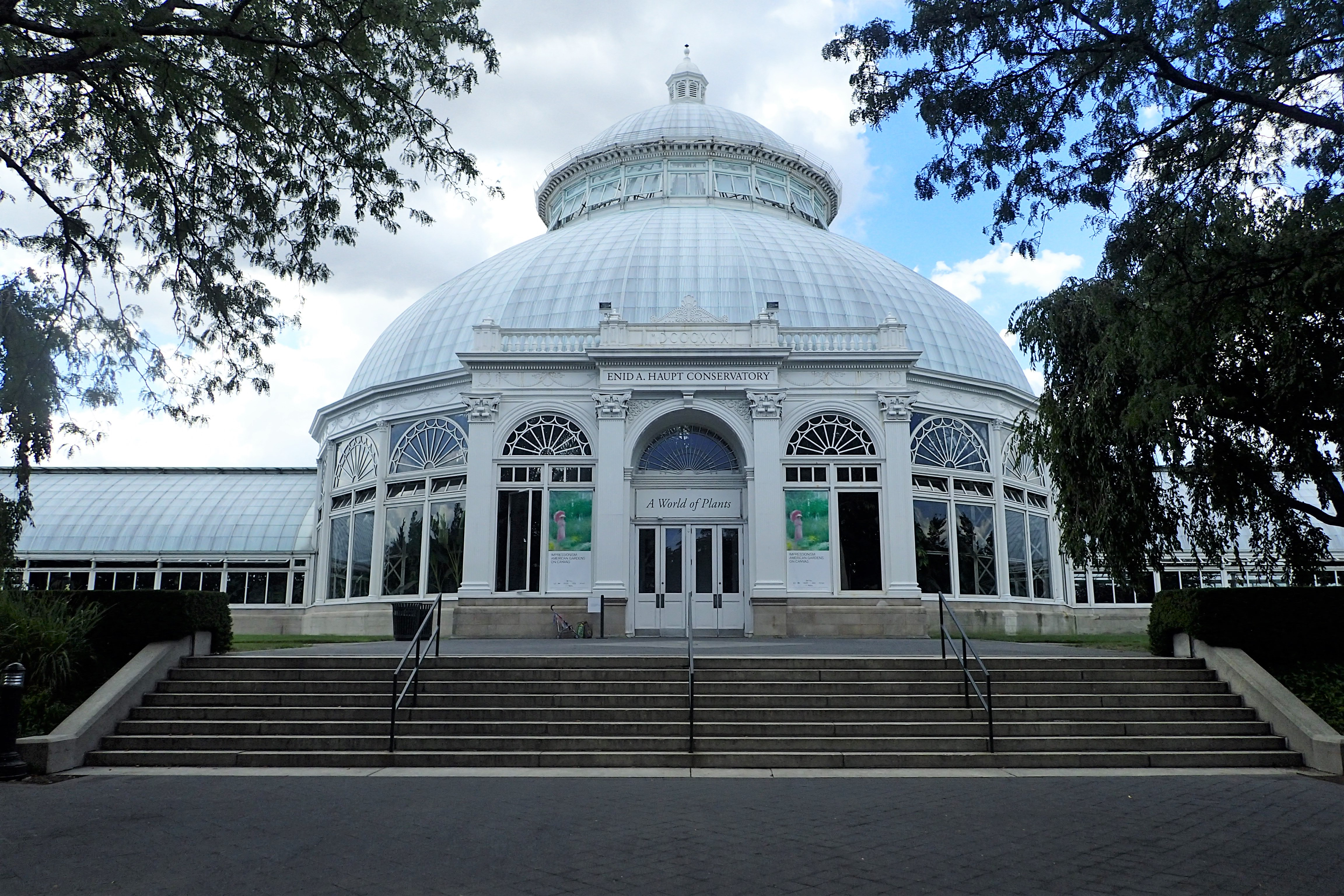
The Haupt Conservatory in fall

The Enid A. Haupt Conservatory, named after Enid A. Haupt, is a greenhouse near the western end of the NYBG. The conservatory was designed by the major greenhouse company of the late 1890s, Lord and Burnham Co. The design was modeled after the Palm House at the Royal Botanic Garden and Joseph Paxton's Crystal Palace in Italian Renaissance style. Groundbreaking took place on January 3, 1899, and the conservatory was completed in 1902 at a cost of $177,000. The building was constructed by John R. Sheehan under contract for the New York City Department of Parks and Recreation. Since the original construction, major renovations took place in 1935, 1950, 1978, and 1993.

The conservatory houses numerous tropical plants and flowers, cacti and other desert plants, and rainforest vegetation. In summer months, the two pools adjacent to the conservatory display many varieties of lotuses and water lilies.

=== William & Lynda Steere Herbarium ===
With approximately 7.8 million specimens, the William & Lynda Steere Herbarium, located in the International Plant Science Center behind the library, is one largest herbarium in the world. Founded in 1891, the herbarium quickly became a repository for many important collections. In 1895 the garden incorporated the herbarium of Columbia College, an acquisition of approximately 600,000 specimens, including the private herbaria of John Torrey and C. F. Meisner. In 1945 the garden incorporated the herbaria of the Columbia College of Pharmacy and Princeton University. The herbarium is named after William Steere (son of William C. Steere) and his wife Lynda, who endowed the herbarium in 2002.

Uniquely among peer institutions, NYBG’s Herbarium collections encompass all plant groups at a global scale (green algae, bryophytes, ferns, gymnosperms, and angiosperms), in addition to organisms that were once considered to be plants but are now understood to represent multiple kingdoms of life (fungi, lichens, red and brown algae, slime molds, cyanobacteria, and Oomycetes). The oldest specimens are from the late 18th century, with most specimens collected during the 20th century. Particular geographic strengths include the North, Central, and South America, the Caribbean, Oceania, and Southeast Asia; particular taxonomic strengths include Apiaceae, Arecaceae, Asteraceae, Burseraceae, Cactaceae, Clusiaceae, Cyperaceae, Ericaceae, Eriocaulaceae, Fabaceae, ferns and lycophytes, gymnosperms, Lamiales, Lauraceae, Lecythidaceae, Malvaceae, Melastomataceae, Ochnaceae, Poaceae, Rosaceae, Rubiaceae, Sarraceniaceae, Solanaceae, and Xyridaceae.

The Index Herbariorum code assigned to this botanic garden is NY and it is used when citing housed specimens.

== Programs ==
In 2008, Alfred P. Sloan Foundation granted the NYBG $572,000 to begin a project called TreeBOL, the Tree Barcode of Life. By sampling the DNA from as many as 100,000 different species of trees from around the world, TreeBOL will document the diversity of plant life, and advance the process of plant DNA barcoding.

A staff of 200 trains 42 doctoral students at a time. Since the 1890s, scientists from the NYBG have mounted about 2,000 exploratory missions worldwide to collect plants in the wild.

=== School of Professional Horticulture ===
In 1932, Thomas H. Everett expanded an existing training program into a robust curriculum for developing professional horticulturists. Patterned after diploma programs at the Royal Botanic Gardens, Kew and the Royal Botanic Garden Edinburgh, the School for Gardeners combined academic studies with hands-on practical experience in a two-year, full-time program. With the exception of a hiatus during and after the Second World War, the School has trained students since then. Now called the School of Professional Horticulture, this fully-accredited program continues to develop horticulturists of the highest caliber for positions in both public and private gardens. After successfully completing the program, students receive The New York Botanical Garden's Diploma in Horticulture.

== Exhibitions ==
The New York Botanical Garden has mounted public exhibitions throughout its history. In 1992, NYBG began presenting what would eventually be called the Holiday Train Show, an annual exhibition of model trains running through a display of New York landmarks made of natural materials. In 2002, it introduced The Orchid Show, an annual exhibition of orchid displays and designed installations with changing themes. Beginning in 2007, the Garden added an annual fall exhibition of kiku, Japanese chrysanthemums trained to grow in modern and ancient forms.

The New York Botanical Garden has also presented large-scale, stand-alone exhibitions, including: Sculpture from the Museum of Modern Art at The New York Botanical Garden (2002), Chihuly at The New York Botanical Garden (2006), Darwin's Garden: An Evolutionary Adventure (2008), Moore in America: Monumental Sculpture at The New York Botanical Garden (2008–2009), Emily Dickinson's Garden: The Poetry of Flowers (2010), Spanish Paradise: Gardens of the Alhambra (2011), Monet's Garden (2012), Manolo Valdés: Monumental Sculpture (2012), Frida Kahlo: Art, Garden, Life (2015), Impressionism: American Gardens on Canvas (2016), CHIHULY (2017), Georgia O'Keeffe: Visions of Hawai'i (2018), Brazilian Modern: The Living Art of Roberto Burle Marx (2019), KUSAMA: Cosmic Nature (2021), ...things come to thrive...in the shedding...in the molting... by Ebony Patterson (2023), and Van Gogh's Flowers (2025).

== Executive leadership ==
- Dr. Nathaniel Lord Britton (1891–1929)
- Elmer D. Merrill (1930–1935)
- Dr. Marshall A. Howe (1935–1936)
- Dr. Henry A. Gleason (acting, 1937–1938)
- Dr. William J. Robbins (1938–1958)
- Dr. William C. Steere (1958–1972)
- Dr. Howard S. Irwin (1973–1979)
- James M. Hester (1980–1989)
- Gregory Long (1989–2018)
- Dr. Carrie Rebora Barratt (2018–2020)
- Jennifer Bernstein (2021–present)

== Publications ==
The NYBG published The Garden Journal (ISSN 0016-4585) from 1977 to 1990 and from 1931 has produced the scientific journal, Brittonia.

== Landmark status ==
The New York Botanical Garden was declared a National Historic Landmark District in 1967. In addition, three structures are designated as individual New York City landmarks: the Enid A. Haupt Conservatory (designated in 1973), the LuEsther T. Mertz Library (2009), and the Lorillard Snuff Mill (1966, also separately on the National Register of Historic Places).

== See also ==
- Education in New York City
- List of herbaria in North America
- List of botanical gardens and arboretums in New York
- List of museums and cultural institutions in New York City
- List of National Historic Landmarks in New York City
- National Register of Historic Places listings in Bronx County, New York
- Other botanical gardens in New York City
  - Brooklyn Botanic Garden
  - Queens Botanical Garden
  - Staten Island Botanical Garden
