= Enid A. Haupt Conservatory =

Greenhouse in the Bronx, New York

Coordinates: 40°51′50″N 73°52′55″W

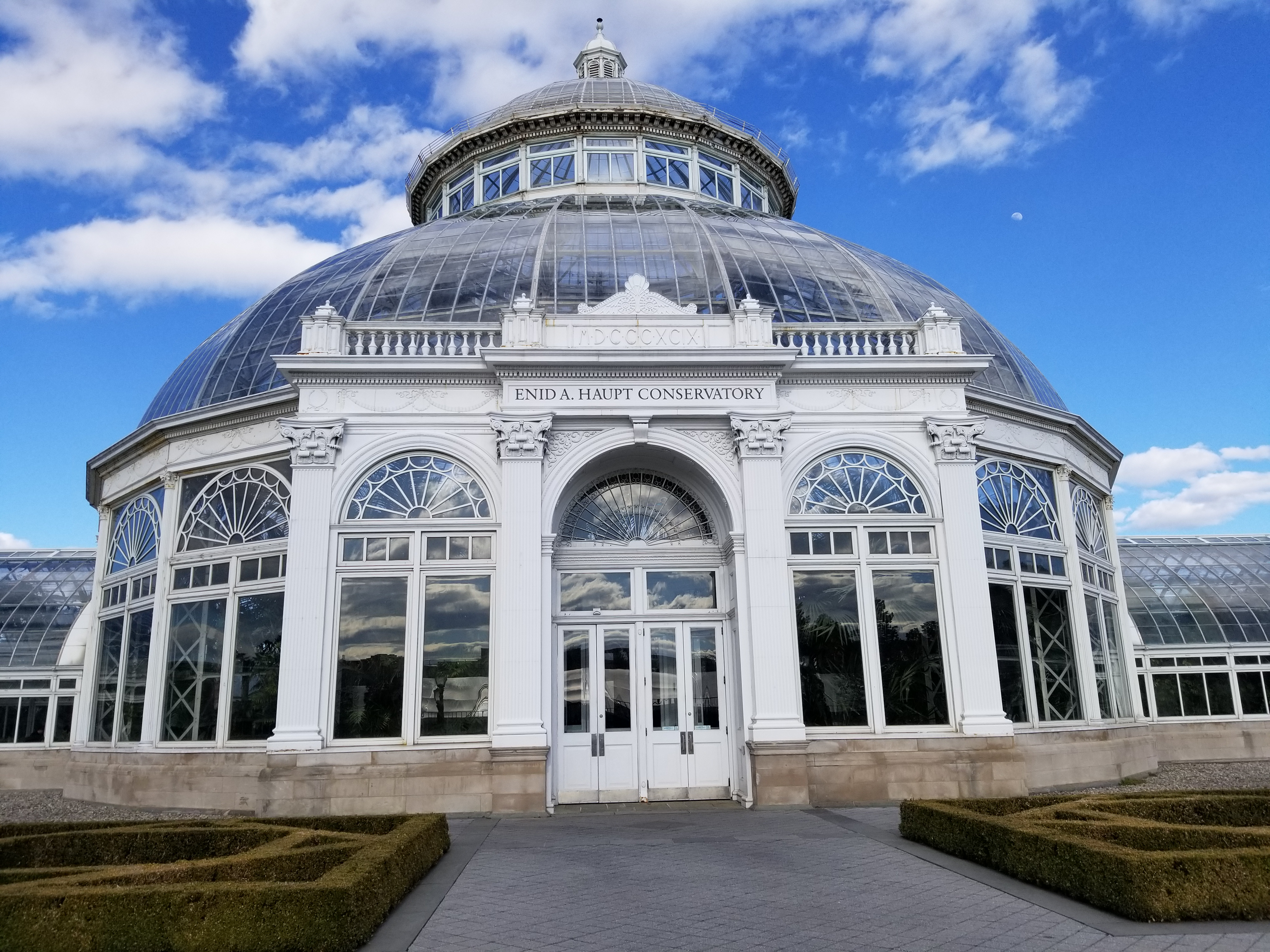
Haupt Conservatory in winter

The Enid A. Haupt Conservatory is a greenhouse at the New York Botanical Garden (NYBG) in the Bronx, New York, United States. The conservatory was designed by Lord & Burnham Co. in the Italian Renaissance style. Its major design features are inspired by the Palm House at the Royal Botanic Gardens at Kew, and Joseph Paxton's Crystal Palace.

Groundbreaking took place on January 3, 1899, and construction was completed in 1902 at a cost of $177,000. The building was constructed by John R. Sheehan under contract for the New York City Department of Parks and Recreation. Since the original construction, major renovations took place in 1935, 1950, 1978, and 1993. By the 1970s, the building was in a state of extreme disrepair and had to be either substantially rebuilt or torn down. Enid Annenberg Haupt saved the conservatory from demolition with a $5 million contribution for renovation and a $5 million endowment for maintenance of the building. A subsequent renovation, which started in 1978, restored the conservatory closer to its original design, which had been compromised during the 1935 and 1950 renovations. Due to her contributions, the Conservatory was named the Enid A. Haupt Conservatory in 1978.

The 1993 renovation replaced the inner workings of the conservatory. At this time, the mechanical systems to control temperature, humidity, and ventilation were upgraded to computerized systems. The exhibits were also redesigned. The conservatory serves as a focal point of the park and a center for education. It is a New York City designated landmark and is located inside the New York Botanical Garden's National Historic Landmark District designation.

== History ==
The New York Botanical Garden (NYBG) was inspired when Nathaniel Lord Britton and his wife Elizabeth Gertrude Britton visited the Royal Botanic Gardens, Kew in 1888. The NYBG was established in 1891 by act of the New York State Legislature, which among other things, established a board of directors whose job was to raise money for the garden. The principal officers of the new corporation set up for the garden were Cornelius Vanderbilt, Andrew Carnegie and J.P. Morgan, with Nathaniel Lord Britton as the new secretary. The commission to design the Conservatory was given to the greenhouse firm Lord & Burnham very early in the process. The primary designer of the building was William R. Cobb, an architect employed by Lord & Burnham. The new Conservatory was primarily made of steel, cast iron, wood and glass.

The original design remained largely intact until the 1935 and 1950 renovations, which significantly compromised the original design. During these renovations, much of the elaborate decoration was removed. The 1935 renovation, in particular, was described as "an attempt to halt the deterioration of the endangered building and bring it up to the prevailing taste of European Modernism." Due to the conservatory's history and success, it was dedicated as a New York City landmark in 1976. However, by 1978, the Conservatory was in a state of extreme disrepair and was slated for demolition due to a lack of funding for its renovation. Following Enid Annenberg Haupt's endowment, Edward Larrabee Barnes was the architect for the renovation and the conservatory was renamed the Enid A. Haupt Conservatory.

A $25 million renovation was completed by Beyer Blinder Belle Architects in 1997. The mechanical systems to control temperature, humidity, and ventilation were upgraded to computerized systems. The new systems allow optimal growing conditions for a greater variety of plants. This opportunity led to a redesign of the exhibits, which has remained largely intact. The redesign created a transitioning environment through the pavilions that conveys a trip over mountains from wet western slopes, up through the rainforest and down into the desert.

The palm dome of the conservatory is vulnerable to rust and structural damage because it houses palms, cycads, and ferns that require high temperature and high humidity. For this reason, the palm dome has been renovated multiple times, most recently in May 2019.

== Design ==
=== Architects ===
The original architect for the conservatory was the greenhouse company Lord & Burnham, which was "the premier glasshouse design and fabrication firm of the time" and completed several large commissions in addition to the NYBG Conservatory. The firm, founded in 1856 by Frederick A. Lord, was joined in 1872 by Lord's son-in-law William Addison Burnham. Among their more notable works were the Conservatory of Flowers, built 1877 at Golden Gate Park in San Francisco, as well as greenhouses built in 1881 on the estate of Jay Gould in Irvington, New York, which were said to be the first steel-frame glass houses constructed in the United States. In addition to their embrace of new materials, Lord & Burnham was innovative in the development of boilers (which were a key part of the greenhouses' functioning).

Lord & Burnham was awarded the commission to design the conservatory in 1896. William R. Cobb was the architect working for Lord & Burnham who was in charge of the design of the conservatory. He served as the first vice president, secretary, and general sales manager of Lord & Burnham, and had designed many parks, conservatories, and private estates throughout the country.

=== Site and context ===
The original architect for the NYBG was Calvert Vaux (co-designer of Central Park). He served as an adviser during the formulation of the preliminary design along with Samuel Parsons. The plan they developed together was submitted in 1896 (shortly after Vaux's death), and was ultimately followed almost exactly, except for the location of the conservatory.

From the time the land was secured for the park nearly until the Conservatory construction began, the placement of the conservatory within the park was heavily debated. The advisory committee of the Parks Department favored a formal spatial arrangement of buildings within the park, while the NYBG disagreed; they believed greater separation of the buildings would ease the management and supervision of crowds. Ultimately, the conservatory was placed away from other buildings in the park. At the time this was an unusual arrangement, as the conservatory had no axial or visual connection to the museum or any other buildings in the park.

The site chosen in 1898 was an open field; some have suggested this open site was chosen to save existing trees. Additionally, the chosen site placed the conservatory in a location where the building is visible from the boundary streets along the south and west of the park. Southern Boulevard and other adjacent streets were realigned and reorganized when the site was developed. The arrangement created visibility of the conservatory from the road and presented the building as a public icon, relationships which still remain.

Equally important to the overall placement of the building within the park was the development of the immediately surrounding gardens. The adjacent gardens were considered important supporting resources to the conservatory, and also related to the geometry of the building. "The elaborate, multiple domes style of the Conservatory and its topographic position above the surrounding grades dictated the clean lines and geometries of the surrounding paths, sloping terraces, and planting beds, further integration building and setting". All of the adjacent garden elements were formal, geometric, and orthogonal to reflect the architecture of the Conservatory.

=== Materials and methods ===
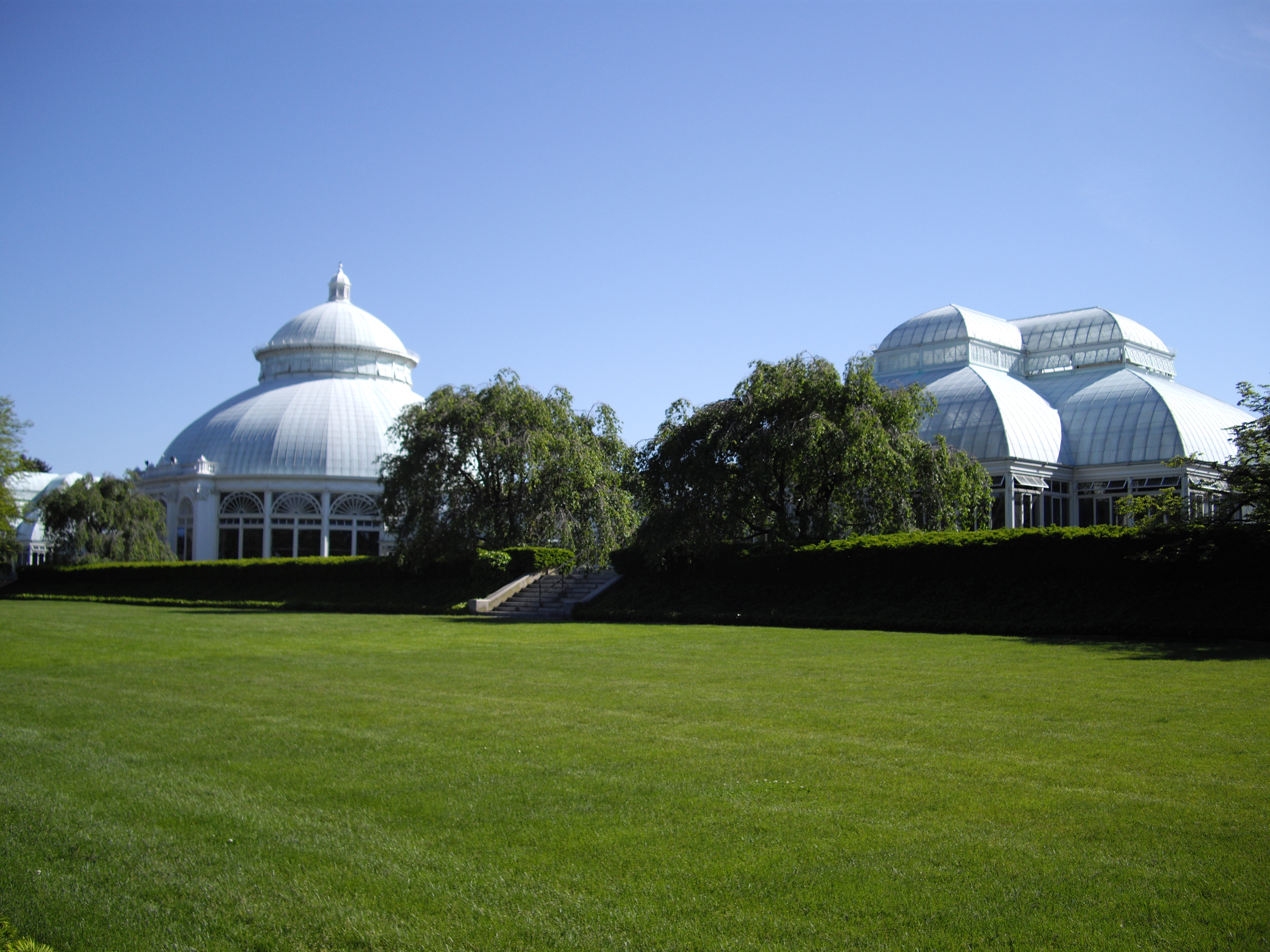
In 2008

The main materials used in the construction of the conservatory were steel and glass, in addition to a range of materials used for the base, ornament, and waterproofing. The main structure of the building was made of steel although a few of the pavilions had wrought iron columns. Also, wood beams were used in some locations. Later renovations to the building altered some aspects of the structure. For example, many steel elements were replaced and wood beams were replaced with steel.

Glazing was clearly the other major element in the conservatory. Standardized sized glass panes were used to the greatest extent possible, with 16-inch (410 mm) panels cut to length in all pavilions except the Palm House (the main pavilion.) The Palm House incorporated 20-inch (510 mm) glass. All pavilions called for second quality French and American glass. Additionally, clear and ground glass was used depending on the orientation of the glass. All vertical glass was left clear while certain portions of the roof glass were ground. However, the ground glass was not alone sufficient to provide shading and additional means were employed which would allow for modification depending on seasonal conditions. Stippling and waterproof movable shades were used for additional shade control.

In addition to the structural and glazing systems, a variety of other materials were used for the base of the building, the waterproofing, ornament, and other secondary functions. Bluestone, Buff Bedford Stone, North River brick, and Tennessee marble were used for the masonry work. For leaders and gutters throughout most of the building, copper flashing was used. In some areas cast iron was used for the gutter system. Cast iron was also used for sills, friezes, columns, railings, mullions, transom bars, and snowguards.

While the conservatory has undergone many renovations since the original construction, the same palette of materials has generally been maintained. However, the building systems behind what visitors see have been greatly altered in major efforts to maintain the best possible environment for the plants inside. Though technology has advanced greatly, the commitment to state-of-the-art systems has remained unchanged since the earliest boiler systems installed by Lord & Burnham.

=== Form and use ===
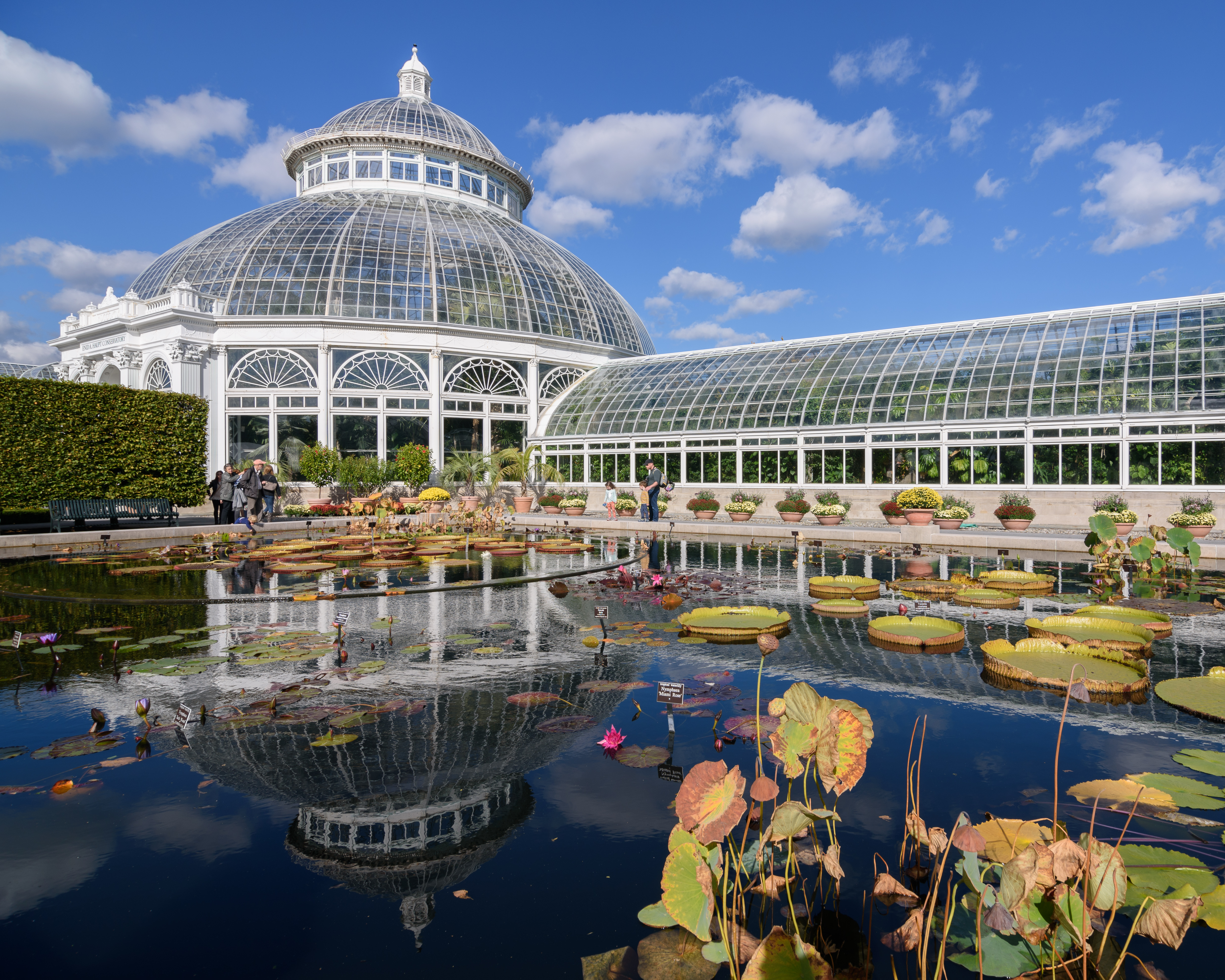
Conservatory interior courtyard with pool

The conservatory form developed as a combination of the latest technologies in greenhouse design and more traditional ideas of ornament. The overall shape and layout of the building is geared both towards the functional aspects of the interior greenhouse spaces as well as creating a monumental form from the exterior to portray the significance of the building. Lord & Burnham made heavy use of ornament at the conservatory and was a trademark aspect of their civic and public conservatories. The heavy ornamentation here and in other buildings at the time was an essential element in defining the building's status and historical appearance.

The building is a series of large glass pavilions that are all very open on the inside (typical of greenhouses). The pavilions are laid out symmetrically around the large central Palm House pavilion. In plan the building is divided into eleven pavilions, where each pavilion has a distinct geometry defining it in relationship to adjacent pavilions. Together the pavilions form a 512-foot-long (156 m) "C"-shape with the central pavilion (with its 90-foot-high (27 m) grand dome) in the center. The use of ornament creates a hierarchy among the pavilions. The central dome is the most elaborate, followed by the corner and end pavilions. The interconnecting pavilions are the least ornamented.

Functionally, each pavilion houses a different group of plants representing various conditions found around the globe. The configuration of the building into distinct pavilions allows for each of these global regions to be treated separately in terms of the temperature and humidity maintained for the plants. While the collections have changed over time, the basic concept of display has remained fairly consistent. The base collection is generally permanent, with additional plants brought in for special exhibitions throughout the year. For example, there is an extensive orchid show every spring that draws many visitors to the Conservatory. During the orchid show, thousands of orchids are brought in and are incorporated into the existing collection.

The conservatory is a major resource in the international study of horticulture as well as a center for learning for the public. For example, every year hundreds of scientists travel to the conservatory to study the rare palm and cacti exhibits. The original goal of the conservatory to serve as a center of learning and to advance knowledge of the art and science of horticulture has remained intact since the opening of the conservatory and park. Additional greenhouses have been built on the grounds of the NYBG to provide additional space for research. These greenhouses are a tremendous resource for scientists while also supporting exhibits in the main Conservatory. As a symbol of the NYBG however, the conservatory remains the main draw of the park and its form has developed an iconic status in New York City and beyond.
