= Rough Brothers, Inc =

Rough Brothers Inc.
- Industry: Greenhouses
- Founded: 1932
- Headquarters: Cincinnati, Ohio, United States
- Area served: Worldwide
- Key people: Richard Reilly; President
- Products: Greenhouses and Conservatories
- Website: roughbros.com

Rough Brothers, Inc. (pronounced RAUH) is a privately held greenhouse manufacturing and restoration company based in Cincinnati, Ohio. Founded in 1932, Rough Brothers designs, manufactures, and installs greenhouse structures and systems for commercial purposes, research and teaching, retail garden centers, and conservatories. Rough Brothers was acquired by Gibraltar Industries, a manufactured goods corporation, in June 2015 and has two sister companies, RBI Solar and RBI Structures. The company currently has facilities in Cincinnati, Ohio.

== Company history ==
=== 1932-1949 ===
Rough Brothers was founded by two brothers, Earl M. Rough and Robert T. Rough, from Indiana in 1932. From the creation of their company until the onset of World War II the brothers repaired and maintained greenhouses in the Indianapolis, IN area. In 1946, the Roughs decided to form a company that would provide additional greenhouse services for commercial growers, including turn-key construction and a full line of building materials and equipment. With this expansion of services, brothers Worth Rough and George Rough were brought into the team, along with family friend Carl Trinkle. Their first commercial greenhouse projects were developed in the Midwest and later throughout the United States.

=== 1950-1980 ===
In the 1950s, Worth Rough left the company to operate his own greenhouse business in California, and George Rough left to become a farmer. Robert Rough died in 1969. Earl Rough, one of the original founders, retired from presidency in 1970 but continued to advise the company's management. His son Cliff became the sales manager. Carl Trinkle remained as the supervisor of Rough Brothers installation crews and took an active role in sales. When the original Rough Brothers was purchased in 1977, the company had set its focus on the commercial grower market: growers of bedding plants, cut flowers, and vegetables for sale to homeowners or independent garden centers. Under the new leadership of president Albert (Al) Reilly and vice president Bruce H. Rowe, Rough Brothers redirected its focus to conservatories, research facilities, and the restoration of existing greenhouse structures. With these changes, the company expanded its production space and increased its team of in-house designers and engineers.

=== 1981-2000 ===
In 1988, Rough Brothers acquired Lord & Burnham, a noted American boiler and greenhouse manufacturer who until that point had constructed 90% of conservatories in the US. This acquisition included their drawings, conservatory details, and equipment. Three years later, Rough Brothers vice president Bruce Rowe left the company, and president Al Reilly bought Rowe's share in the business. With the boom of large national retailers in the greenhouse industry in the 1990s, Rough Brothers decided to create specialized teams to address the specific needs of each market segment, including institutional (research and education markets), conservatory (conservatory construction and restoration), commercial (growers and independent retailers), and mass retail (garden centers). Growth within the mass retail sector allowed Rough Brothers to expand their manufacturing shop, including a specialized steel fabrication shop, a fabric shop for signage, and larger shipping and staging areas. Expansions to their Cincinnati, Ohio corporate office facilitated the creation of a specialized mass retail team focused specifically on Home Depot, Lowes, and other retailers. This team of project managers, construction managers, designers, and engineers handles the project bidding, construction, maintenance, and warranties. In 1995, Rough Brothers was named the Greater Cincinnati Small Business of the Year.

=== 2002-present ===
Richard Reilly, Al Reilly's son, became president of Rough Brothers in 2002. Two other greenhouse companies, XS Smith, Inc. and Golden Pacific Structures, were acquired by Rough brothers in 2013, again increasing the resources available to the company. As part of this acquisition, Rough Brothers utilized the XS Smith production facility in North Carolina as another manufacturing facility. In 2015, Rough Brothers was acquired by Gibraltar Industries, a manufactured goods corporation based in Hamburg, New York. In 2016, Gibraltar acquired Nexus Greenhouse Systems based in Northglenn, CO and Pana, IL. In 2017, XS Smith was Closed. In 2020, Thermo Energy was acquired. In 2021, the Delta T line was discontinued. In May 2021, the company was rebranded to Prospiant, Inc.

== Greenhouse Construction ==
The first Rough Brothers greenhouses were constructed with wood frames. As greenhouse and manufacturing technology advanced, the company began building with steel and aluminum, and became an early adopter of polyethylene and fiberglass insulating materials. After World War II, Rough Brothers also began manufacturing products to their own design and specifications. They sold the portable Steam-Flo Soil Sterilizer and utilized heat-conserving devices like air-inflated double wall plastic and fiberglass paneling. Rough Brothers also adopted and refined a poly arch system of greenhouse construction. The company's Snap-Lock insert for poly insulating systems has been tested and recommended by the Ohio Agricultural Research and Development Center. Today, Rough Brothers has four divisions: institutional (research and education markets), conservatory (conservatory construction and restoration), commercial (growers and independent retailers), and mass retail (garden centers).

== Major Projects ==
=== US Botanic Garden ===
The US Botanic Garden in Washington, D.C., a 100-year-old greenhouse located on the grounds of the United States Capital Building closed in 1997 for renovation. In 1999, Rough Brothers became a subcontractor on the $30 million restoration. Under its $7.75 million contract, Rough Brothers replaced nearly 2 acres of aluminum glazing on the conservatory and replaced hundreds of thousands of glass panes with laminated shatterproof glass.

=== Cincinnati Zoo Conservatory ===
Rough Brothers constructed the Harold C. Schott Education Center conservatory at the Cincinnati Zoo. The 31,000 square foot facility accommodates the Cincinnati Zoo's educational programming and includes a 350-seat auditorium, ten classrooms, a distance learning studio, and a 5,000 square foot “Discovery Forest” greenhouse of plants and animals.

=== Roger Williams Park Botanical Center ===
The Roger Williams Park Botanical Center opened to the public on March 2, 2007. The botanical center includes a nearly 6,000 square foot conservatory housing plant displays, another 6,000 square feet of greenhouse garden space, and education center.

=== Lauritzen Gardens Conservatory ===
The Lauritzen Gardens Conservatory in Omaha, Nebraska was a $31.5 million project covering 20,000 square feet. The conservatory contains three sections, a 10,000 square foot tropical house, a 5,300 square foot temperate house, and a 2,000 square foot gallery for floral displays and events.
