= Lorillard Snuff Mill =

Manufacturing building in the Bronx, New York

- U.S. National Register of Historic Places
- U.S. National Historic Landmark
- U.S. National Historic Landmark District – Contributing property
- New York State Register of Historic Places
- New York City Landmark
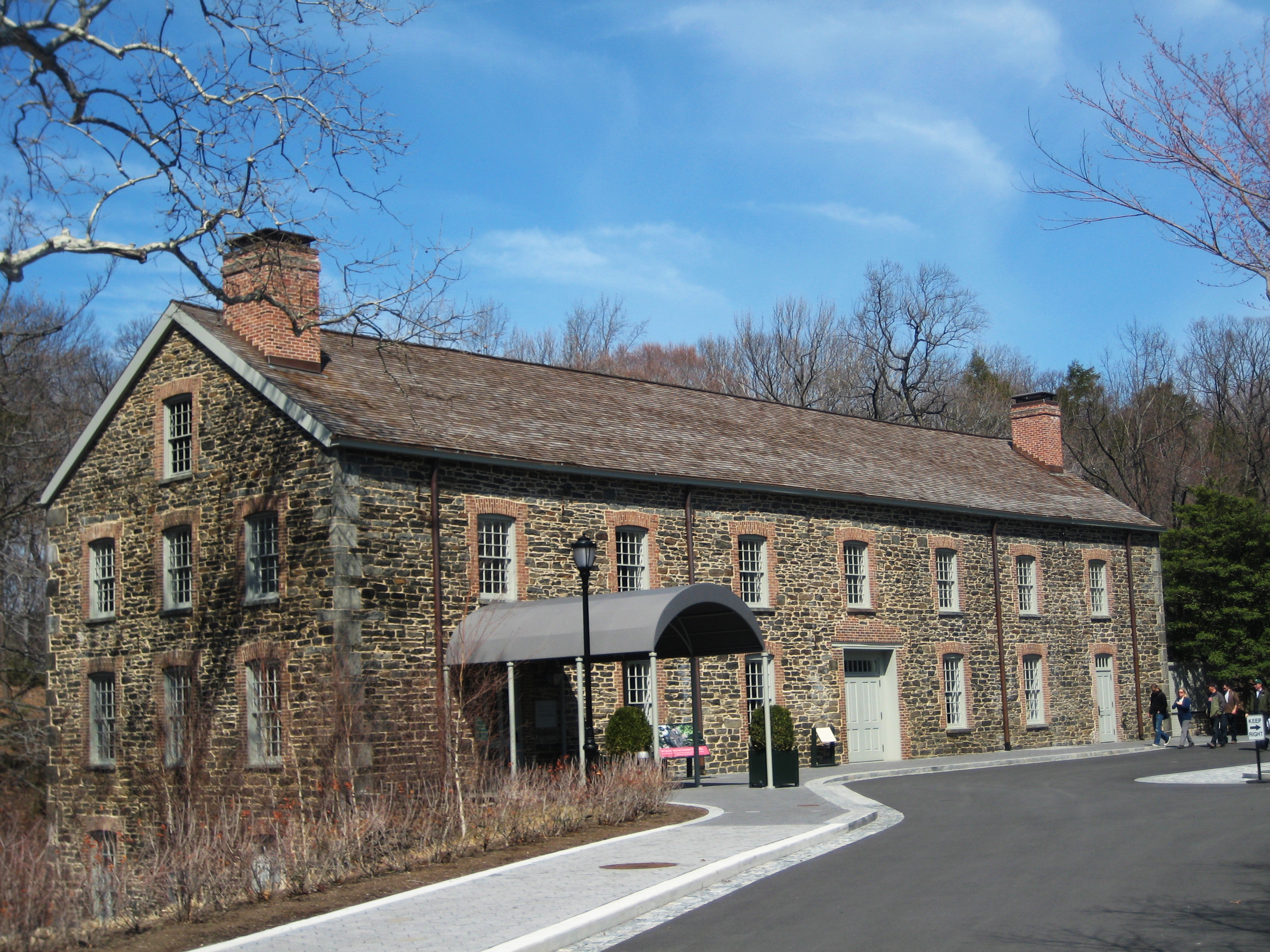
- Lorillard Snuff Mill in 2011

- Location within New York City Location within New York Location within the United States
- Location: Snuff Mill Road, New York Botanical Garden, Bronx, New York
- Coordinates: 40.859681°N 73.876174°W
- Area: 5 acres (2.0 ha)
- Built: 1840
- Architect: P. Lorillard Co.
- Part of: New York Botanical Garden (ID67000009)
- NRHP reference No.: 77000935
- NYSRHP No.: 00501.000001
- NYCL No.: 0121

Significant dates
- Added to NRHP: December 22, 1977
- Designated NHL: December 22, 1977
- Designated NHLDCP: May 28, 1967
- Designated NYSRHP: June 23, 1980
- Designated NYCL: April 19, 1966

The Lorillard Snuff Mill now known as the Lillian and Amy Goldman Stone Mill, is the oldest existing tobacco manufacturing building in the United States. It was built around 1840 next to the Bronx River in the Bronx, New York to supplement an earlier building of the same function. The schist rock that makes up its walls was quarried locally. It was declared a National Historic Landmark in 1977. It is located inside the New York Botanical Garden, itself a National Historic Landmark District.

== History ==
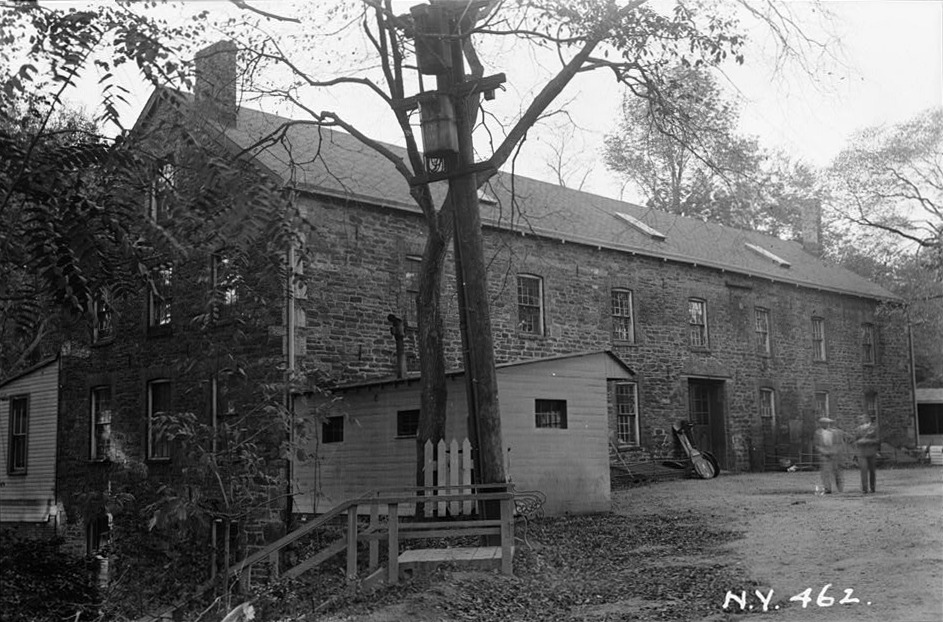
The snuff mill in 1936

The Lorillard firm was founded by Pierre Abraham Lorillard in 1760. His two sons, Peter and George, took over after he was killed during the American Revolutionary War, and they moved the manufacturing portion of the business to this location in the Bronx in 1792.

Peter Lorillard III built a forty-five room mansion, stone cottage and stables nearby. The mansion burned in 1923. The Lorillard company and family left the property in the Bronx in 1870 after relocating their business to Jersey City, NJ. The land was purchased by the New York City government in 1884 and was transferred to the New York Botanical Garden in 1915.

The Mill was retained by New York City Department of Parks and Recreation and used for storage and shops. In 1937 it was transferred to the Botanical Garden along with several other small parcels. The Mill was renovated in 1952-54. A cafe and patio were installed on the lower side facing the Bronx River, and a meeting room was fashioned from the space that once held snuff-grinding equipment. The building had a $10.5 million restoration in 2010. It is now used for staff offices and a catering facility.

== See also ==
- List of New York City Designated Landmarks in The Bronx
- National Register of Historic Places in Bronx County, New York
