= Thain Family Forest =

Old-growth forest in the Bronx, New York

Coordinates: 40°51′52″N 73°52′33″W

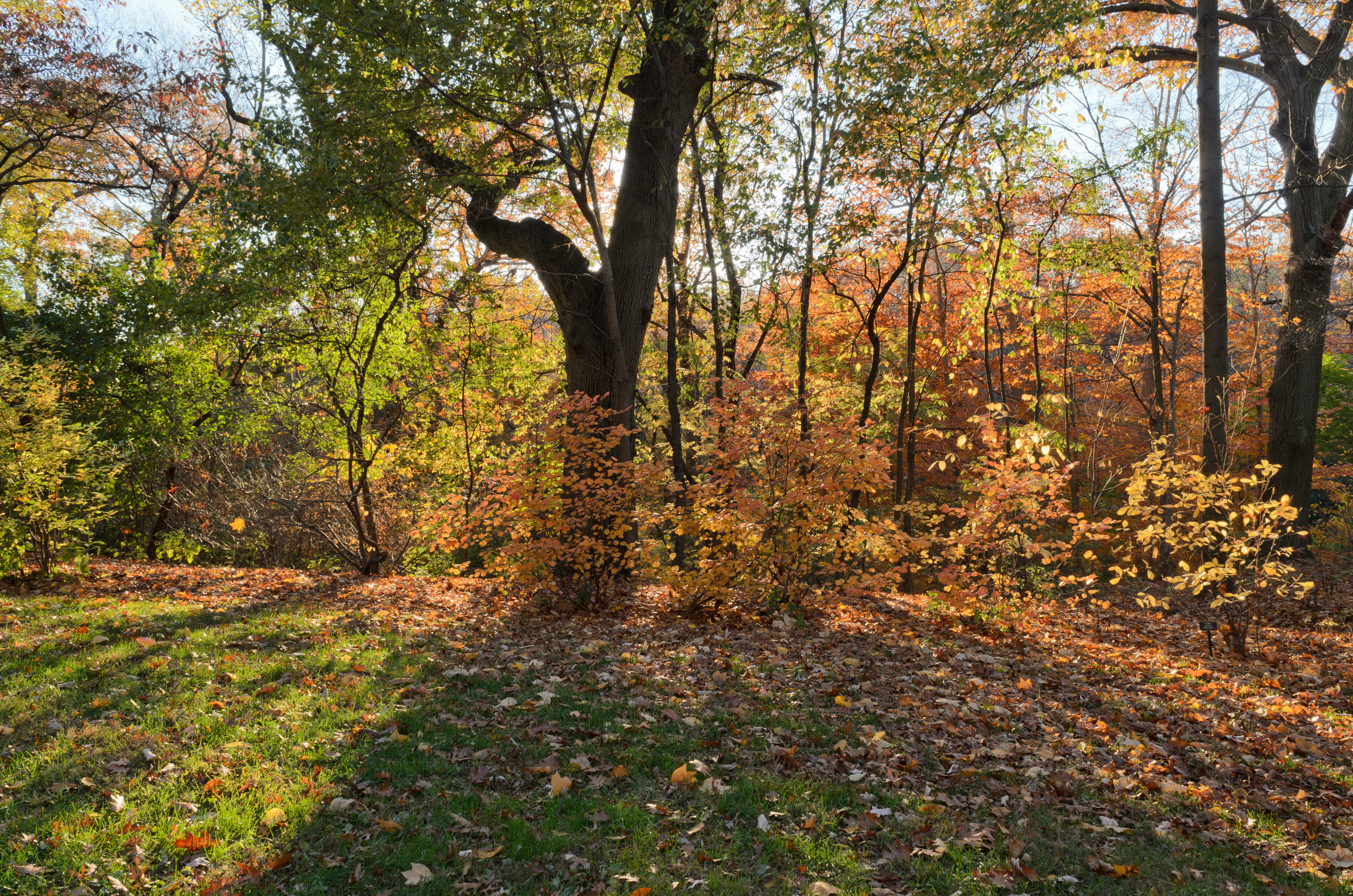
Oaks in the Thain Family Forest, 2015.

The Thain Family Forest is a 50-acre (20 ha) section of old-growth forest along the Bronx River in the New York Botanical Garden, for a time known as the Native Forest and historically as the Hemlock Grove. Its heritage dates in part to pre-colonial Lenapehoking. New York City acquired 4,000 acres (~1620 ha) as parkland in 1888, and in 1895 the New York Botanical Garden site was chosen here primarily due to the presence of the forest, which covers about one-fifth of the garden grounds. Founding director Nathaniel Lord Britton described the site as "the most precious natural possession of the city of New York". The canopy is in various zones such as oak, hemlock, beech, sweet gum and mixed. The eastern hemlock, the forest's original namesake, declined in the early 20th century, due to the hemlock woolly adelgid and the elongate hemlock scale. Its 2011 redevelopment was supported by John Thain and Carmen Thain, and included the removal of non-native species as well as the expansion of native ones. Several walking trails traverse the forest. Appointed in 2021, Eliot Nagele serves as the director of the Thain Family Forest.
