= River Avenue Skate Park =

Skatepark in the Bronx, New York

- River Ave
- Interactive map of River Avenue Skate Park
- Type: Skate park
- Location: Bronx, New York
- Coordinates: 40.826590°N 73.929830°W
- Area: 10,000 Sq Ft
- Created: New York City Department of Parks and Recreation
- Established: 2010
- Open: All year
- Terrain: Concrete
- Public transit: B, D train to 161st Yankee Stadium Station

River Avenue Skate Park is a skate park located in the south Bronx built in 2010 and located next to the B and D train.

== History ==
The River Ave Skate Park is built on the site of a former Yankee Stadium parking lot. The River Ave Skate Park is part of River Avenue Parks, a series of parks built to offset the public space lost in Macombs Dam Park during the construction of Yankee stadium. The annual Battle For The Bronx Contest is hosted at the park.
