= Lord & Burnham =

Coordinates: 41°02′23″N 73°52′22″W

- Industry: manufacturing
- Founded: 1849 in Buffalo, New York
- Founders: Frederick A. Lord and William Addison Burnham
- Defunct: 1988
- Headquarters: United States
- Area served: United States
- Products: Boilers, greenhouses, and conservatories
- Website: Lord & Burnham Archives & Historic Plans

Lord & Burnham was a noted American boiler and greenhouse manufacturer, and builders of major public conservatories in the United States.

== History ==
The company began in 1849 when Frederick A. Lord, a carpenter, started building wood and glass greenhouses for neighbors in Buffalo, New York. It became Lord's full-time profession in 1856 as production moved to Syracuse, New York and then to Irvington, New York to be closer to his customers in the large Hudson River estates. In 1872 Lord's son-in-law William Addison Burnham joined the firm. Their first major commission came in the 1876 when California philanthropist James Lick hired the firm to create a 12,000-square-foot (1,100 m^{2}) conservatory similar to that in Kew Gardens. Its parts were fabricated in New York and shipped to California by boat around Cape Horn. Lick died before the greenhouse could be constructed, but the materials were used to build the Conservatory of Flowers in San Francisco's Golden Gate Park.

In 1881 the firm constructed the first steel-framed curvilinear greenhouse in the United States for railroad magnate Jay Gould, on a property now open as Lyndhurst. In 1883 the partnership incorporated as Lord's Horticultural Manufacturing Company, and in 1890 the name was changed to today's Lord & Burnham Company.

Beginning in 1894, the company purchased underwater property beyond the tracks in Irvington and began filling in to create new land for an expansion. The expansion complex was completed by 1912, at which time the company employed 250 men.

The company used the property as additional factory space in the production process of their greenhouses. By 1988, only about a dozen employees remained at the Irvington factory, and Lord and Burnham ceased to exist when the factory closed in that year.

== 2018 acquisition ==
The engineering and manufacturing assets of Lord & Burnham's line of residential greenhouses were acquired in 2018 by Arcadia GlassHouse LLC from Under Glass Manufacturing Company. Arcadia GlassHouse continues to manufacture replacement parts and residential greenhouse kits with the original Lord & Burnham design.

Rough Brothers also derives products from the Lord & Burnham name and product line.

William Addison Burnham continued to make boilers and the company he founded, Burnham Commercial, continues to do so today.

== Conservatories ==
The company's early greenhouses were made of cypress before switching to iron or steel. Although experimentation with aluminum began in 1932 with the United States Botanic Garden, commercial production was not economical until 1955.

Major Lord & Burnham conservatories include:

- Conservatory of Flowers, Golden Gate Park, San Francisco, California, 1878-1879, a wood-and-glass greenhouse
- Lyndhurst Estate, Tarrytown, New York, 1881
- Phipps Conservatory & Botanical Gardens, Schenley Park, Pittsburgh, 1892–1893
- Buffalo and Erie County Botanical Gardens, Buffalo, New York, 1895–1899
- New York Botanical Garden, 1899–1902
- Sonnenberg Gardens and Mansion State Historic Park, Canandaigua, New York, 1903–1915
- Reynolda Gardens, Wake Forest University, Winston-Salem, North Carolina 1912
- United States Botanic Garden, Washington, DC, 1933
- Volunteer Park Conservatory, Volunteer Park, Seattle, Washington, 1912
- Krohn Conservatory, Eden Park, Cincinnati, built 1933, restored by Lord & Burnham in 1966

== Company archives and historic plans ==
The title to the company's archives was given to the Archives of the New York Botanical Garden in 1990, along with their historic architectural plans. The collection includes over 140,000 architectural plans for more than 7,000 glass structures.

== Gallery ==
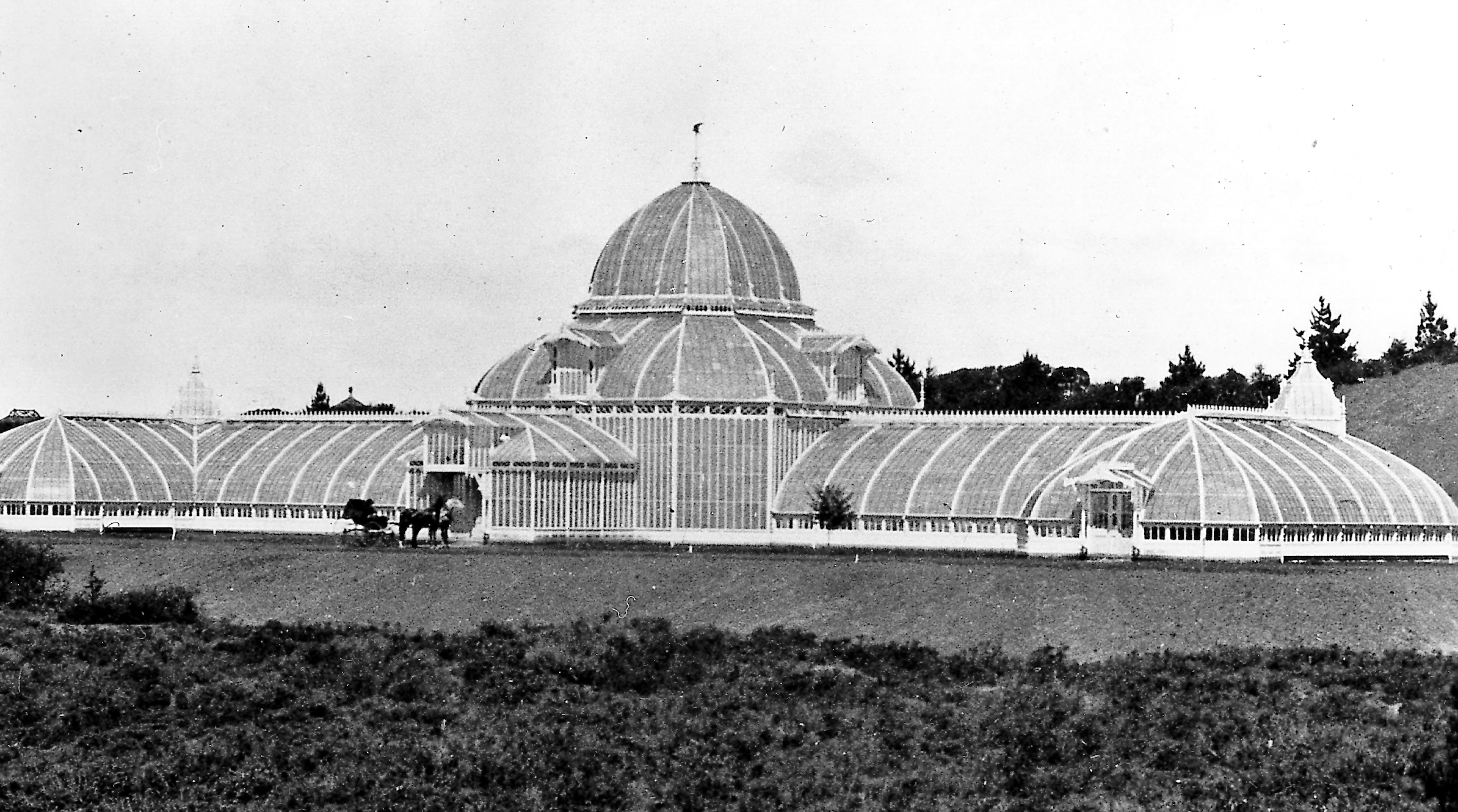
The Conservatory of Flowers as it appeared in 1879, before its dome was replaced following a fire in 1883

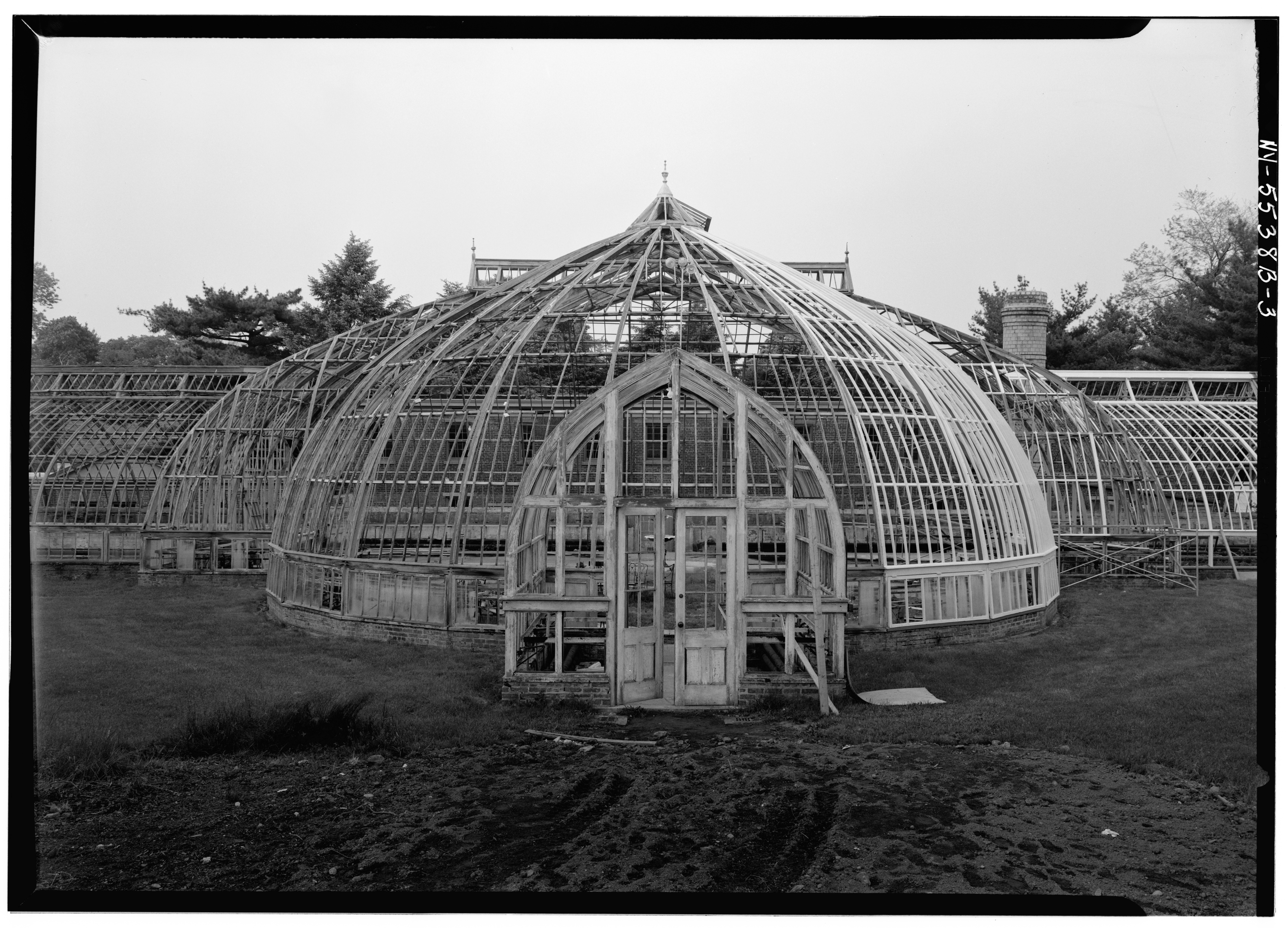
Detail of the central pavilion of the greenhouse at Lyndhurst, Jay Gould's estate in Tarrytown, New York (1971)

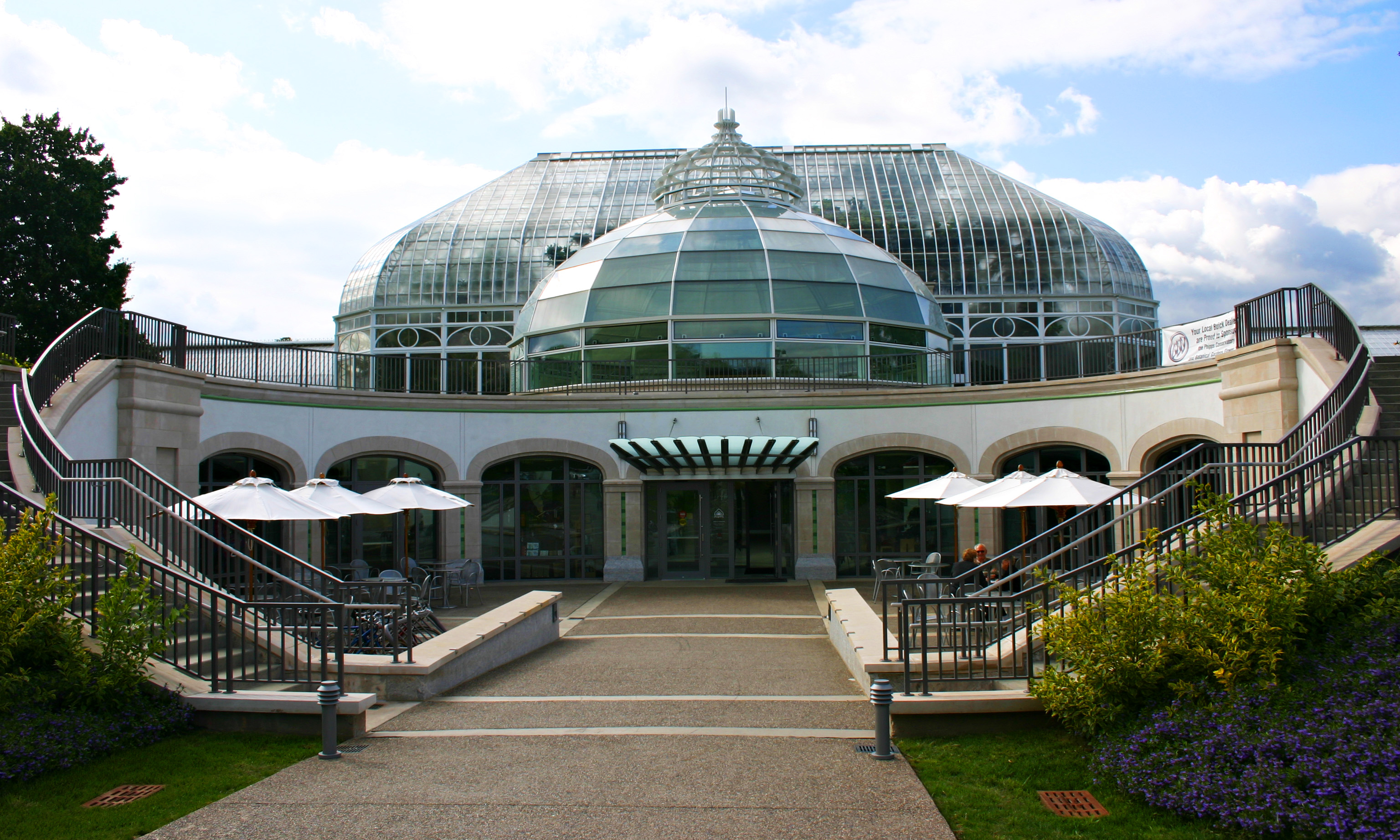
Phipps Conservatory, Pittsburgh, Pennsylvania
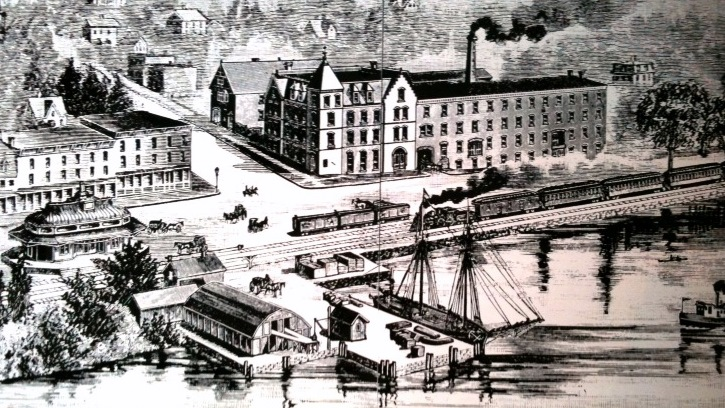
The Lord & Burnham Building on the Irvington, New York waterfront in the 1800s

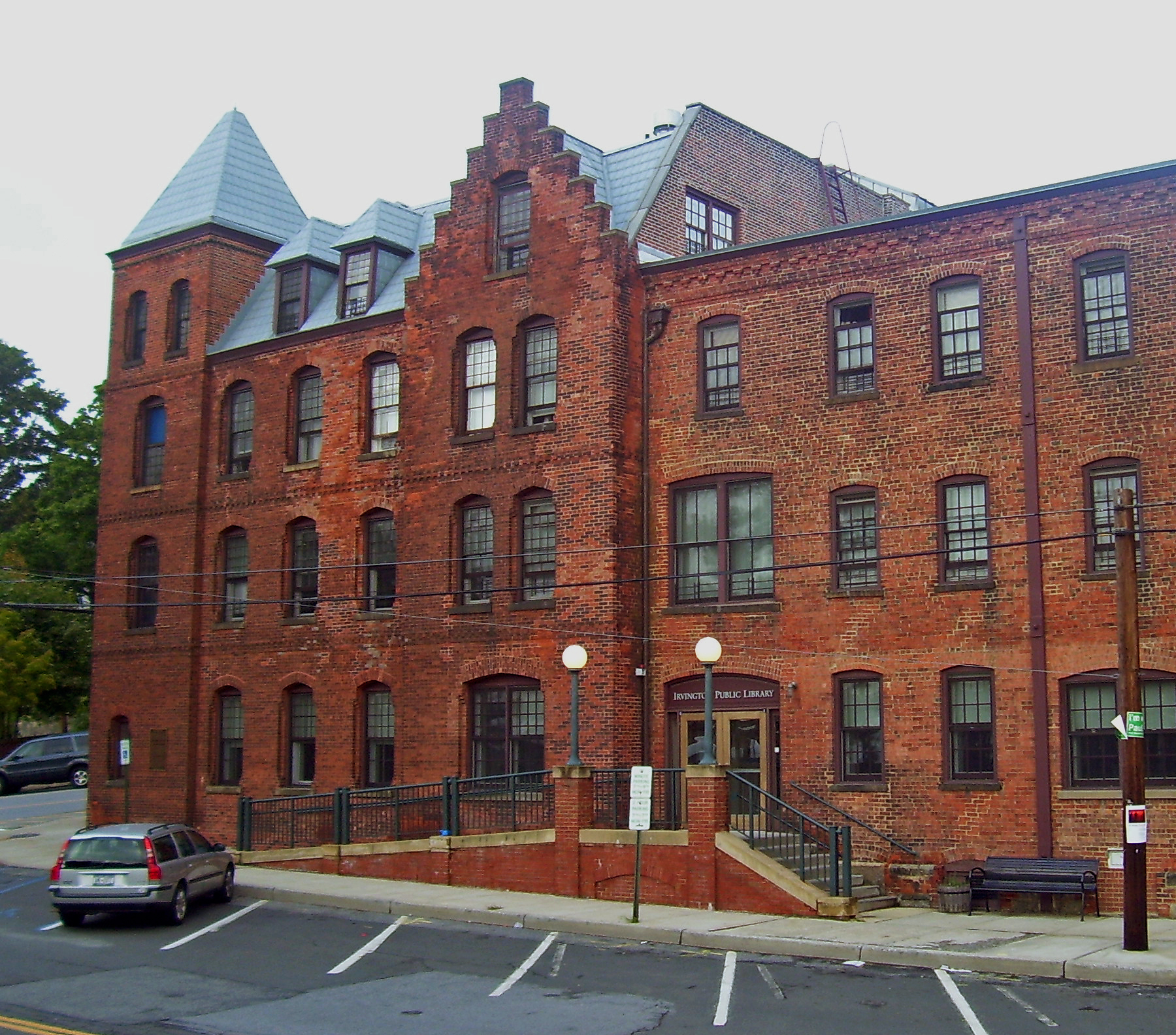
The building has now been converted into apartments, and a new home for the Irvington Public Library (2007)

== See also ==
- Sonnenberg Gardens and Mansion State Historic Park
