= Owls Head =

Owls Head or Owl's Head may refer to:

in Canada (by province)

- Owls Head, Halifax, Nova Scotia, a community in the Halifax Regional Municipality
- Owls Head, Lunenburg County, Nova Scotia, an island
- Mont Owl's Head, Quebec

in the United States (by state)

- Owl's Head Historic District, Des Moines, Iowa
- Owls Head, Maine, a town in Knox County on Penobscot Bay
  - Owls Head Light, at the entrance to Rockland Harbor
  - Owls Head Transportation Museum, a working museum located next to Knox County Regional Airport
- Owl's Head (Carroll, New Hampshire), a mountain in Coös County
- Owl's Head (Franconia, New Hampshire), a mountain in Grafton County
- Owls Head (Hebron, New Hampshire), a log cabin in Grafton County
- Owl's Head Park, Brooklyn, New York
  - Owl's Head Skatepark, also known as Millennium Skate Park
