= Third Avenue (Brooklyn) =

Avenue in Brooklyn, New York

Coordinates: 40.658°N 74.004°W

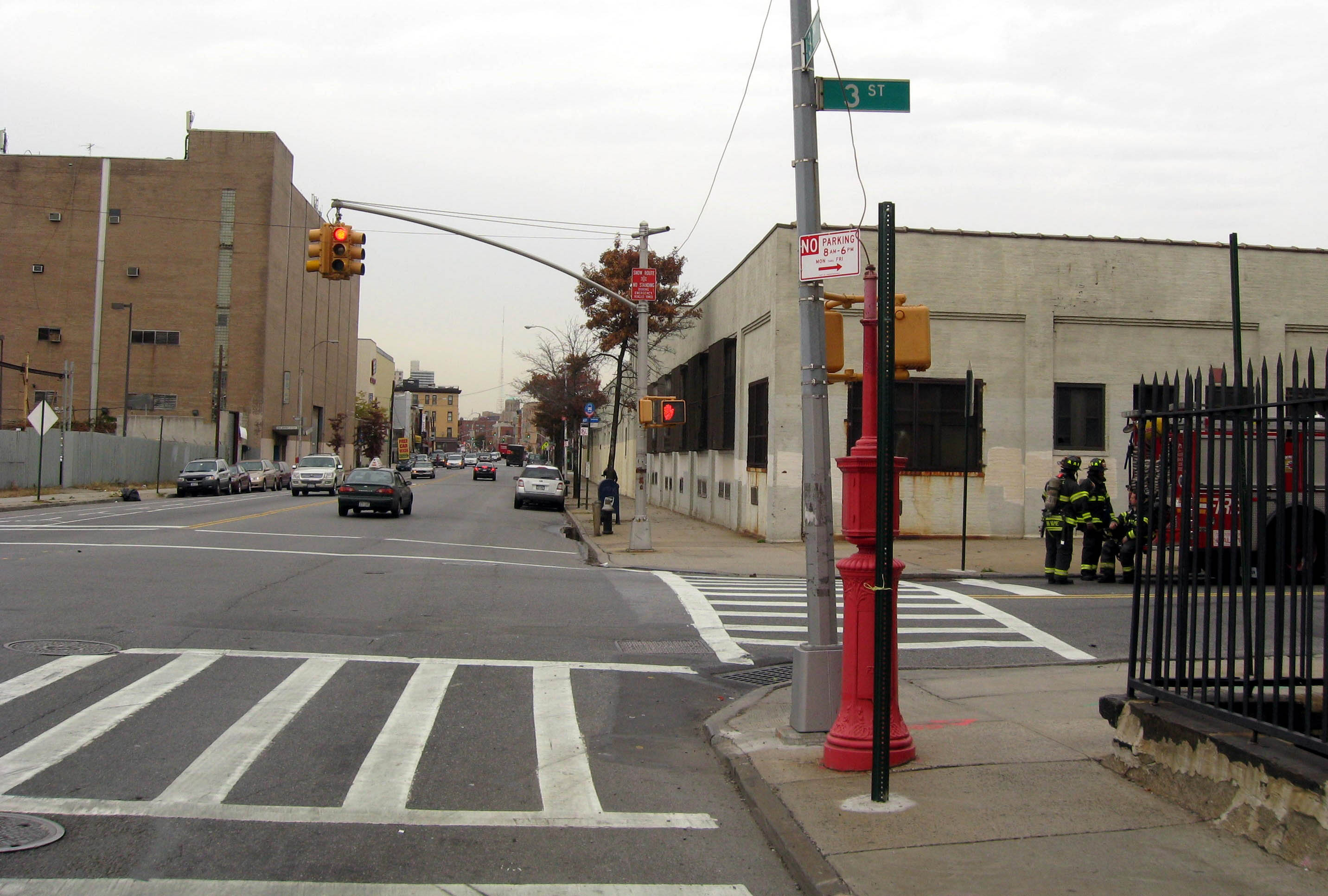
- Looking north from 3rd Street in Gowanus
- Interactive map of Third Avenue
- Owner: City of New York
- Maintained by: NYCDOT
- Length: 6.0 mi (9.7 km)
- Location: Brooklyn, New York City
- South end: Shore Road in Bay Ridge
- Major junctions: I-278 in Sunset Park and Greenwood Heights
- North end: Flatbush Avenue in Downtown Brooklyn

Third Avenue is a street in the New York City borough of Brooklyn. It runs parallel to Fourth Avenue for most of its length, and it also runs under the Gowanus Expressway from the Prospect Expressway to 65th Street. It has been mostly industrial for most of its existence, though the stretch of Third Avenue from Prospect Expressway to Downtown Brooklyn has recently undergone gentrification.

== Transportation ==
The following bus routes serve Third Avenue:

- The B37 serves the corridor south of Atlantic Avenue, with Bay Ridge service running from Bergen Street to Marine Avenue.
- The Downtown Brooklyn-bound B103 makes limited-stops on the corridor north of Prospect Avenue.
- The X27, X28, X37 and X38 run non-stop on the Gowanus Expressway while parallel to Third Avenue, with the X27/37 exiting the expressway to continue on Third until Bay Ridge Avenue. Manhattan service makes two stops at Senator and 65th Streets, and Bay Ridge service is absent from 65th to Wakeman Place, also running on another portion from Shore Road to Marine Avenue.
- The Crown Heights-bound B65 runs from Atlantic Avenue to Dean Street.
- The B70 runs between 39th Street and either 37th Street (Dyker Heights) or 36th Street (Sunset Park).
- The Bay Ridge-bound B16 and B63 run between Marine Avenue and Shore Road in opposite directions, with the B63 terminating at Shore.

The Third Avenue streetcar line formerly ran on Third Avenue from Fort Hamilton to the Brooklyn Bridge. The Fifth Avenue elevated line ran above Third Avenue in Sunset Park and Bay Ridge.

An extension of the Sunset Park Greenway on 3rd Avenue between Hamilton Avenue and 26th Street opened in 2026.

In October 2026, Mayor Zohran Mamdani announced a redesign of the avenue from 62nd Street to 20th Street, with increased pedestrian safety and protected bike lanes. There had been 17 traffic-related deaths in the past decade.

== Structures ==
Notable structures on Third Avenue include the Coignet Building and the Somers Brothers Tinware Factory, two New York City designated landmarks at the intersection with Third Street.
