= Coignet Stone Company Building =

Commercial building in Brooklyn, New York

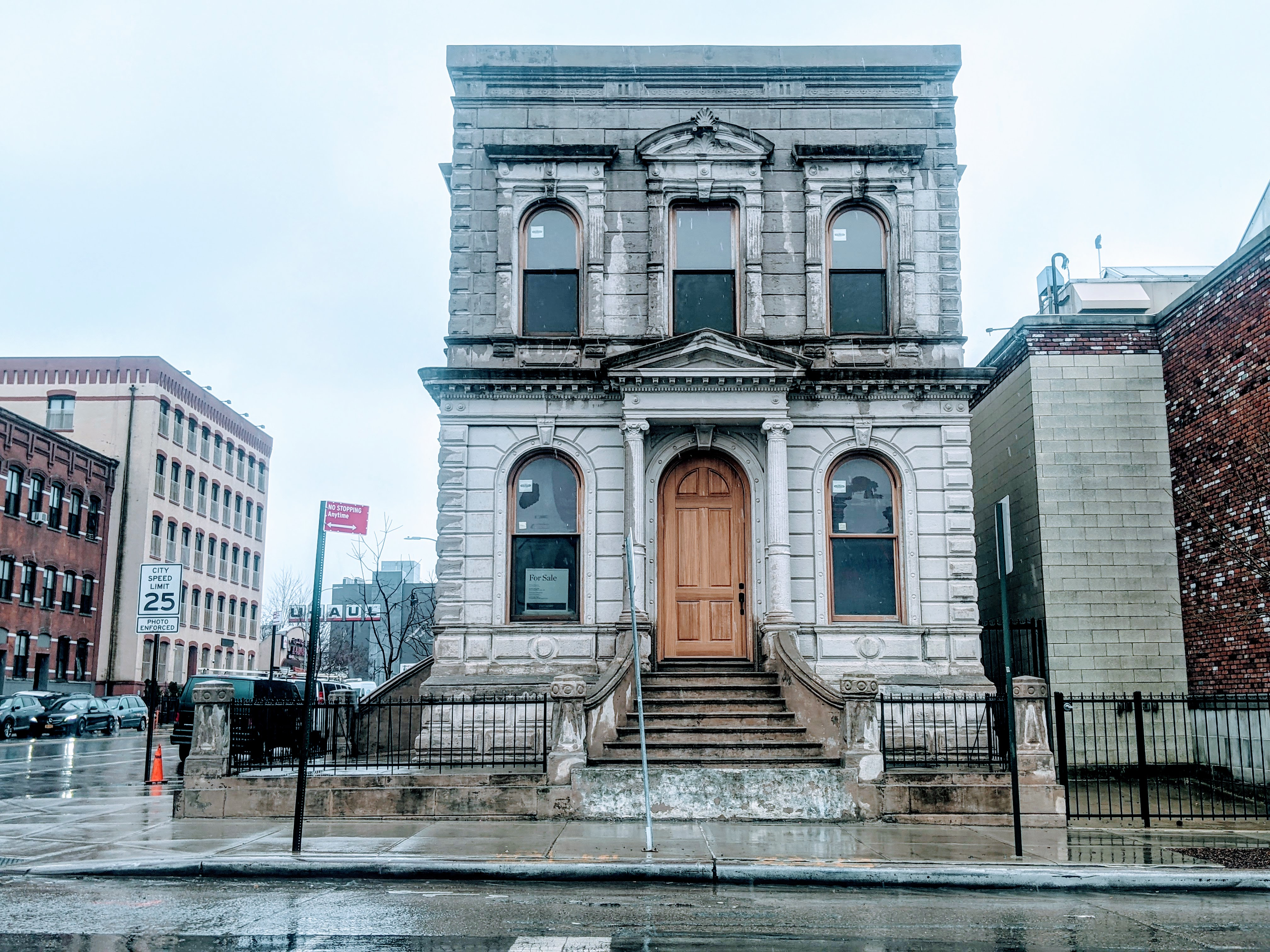
- Seen from Third Street
- Alternative names: Pippen Building

General information
- Location: Brooklyn, New York, US, 360–370 Third Avenue
- Coordinates: 40°40′30″N 73°59′18″W
- Construction started: 1872
- Completed: 1873

Technical details
- Floor count: 2

Design and construction
- Architects: William Field and Son
- Main contractor: D. B. & A. Rutan (mason); Riley Cocroft (stone setter); Henry Case (carpenter)

New York City Landmark
- Designated: June 27, 2006
- Reference no.: 2202

The Coignet Stone Company Building (also called the Pippen Building) is a historical structure in the Gowanus neighborhood of Brooklyn in New York City, United States, at the intersection of Third Street and Third Avenue. Designed by architects William Field and Son and constructed between 1872 and 1873, it is the city's oldest remaining concrete building. It is the last remaining structure of a five-acre concrete factory complex built for the Coignet Agglomerate Company along the Gowanus Canal.

The building has a two-story cast-stone facade above a raised basement. It was created with a type of concrete patented by Frenchman François Coignet in the 1850s and manufactured at the Gowanus factory. The Coignet Agglomerate Company, for which it was erected, was the first United States firm to manufacture Coignet stone.

Despite the popularity of Coignet stone at the time construction, the Coignet Agglomerate Company completely shuttered in 1882. It was subsequently used by the Brooklyn Improvement Company for seventy-five years until that company, too, closed in 1957. The facade was renovated in the 1960s, but the building behind it was left to deteriorate for the rest of the 20th century. After Whole Foods Market bought the surrounding factory complex in 2005, the building became a New York City designated landmark on June 27, 2006. In conjunction with the construction of the adjacent Whole Foods store, its exterior was restored between 2014 and 2016.

== Architecture ==
The Coignet Stone Company Building is at 360–370 Third Avenue and 230 Third Street, at the southwestern corner of their intersection, in the Gowanus neighborhood of Brooklyn in New York City, United States. The building's land lot has an area of about 1,718 square feet (159.6 m^{2}) and dimensions of approximately 34.5 by 49.8 feet (10.5 by 15.2 m). The site is on the eastern bank of the Gowanus Canal and was leased from the Brooklyn Improvement Company, which developed sites along the canal in the mid-19th century. The company's founder, Edwin Clark Litchfield, was rumored to have built a tunnel from the Coignet Building to his Litchfield Villa in what is now Prospect Park, about 0.7 miles (1.1 km) from the Coignet Building. A search in 2014 failed to uncover evidence of any such tunnel.

The building itself was constructed from 1872 to 1873 and designed by William Field and Son for the New York and Long Island Coignet Stone Company. (Note: According to Brooklyn Review, Frank H. Loenholt was most responsible for the design.) Contractors involved in the construction process included masons D. B. & A. Rutan; stone setter Riley Cocroft; and carpenter Henry Case. The Coignet Building measures 25 by 40 feet (7.6 by 12.2 m) with the longer frontage on Third Street. The building was designed not only as a company office but also as a showroom for the company's artificial stone products. It was constructed of Beton Coignet concrete, a precast stone material developed in the 1850s by Frenchman François Coignet. This material was manufactured by its original occupant, the Coignet Agglomerate Company, at its adjacent factory. Many of the building's innovations were introduced by Coignet Agglomerate Company vice president John C. Goodridge Jr., and the materials were sourced directly from the stoneworks.

Upon the building's completion, Brooklyn Society Magazine described the structure as "an ornament to the city", while The Brooklyn Daily Eagle called it a "very attractive" edifice in contrast to the surrounding wooden structures. Brooklyn Review said that, from a distance, the building's appearance was "almost irresistible".

=== Facade ===
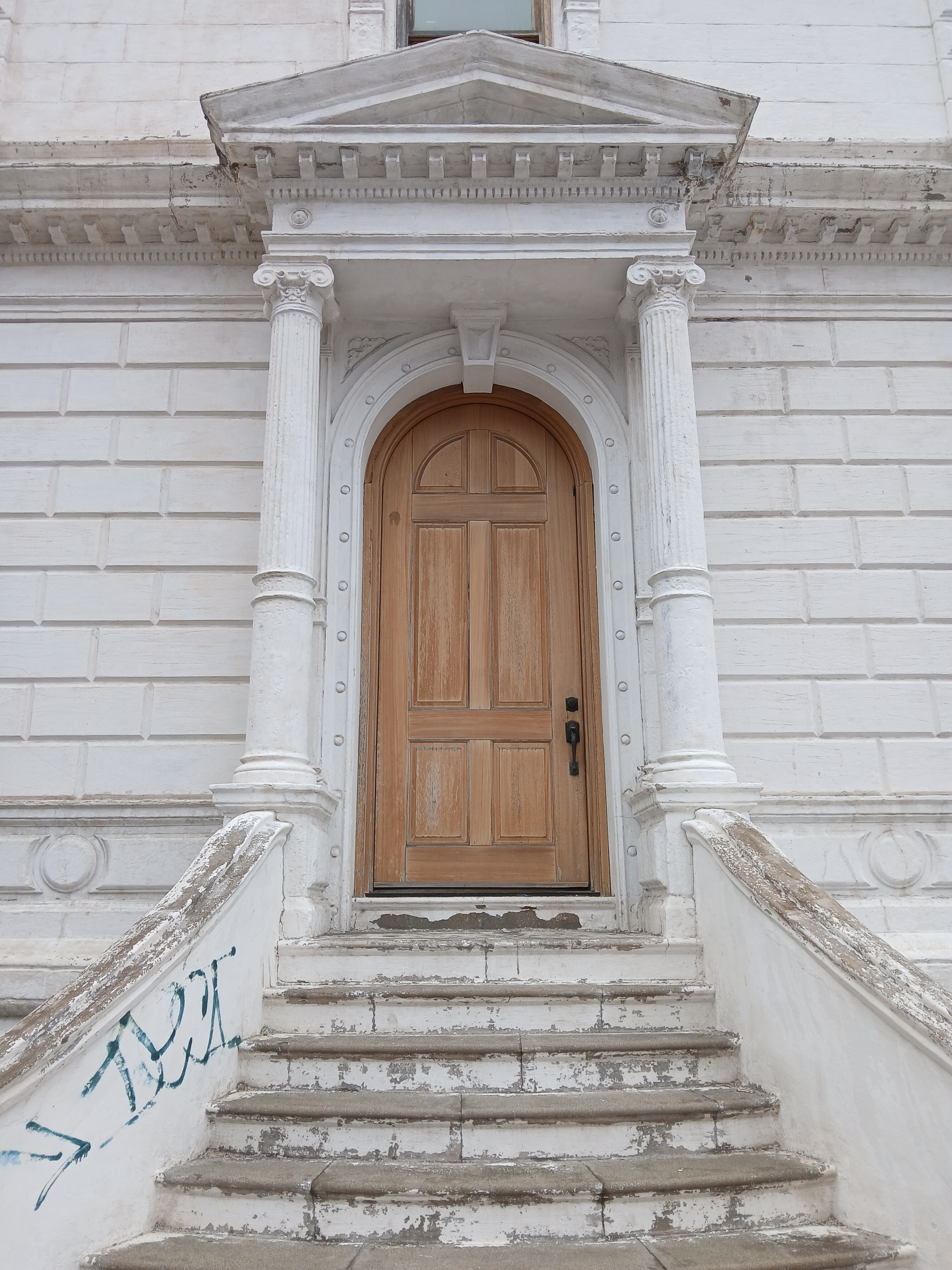
Doorway on Third Avenue

The Coignet Building was designed as a two-story structure with a raised basement. A parapet atop the facade made the building appear as being almost three stories high. Both the eastern elevation on Third Avenue and the northern elevation on Third Street are decorated. The basement is made of a continuous concrete structure and is wider than the upper stories to reduce settlement into the ground. The first and second stories are made of concrete blocks. According to an 1874 rendering, a low fence was to surround the lot, while the parapet was to be designed with carved urns and letters, but whether these features were built is not known.

On the eastern and northern elevations, the facade consists of three vertical bays. Horizontal entablatures run above both the first and second stories. On both Third Avenue and Third Street, the center bay contains a stoop with curved sidewalls, leading up to an entrance underneath an Ionic-style portico. The outer bays on the northern and eastern elevations are flanked by quoins. On the first story, the outer windows are composed of round-arched windows topped by ornate keystones. On the second story, all three windows on both sides are flanked by fluted vertical pilasters. The center window on either side is square-headed, with a curved pediment containing a central keystone, while the outer windows are round-arched, with decorative lintels atop them. According to the 1874 rendering, there were supposed to be decorative panels between the Third Avenue entrance and either of the outer bays, although it is unknown if that was built.

On the western elevation, there are four bays. The northernmost bay (closest to Third Street) contains arched window openings identical to those of the outer bays on Third Avenue and Third Street. The other three bays have simple wall surfaces, as well as arched windows on the first floor; only one has a second-floor arched window. On the southern elevation are two bays, both with arched windows, as well as a simple wall surface.

=== Features ===
The building was likely constructed with floor plates made of reinforced concrete. François Coignet had tested such a construction method to determine whether it would add to the aggregate's tensile strength. The first floor was originally used as the offices of the Coignet Agglomerate Company's superintendent and employees. The second story had a janitor's apartment and private offices. Inside there were examples of the company's inventory including statuary, panels, columns, pediments, and quoins.

The Fourth Street basin gave waterway access to the complex. The 100-foot-wide (30 m) wide basin, between Fourth and Fifth Streets extended from the Gowanus Canal to Third Avenue. It provided the Coignet Stoneworks with 1,600 feet of wharf frontage. According to The Brooklyn Daily Eagle, in the year after the factory's completion (July 1872 to July 1873), the basin received forty deliveries of sand, 2,500 short tons (2,200 long tons; 2,300 t) in "sundry materials", and 8,800 barrels of Portland cement, and the basin shipped 765 stone pieces.

== History ==
Formed in 1869, the Coignet Agglomerate Company was the first American firm to create artificial Coignet stone, a construction method already popular in Europe. Its officers, which included General Quincy Adams Gillmore, R. O. Glover, and John C. Goodridge Jr., went to France to observe stone manufacturing processes. The original factory was at Smith and Hamilton Streets in Carroll Gardens, Brooklyn, and produced artificial stones for facades, decoration, and building blocks. Because the Coignet Agglomerate Company was originally the only Coignet stone manufacturer in the United States, its products were in high demand. In 1871, The Brooklyn Daily Eagle reported that the company was considering expanding because there was so much demand; at the time, the company was able to manufacture the facade of a house in one day. By then, Goodridge was the company's vice president while Gillmore was superintending engineer.

=== Early history ===
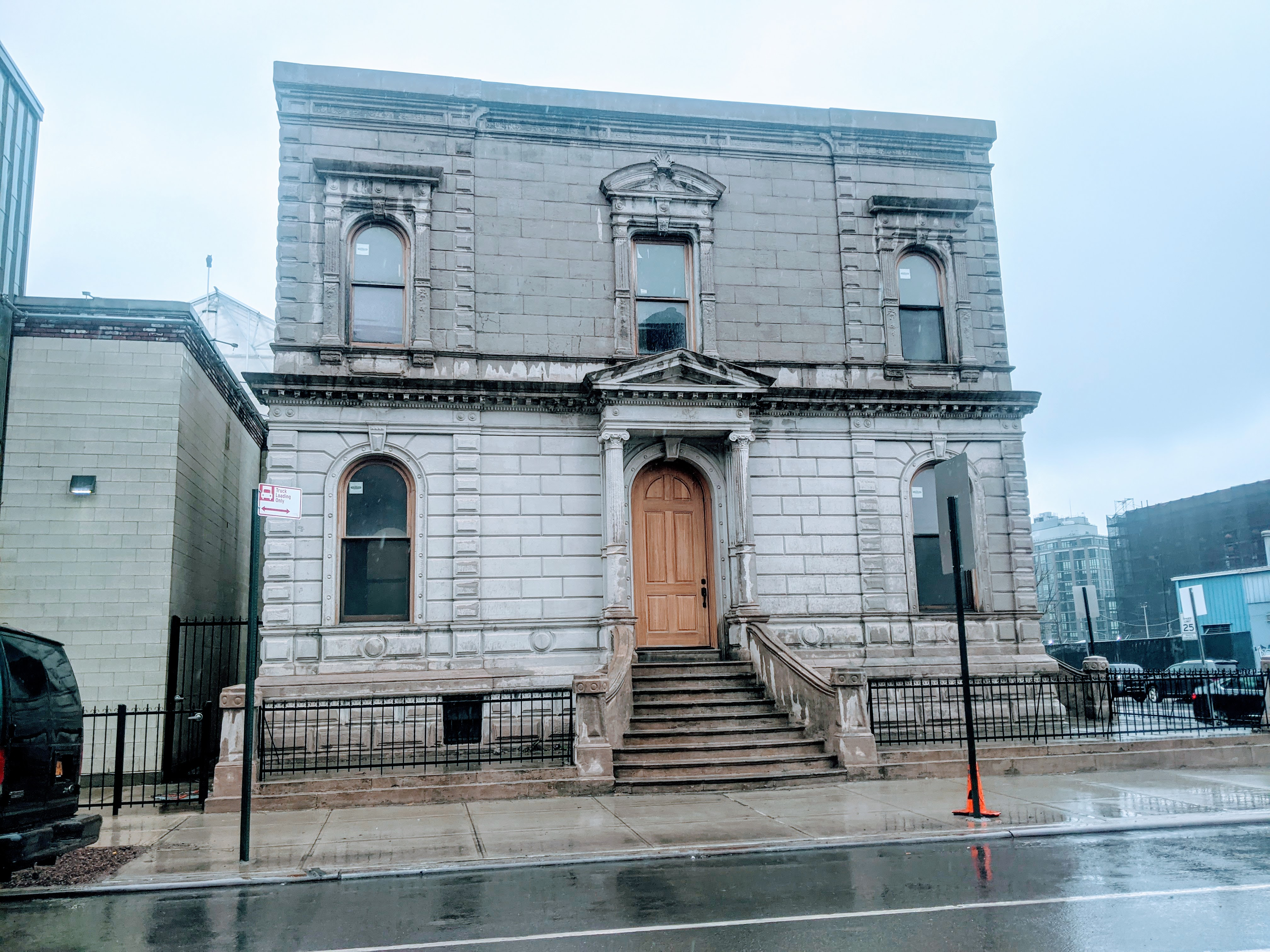
Third Avenue facade

In 1872, the Coignet Agglomerate Company acquired a five-acre site along Third Avenue between Third and Sixth Streets, facing the Fourth Street Basin of the then-new Gowanus Canal. On this site, the company erected a wooden factory, as well as a sales office at Third Avenue and Third Street. The Eagle reported in June 1872 that the nearly-complete factory covered 1 acre (0.40 ha), could employ 100 workers, and had enough resources to construct ten houses' facades each day. To advertise its business, the Coignet Agglomerate Company hosted an exhibit that October at an industrial fair sponsored by the city of Brooklyn.

The present Coignet Building, then the sales office and showroom adjoining the factory, was nearly completed by June 1873. At that point, the Coignet Agglomerate Company was conducting large amounts of business for churches and houses in Brooklyn and elsewhere. At its peak, the company was commissioned for several large projects, including the St. Patrick's Cathedral's arches and the Western Union Telegraph Building's floor slabs in Manhattan. The company also worked on the Cleft Ridge Span at nearby Prospect Park, and it was a supplier for buildings such as the Metropolitan Museum of Art and American Museum of Natural History in Manhattan and the Cemetery of the Evergreens' receiving tomb in Queens. Its high patronage prompted Edwin Litchfield to improve the Gowanus Canal as an industrial waterway.

Despite its large number of orders, in October 1873, the Coignet Agglomerate Company declared bankruptcy. The company then auctioned off its patents in April 1876. The next year, it reorganized as the New York Stone Contracting Company, of which Goodridge was president. It was under this company name that Goodridge submitted patents for a "Method of Repairing Structures with Beton or Concrete", as well as "Methods of Laying Out Concrete under Water". According to the New York City Landmarks Preservation Commission (LPC), it is likely the company performed fewer commissions, but that it might have also kept making decorative stonework. Much of the company's projects around the time were for structural elements for buildings in Upstate New York. Despite the reorganization, New York Stone Contracting closed in 1882.

=== Later industrial tenants ===
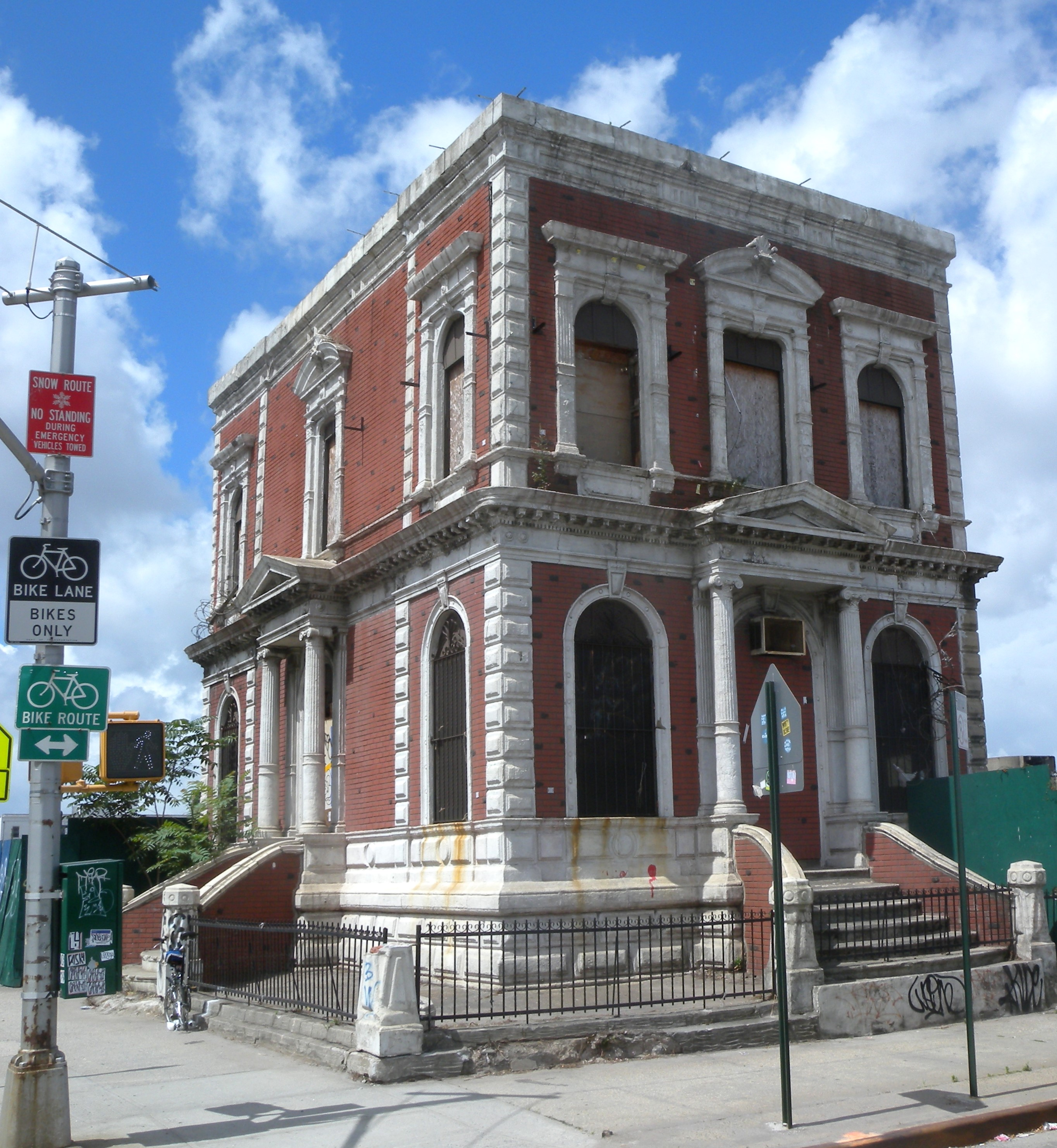
The building, in 2010 after the red brick cladding was installed

After New York Stone Contracting went defunct, the Brooklyn Improvement Company moved into the building. According to The New York Times, the Brooklyn Improvement Company Building did not appear on city maps until 1882. During the early 20th century, a "bagging works", a rope company, a coal yard, and the Pippin Radiator Company successively took up part of New York Stone Contracting's former factory.

The Coignet Building was effectively forgotten, according to the LPC. In their respective writings about the history of concrete, historians Carl Condit and Theodore H. M. Prudon mentioned the Coignet Agglomerate Company but not its building. Architectural writer Lewis Mumford, speaking of the structure in 1952, said the Brooklyn Improvement Company office stood "in ironic solitude – or should we say hopeful anticipation". Joseph K. Lane, who documented the Brooklyn Improvement Company's history, was the sole 20th-century commentator to recognize the building's significance, but even he recorded an inaccurate date in his writing. (Note: Lane wrote the building had been constructed "before 1860 when Edwin [Litchfield] purchased the property".) The Brooklyn Improvement Company sold off its properties by the mid-20th century and placed the onetime Coignet Building for sale in 1957.

When the Brooklyn Improvement Company moved out of the building, Pippin moved in. Locally, the structure became known informally as the Pippin Building. The exterior was renovated in the mid-1960s and refaced with imitation red brick. Coats of cement wash were applied to clean the decorative features. Several businesses subsequently occupied the Coignet Building but, by 1988, the city filed a lis pendens against the building's owner, who had died. It ended up abandoned by the 1990s. The Coignet Building was purchased in 1992 by Richard Kowalski, a Beach Haven, New Jersey, resident. According to city records, that year Levanic Inc. took possession of the building for $975,000.

=== Restoration ===
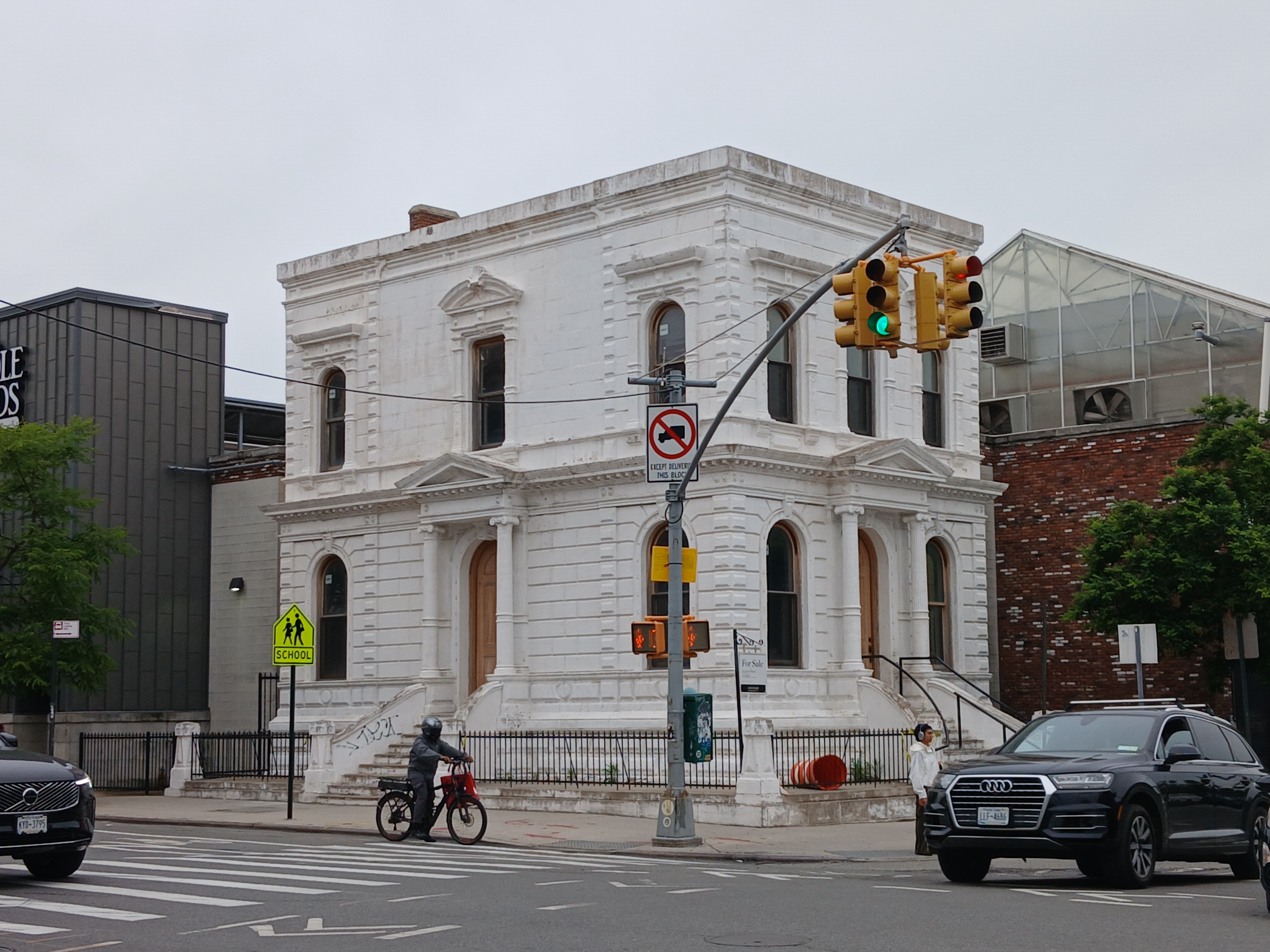
The Coignet Stone Company Building in 2026, surrounded by the Whole Foods store

The grocery chain Whole Foods Market bought the surrounding structures for $4,945,200 in 2005, in a deal in which it agreed to renovate the Coignet Building at an estimated cost of $1.3 million. Whole Foods agreed to buy the land surrounding the Coignet Building, but Kowalski would not sell the physical structure. The next year, on June 27, 2006, the LPC designated the Coignet Building as a city landmark. At the time, it was the oldest known example of ferro-concrete building construction still standing in New York City. A groundbreaking for the Whole Foods store, which was to replace much of the Coignet complex, occurred early that year. While the store and restoration were supposed to be completed in 2008, foundational work for the store had just begun that February. Work on the store stalled in 2008 and was ultimately abandoned in 2009. Complicating the project's development was the presence of toxins in the ground, which had to be cleaned before the store was built. The 2010 edition of the AIA Guide to New York City said the Coignet Building was "in need of immediate architectural CPR".

Plans for Whole Foods' store were revived in mid-2011, with the store to wrap around the Coignet Building. That year, the building's owner and Whole Foods made an agreement that restricted the possible usage of the landmark to certain commercial uses, namely offices, an auto supply shop, or an art gallery. As part of the revived plans, Whole Foods agreed to renovate the Coignet Building. The LPC granted a petition from Whole Foods to reduce the landmark Coignet structure's land lot from 6,250 to 1,925 square feet (580.6 to 178.8 m^{2}), despite opposition from preservationists, who objected that the store would be as close as 5 feet (1.5 m) from the landmark's facade. (Note: The Third Avenue frontage was shortened from 125 to 55 feet (38 to 17 m) and the Third Street frontage was shortened from 55 to 40 feet (17 to 12 m).) At the time, the facade was largely clad with false brick, while plywood boards had been placed over the window openings. In January 2013, Kowalski put the building for sale, with Massey Knakal as agent. Max Kutner published his documentary about the building's history, At the Corner of 3rd and 3rd, shortly afterward. Whole Foods declined to buy the Coignet Building.

During mid-2013, Whole Foods submitted plans to the New York City Department of Buildings to install new windows and doors, which the agency initially rejected. The Whole Foods store opened in December 2013. The month of the store's opening, the city government fined Whole Foods $3,000 for not having restored the Coignet Building on time. Residents and preservationists also alleged that construction of the store had caused portions of the base to crack. The fine was annulled because the city had not presented the necessary paperwork to court when issuing the fine. By that month, the Department of Buildings had approved new construction permits for the Coignet Building's restoration. As indicated by photographs published in early 2014, the interior had become dilapidated.

Work on the building's renovation commenced in March 2014. The same month, the city fined Whole Foods again for failing to maintain the building. During the renovation, the faux-stucco facade was removed, and a contractor repaired and rebuilt damaged portions of the historic cast stone. By late 2015, the roof had been restored and the windows and doors were being replaced. The Coignet exterior renovation was completed in early 2016. The same year, the New York Landmarks Conservancy recognized the restoration with its Lucy G. Moses Preservation Award for "excellence in restoration". However, the interior of the building remained unrestored. After the renovation the building was placed for sale by agent Cushman & Wakefield for $5 million; The listing drew no buyers. In August 2019, the Coignet Building was placed for sale again, this time for $6.5 million.

In September 2023, the building received a coat of white limewash, covering up the recently restored cast stone, and was on sale for $2.7 million. By 2025, the sellers were seeking nearly $3 million for the property.

== See also ==
- List of New York City Designated Landmarks in Brooklyn
- Smith-Ransome Japanese Bridge, another early reinforced-concrete structure
- William E. Ward House, another early reinforced-concrete structure
