= Litchfield Villa =

Historic house in Brooklyn, New York

- U.S. National Register of Historic Places
- New York State Register of Historic Places
- New York City Landmark
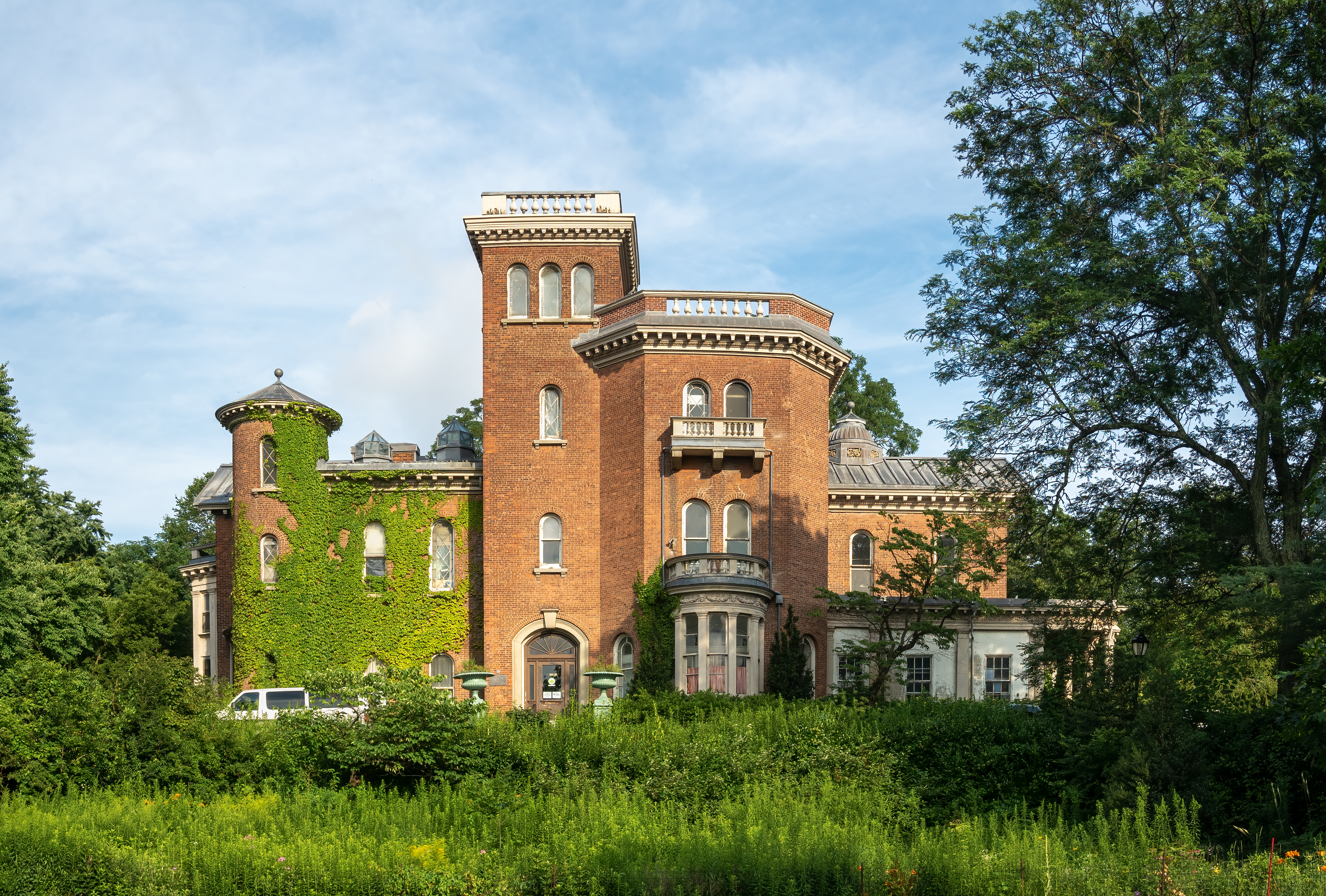
- West side

- Location within New York City
- Location: Prospect Park W. and 5th St. Brooklyn, New York City
- Coordinates: 40°40′1″N 73°58′26″W
- Built: 1854-1857
- Architect: A. J. Davis
- Architectural style: Italianate
- NRHP reference No.: 77000946
- NYSRHP No.: 04701.000017
- NYCL No.: 0153

Significant dates
- Added to NRHP: September 14, 1977
- Designated NYSRHP: June 23, 1980
- Designated NYCL: March 15, 1966

Litchfield Villa, or Grace Hill, is an Italianate mansion built in 1854–1857 on a large private estate now located in Prospect Park, Brooklyn, New York City. It is located on Prospect Park West at 5th Street. The villa was designed by Alexander Jackson Davis, America's leading architect of the fashionable Italianate style, for railroad and real estate developer Edwin Clark Litchfield.

== Description ==
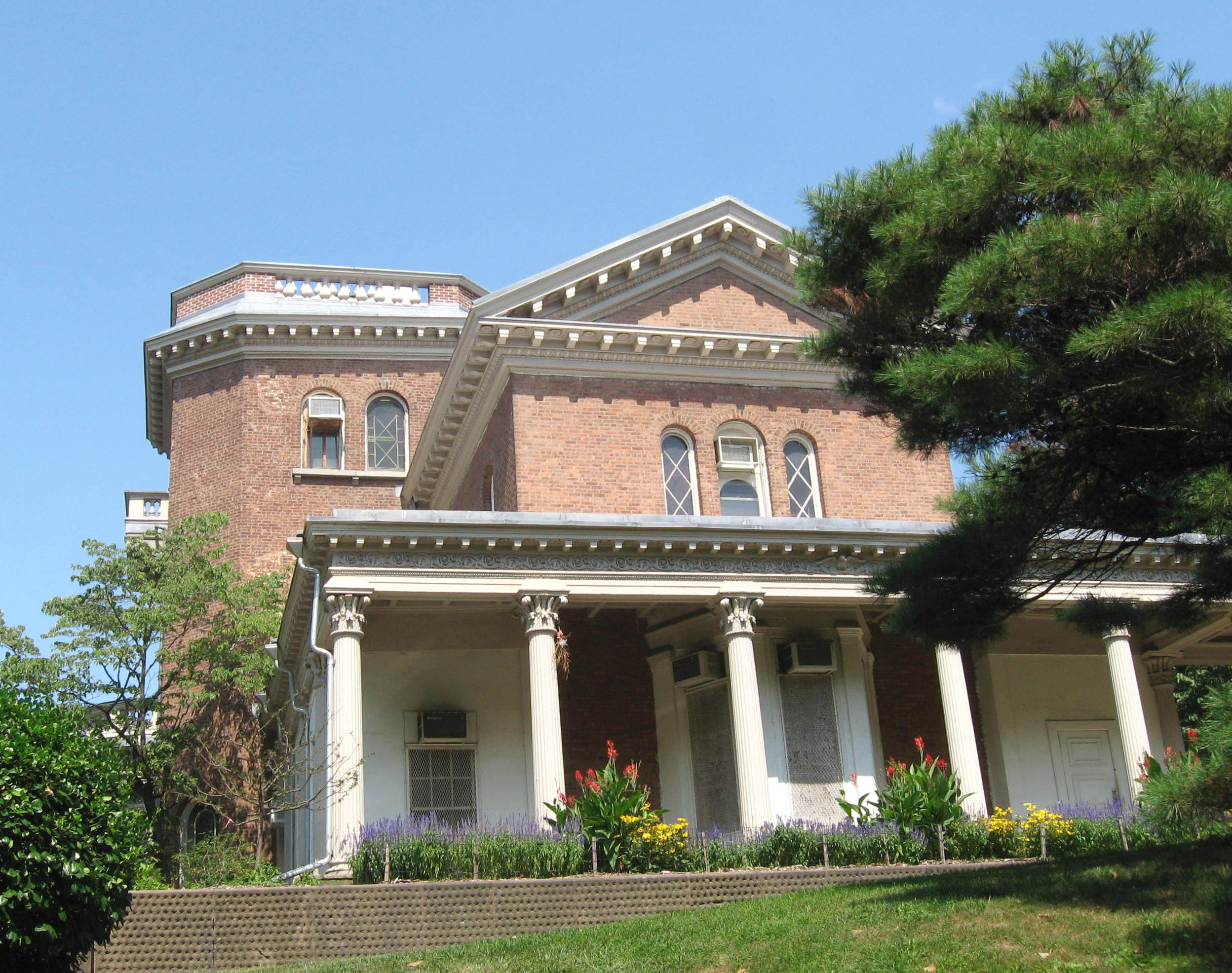
South side

The structure is considered to be Davis' greatest Italianate villa, and is currently the Brooklyn borough headquarters of the New York City Department of Parks and Recreation. Davis also designed a coach house, greenhouse, and chicken house for the property, none of which is extant. Davis created blueprints in several different styles, including the Gothic Revival and Italianate styles, before eventually selecting the Italianate blueprint.

The villa is located on raised ground behind a short stone retaining wall. The facade is made of brick that is painted to mimic stone. The front of the villa, facing west, contains a square four-story-high tower attached to an octagonal three-story pavilion. The first and third floors of the octagon contain curved bay windows with balconies. On the first floor, there are porches on the north and south sides of the villa, covered by canopies that are supported by columns of the classical order. A pair of cylindrical turrets adorn the north side of the building.

On the first floor inside the octagon, there is a rotunda that is lit by a skylight. A double staircase branches off the south end of the rotunda, rising to the second-floor, and an elaborately decorated drawing room on the first floor is located past the staircase. Past the rotunda and the drawing room there is a reception room that is also shaped like an octagon, and behind that is a dining room. The first floor also contains a circular library, a map room inside the western turret, and chambers for Edwin Clark Litchfield's wife Grace Hill Hubbard, who was reportedly partially disabled.

The second floor has balconies around the rotunda. A chamber above the first floor dining room contains a skylight and a ticket room. There are also servants' quarters on the villa's north end. On the third floor, there are a chapel and a billiard room, and on the fourth floor, there is a roof terrace.

There was a kitchen and storage rooms in the basement.

== History ==
Map of notable buildings and structures at Prospect Park (note: not all entrances shown). Click on points for more details.

Litchfield purchased the land in 1852, and the structure was built in 1854–1857 at a cost of $150,000 ($5.38 million in 2025). It predates the construction of Prospect Park, which opened in 1867. The original plans for the park called for it to be built around Litchfield Villa, since Litchfield was loath to sell his property. The New York City Parks Commission ultimately acquired the Litchfield plot in 1868 for $1.7 million ($41.1 million in 2025), representing 42% of the overall land expenditure for the park, even though the plot constituted just over five percent of the park's acreage.

The Litchfields leased the property from the city until 1882, and the following year, the Brooklyn Park Commission started using the house as its headquarters. Subsequently, Frank J. Helmle designed an annex at the back in 1911–1913.

The villa was listed on the National Register of Historic Places in 1977.

After years of neglect, an extensive renovation was funded by an anonymous descendant of the Litchfield family. The renovation, under the direction of architect Ralph Carmosino, was completed in 2008. The original stucco was removed from the house, and many of the interior details, including the elaborately painted ceiling murals, were lost.

== See also ==
- List of New York City Landmarks
- National Register of Historic Places listings in Kings County, New York
- New York and Long Island Coignet Stone Company Building
