= Millennium Skate Park =

Skatepark in Brooklyn, New York

- Owl's Head Skate Park
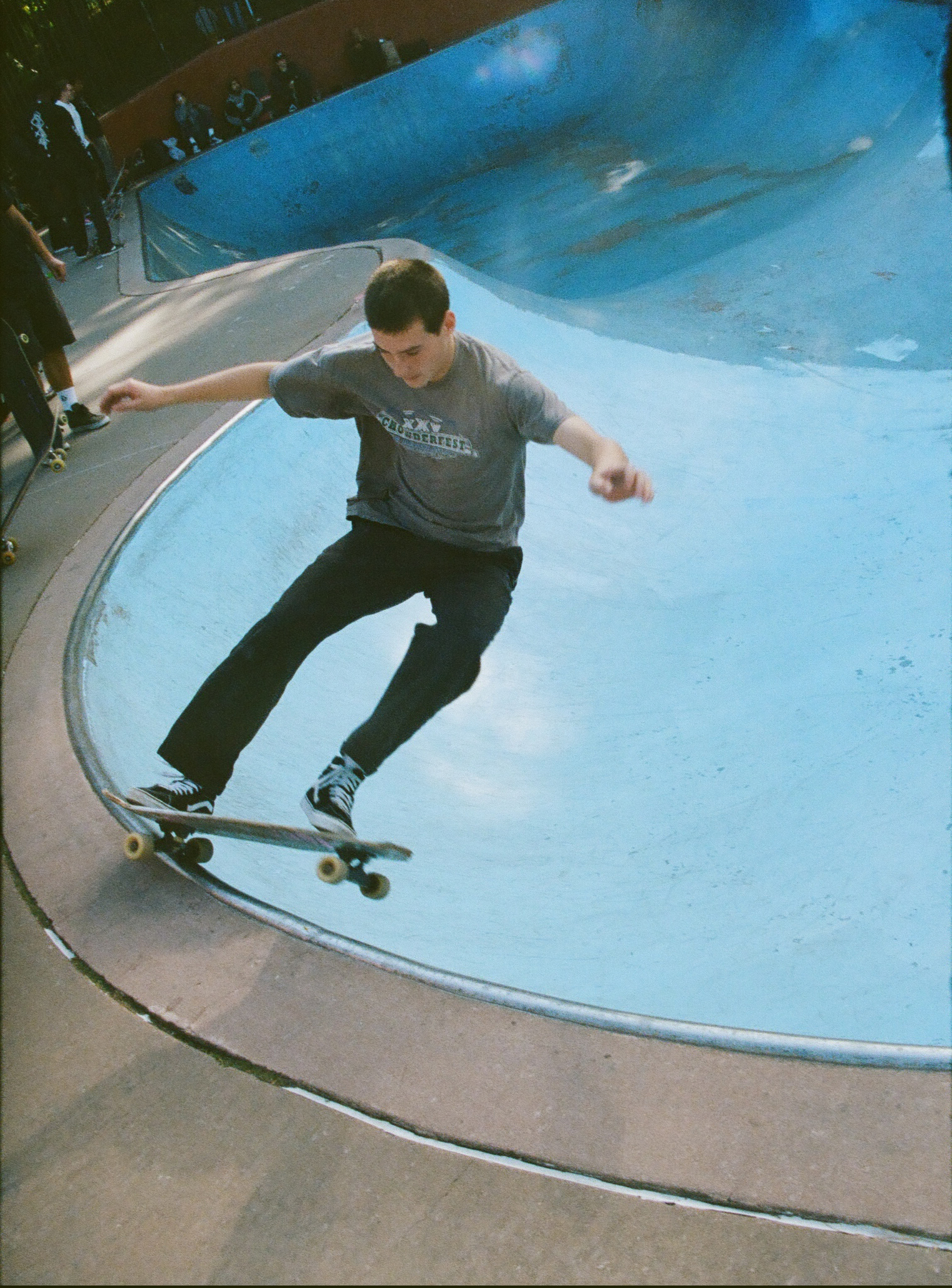
- Interactive map of Millennium Skate Park
- Type: Skate park
- Location: Bay Ridge, Brooklyn
- Coordinates: 40.640350°N 74.030685°W
- Area: 14,000 Sq Ft
- Created: New York City Department of Parks and Recreation
- Established: 2001
- Open: All year
- Terrain: Concrete

Millennium Skate Park, also known as Owl's Head Skate Park, is a skate park in Bay Ridge, Brooklyn, located in Owl's Head Park, adjacent to the Sunset Park Greenway.

== History ==
The park opened in 2001, designed by pro-skater Andy Kessler, it was the first concrete skatepark built in Brooklyn. The skate park was funded entirely by City Council Member Marty Golden and implemented by the NYC Parks' Capital Projects Division. Golden worked with Julius Spiegel, Martin Maher, and Laurence Major, Jr. to find a location in the park and bring it to fruition. The city worked with the skateboarding community to design the park. Owl's Head was the first concrete skatepark in New York City built by the Parks Department through the capital process.

This park is 14,000 square feet of skate park area, including both a street section and bowl section. One of the bowls at Millennium Skate Park is eight feet deep. In 2017, the New York City parks department repaired parts of the skatepark.

=== Events ===
In 2018, Andy Kessler Day was held at Millennium skate park. Since it was built, skaters have held many skate jams at the park. The NYC Skateboard Coalition hosts a yearly pool series event at the park.

== Gallery of photos from Millennium Skate Park ==
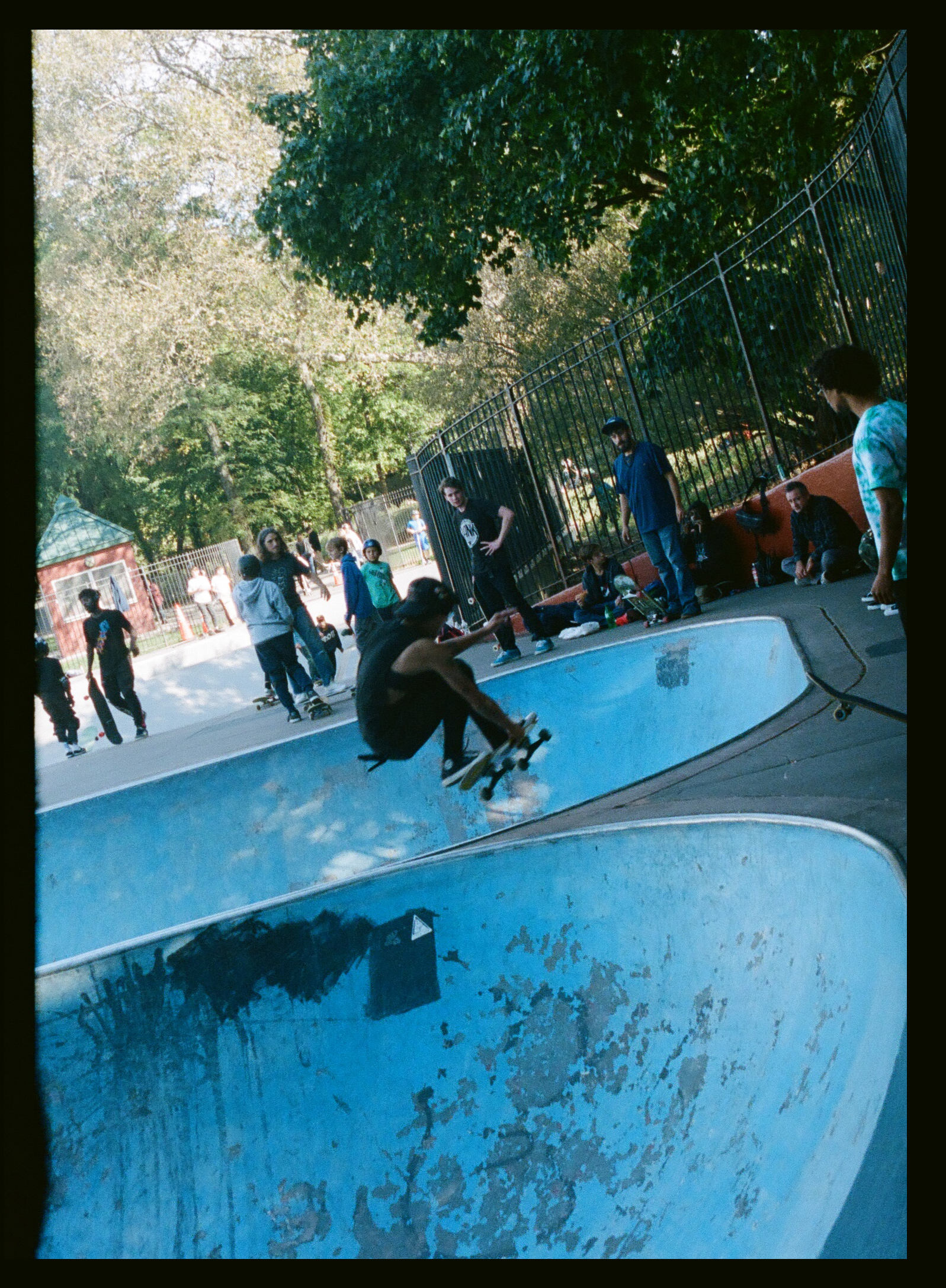

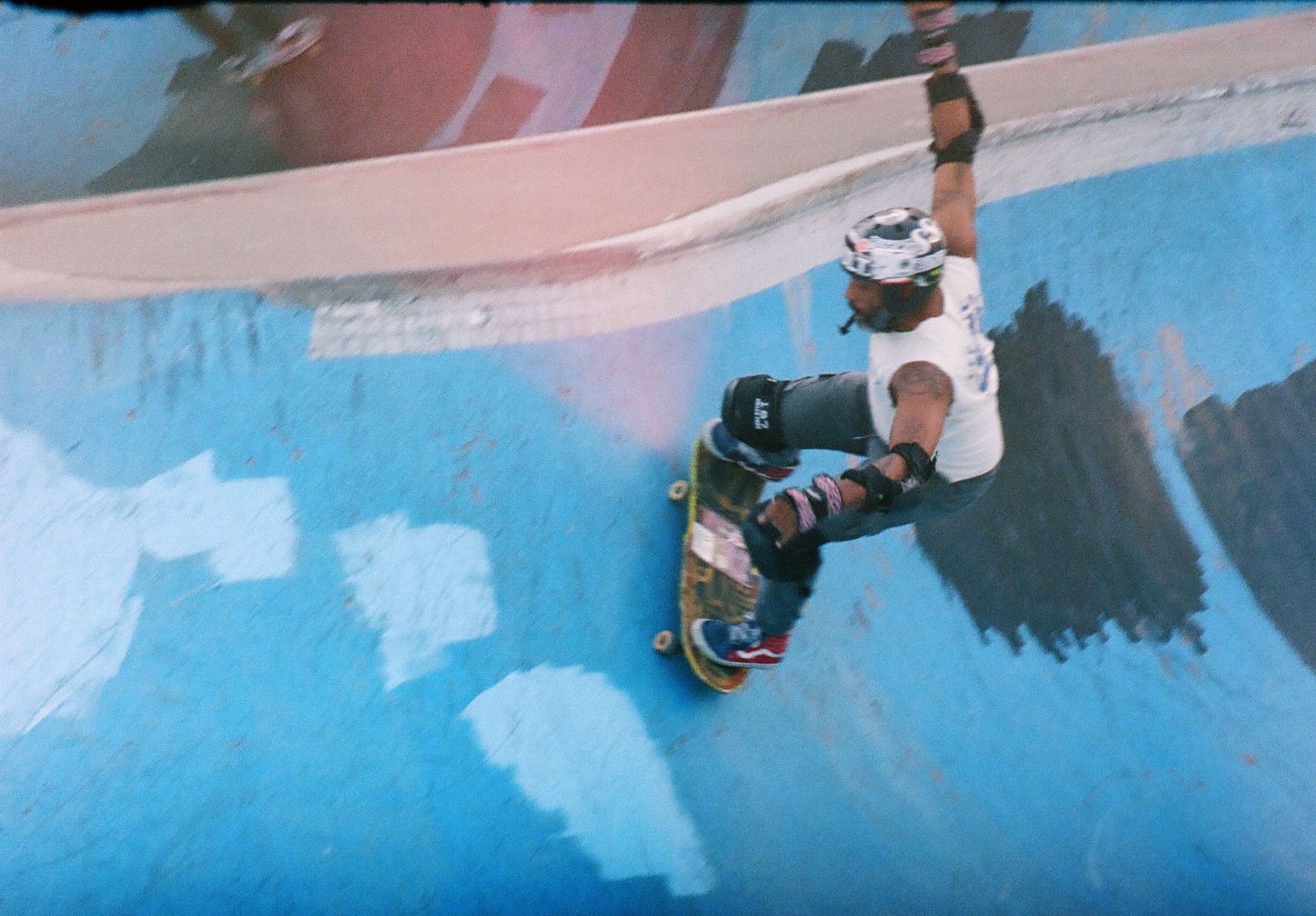

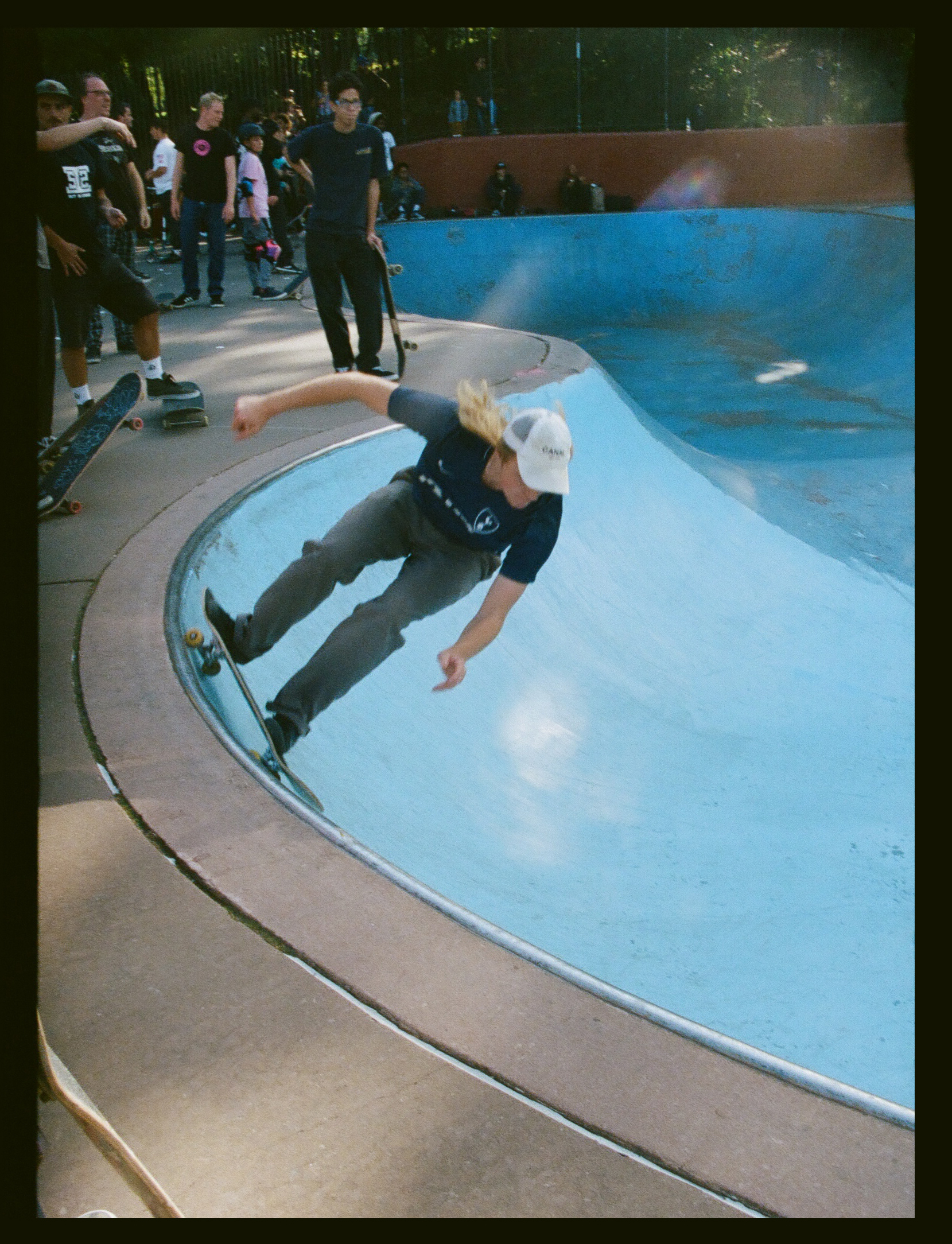

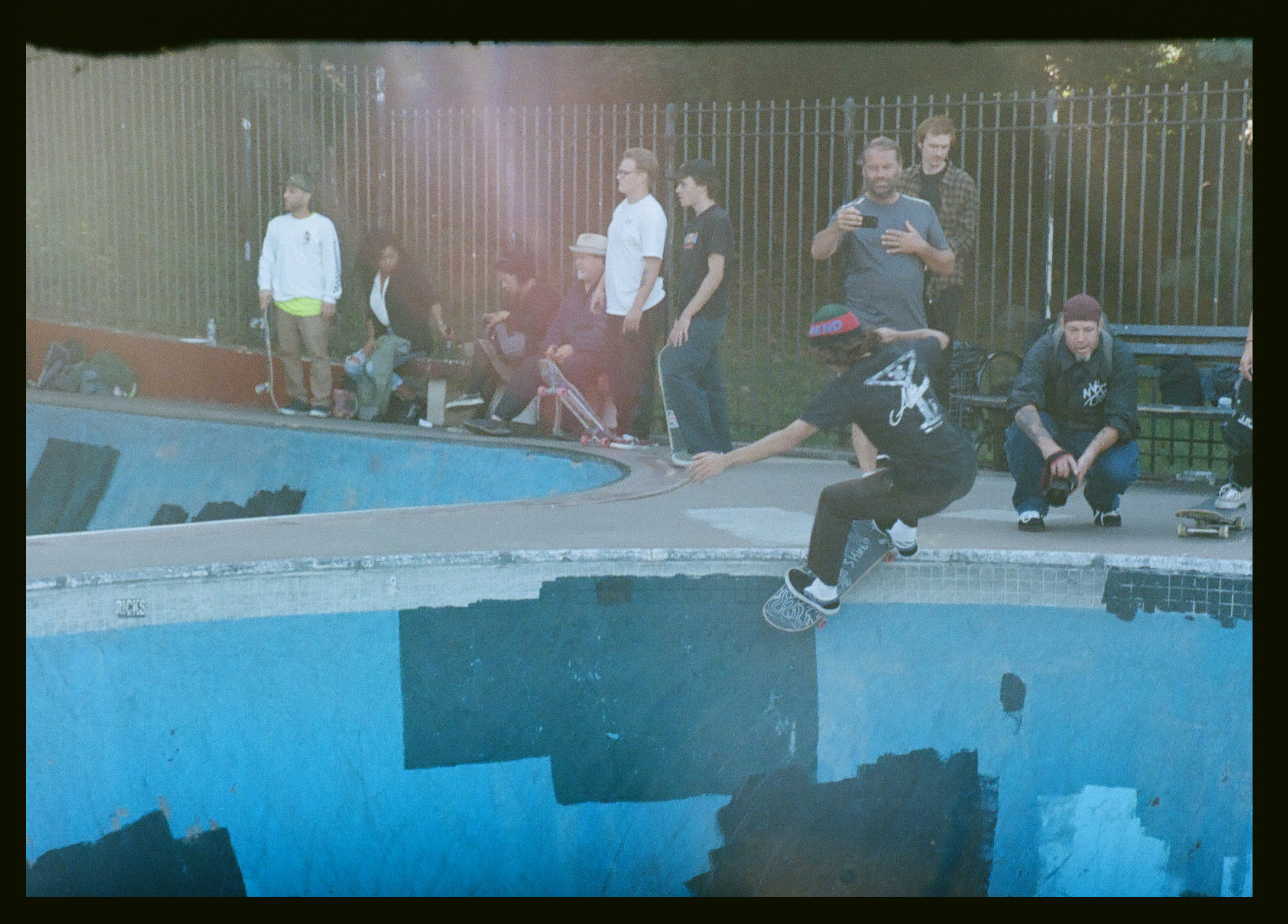

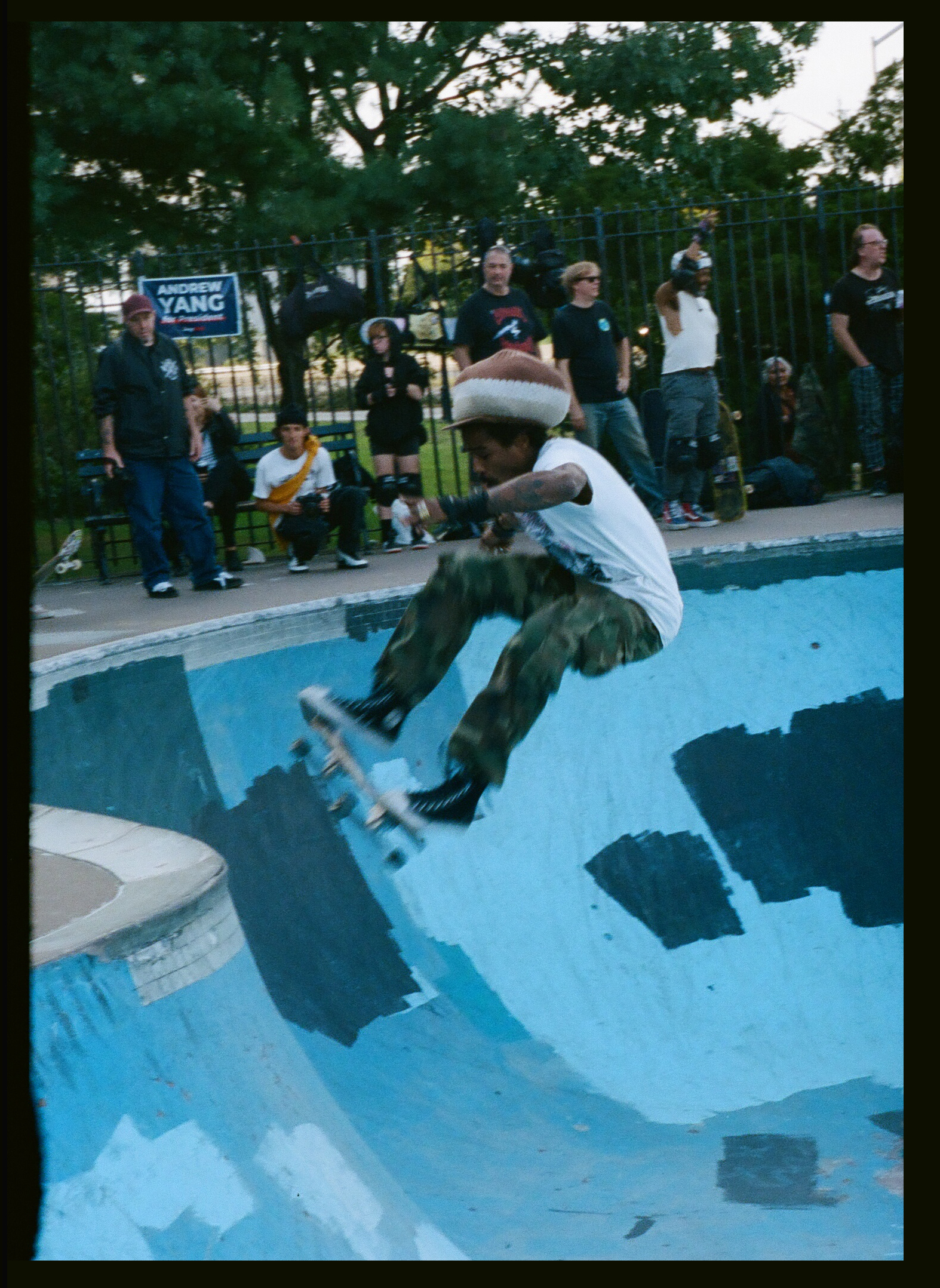

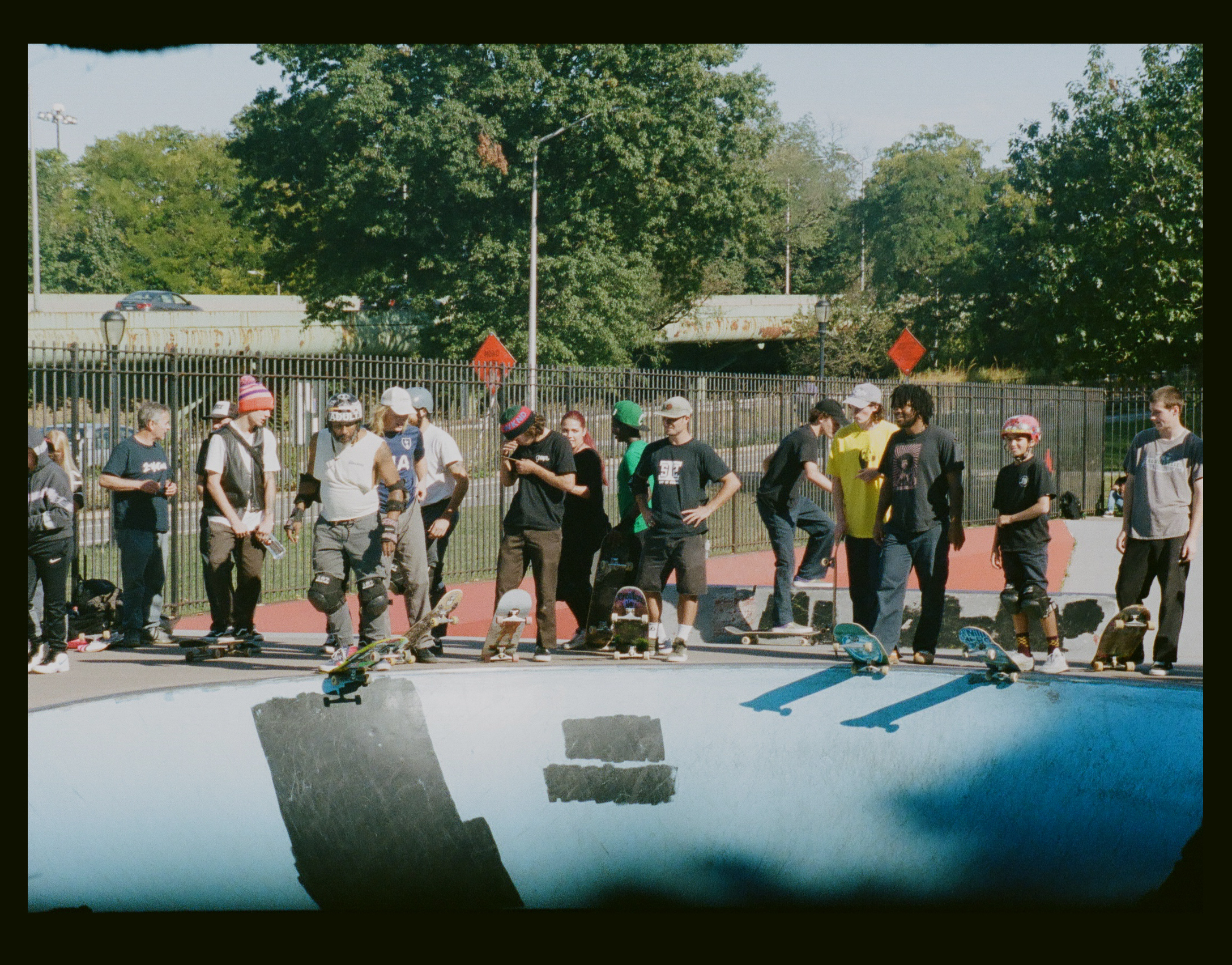

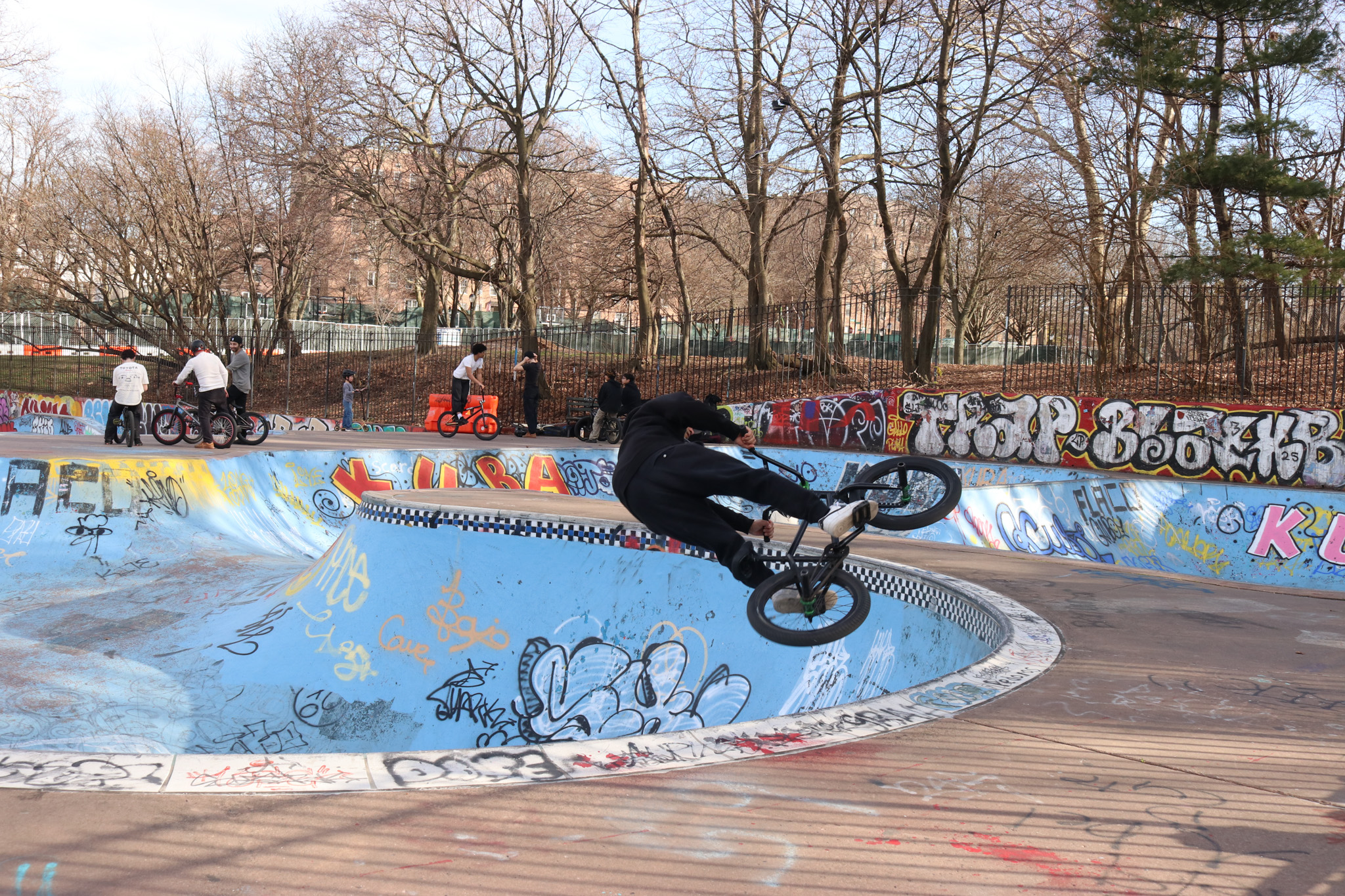
