= Owl's Head Historic District =

Historic district in Iowa, United States

- U.S. National Register of Historic Places
- U.S. Historic district
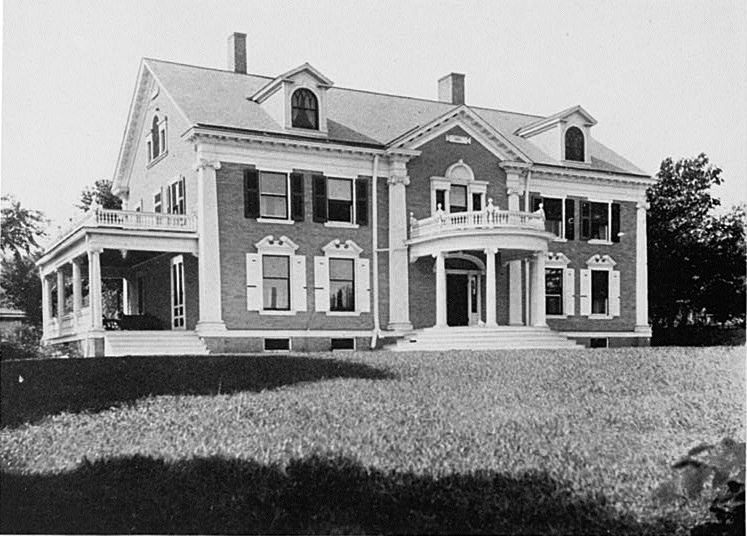
- Former Iowa Governor's Mansion

- Location within Iowa Location within the United States
- Location: Ridge Rd., Forest Dr. and 28th and 29th Sts. Des Moines, Iowa
- Coordinates: 41°34′57″N 93°39′18″W
- Area: 26 acres (11 ha)
- Architectural style: Colonial Revival; Late Victorian
- NRHP reference No.: 78001253
- Added to NRHP: October 11, 1978

The Owl's Head Historic District is a residential area located on the west side of Des Moines, Iowa, United States. Among its 50 buildings is the former Iowa governor's mansion. The district has been listed on the National Register of Historic Places since 1978.

== History ==
Owl's Head was platted in 1888 when the area was part of the town of Greenwood Park. It was annexed by the city of Des Moines in 1890. At the time the subdivision was being developed the city's railways system was being consolidated, expanded, and electrified. One line ran a block north of Owl's Head on Ingersoll Avenue. This and other factors made Owl's Head a street car suburb. The other factors included the homogeneity of social class and income, the relatively homogeneous structures and the woody lots. The shingling and half-timber work in the architecture also suggests an attempt to flee the city, at least psychologically, into a rural ideal.

== Architecture ==
Five of Des Moines’ more prominent architectural firms contributed structures to the district: Liebbe, Nourse & Rasmussen, Proudfoot, Bird and Rawson, Sawyer and Watrous, Kraetsch and Kraetsch, and C.C. Cross. While a variety of styles exist in the district there are certain generalizations that can be made about the structures. The houses are fairly large and are two to three stories tall. They appear larger as they are situated on fairly small lots, which is consistent with areas near the streetcar lines. The roof ridge is generally parallel to the front of the house. Gables and dormers are prominent architectural features. The houses also tend to have a combination of more than one exterior surface material such as brick and stucco, clapboard and shingling or brick and shingling. A large percentage of the houses in the district were built in a rather narrow time span between 1905 and 1915. The styles employed are generally historicist in detail and contemporary in mass and scale.

== Former Iowa Governor’s Mansion ==
The house at 2900 Grand Avenue served as the Iowa governor's mansion from 1944 to 1976. It was built in 1905 for W.W. Witmer. The house was designed in the Palladian Georgian Revival style. The brick structure features a five-bay front with a central Palladian window on the second floor. A central pavilion that is framed by fluted Ionic pilasters protrudes from the house. Pilasters also adorn the corners of the main block and a full entablature is returned over the pilasters and defines the pavilion. A gabled dormer is centered over each side bay. The windows have a "Gothick" character and the first-floor windows feature Swan's-neck pediments. The interior follows a central hall design. After it served as the governor's mansion the house became office space for the Iowa Girls' High School Athletic Union.
