= Owls Head Light =

Lighthouse in Maine, US

Owls Head Light Owls Head Light
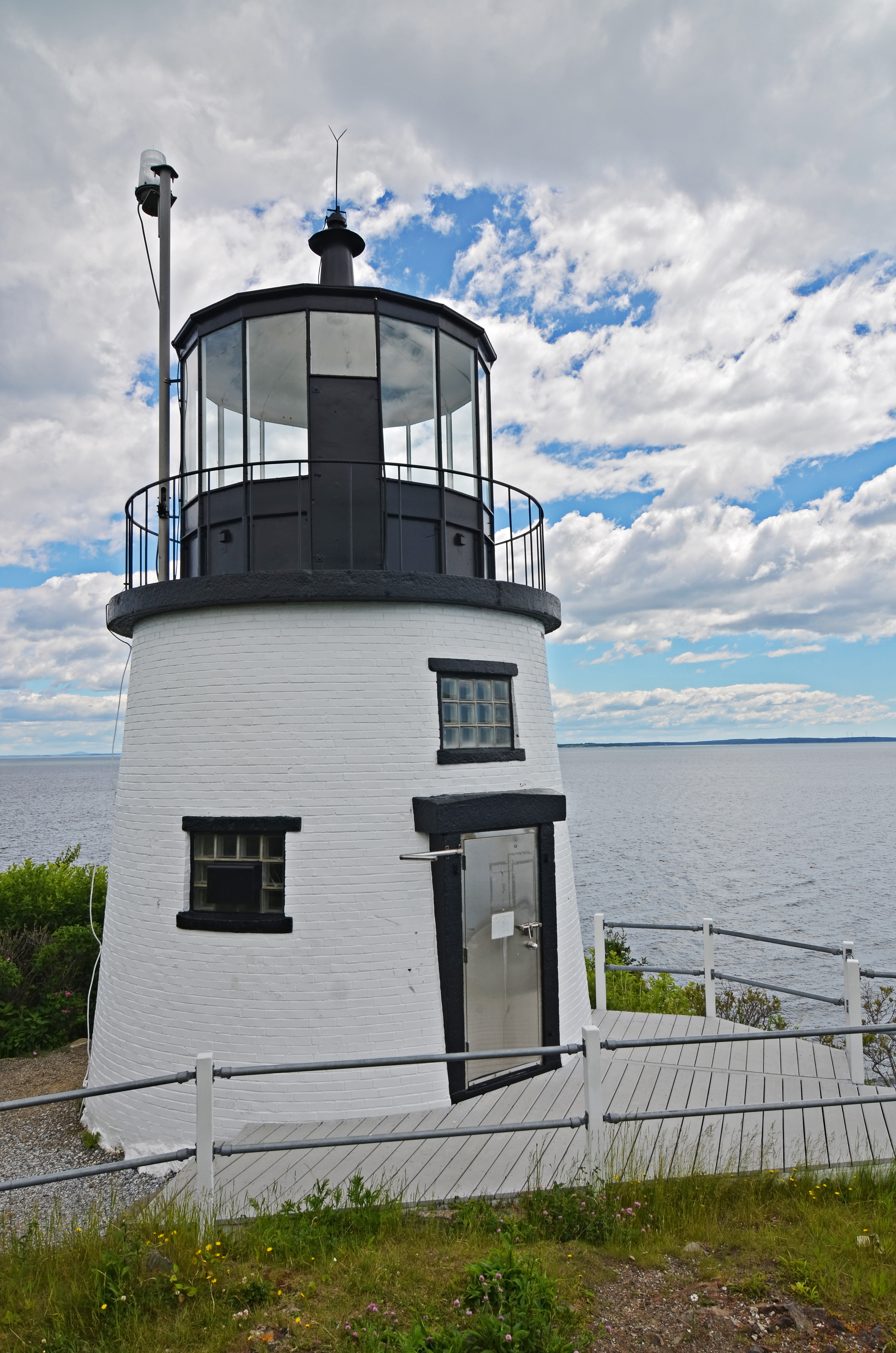
- Location: Owls Head, Maine
- Coordinates: 44°05′30″N 69°02′38″W

Tower
- Constructed: 1825
- Foundation: Granite
- Construction: Brick
- Automated: 1989
- Height: 9 m (30 ft)
- Shape: Cylindrical
- Markings: White with black lantern
- Heritage: National Register of Historic Places listed place
- Fog signal: Horn: 2 every 20s

Light
- First lit: 1825
- Focal height: 100 feet (30 m)
- Lens: 4th order Fresnel lens
- Range: 16 nautical miles (30 km; 18 mi)
- Characteristic: Fixed white
- Owls Head Light Station
- U.S. National Register of Historic Places
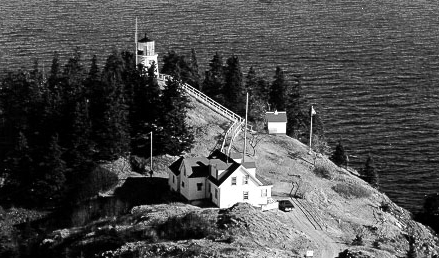
- Nearest city: Owls Head, Maine
- Area: 3 acres (1.2 ha)
- Built by: Jeremiah Berry; Green & Foster
- NRHP reference No.: 78000183
- Added to NRHP: January 18, 1978

The Owls Head Light is an active aid to navigation located at the entrance of Rockland Harbor on western Penobscot Bay in the town of Owls Head, Knox County, Maine. The lighthouse is owned by the U.S. Coast Guard and licensed to the American Lighthouse Foundation. It is the centerpiece of 13-acre (5.3 ha) Owls Head State Park and was added to the National Register of Historic Places as Owls Head Light Station in 1978.

== History ==
The town of Owls Head is located south of Rockland, and includes an eponymous peninsula that projects northeast into Penobscot Bay, with its tip roughly east of downtown Rockland. The light station is located at the eastern tip of this peninsula. The light station was established in 1825 with the construction of a round, rubblestone tower by Jeremiah Berry and Green & Foster. The tower was rebuilt in 1852. It is a 30-foot-tall (9.1 m) cylindrical brick tower on a granite foundation standing on top a cliff. It has one of the last six Fresnel lenses in operation in Maine. The light is located 100 feet (30 m) above mean sea level.

In 1854, a keeper's house was built separately from the lighthouse. The cottage now serves as the headquarters of the American Lighthouse Foundation. A fourth order Fresnel lens was installed in 1856. A generator house and an oil storage building were added in 1895.

Renovations carried out in 2010 saw the tower restored to its 1852 appearance. In addition to repainting the tower, repairs were done to the bricks, the lantern's ironwork and windowpanes, and the parapet's floor.

== Gallery ==
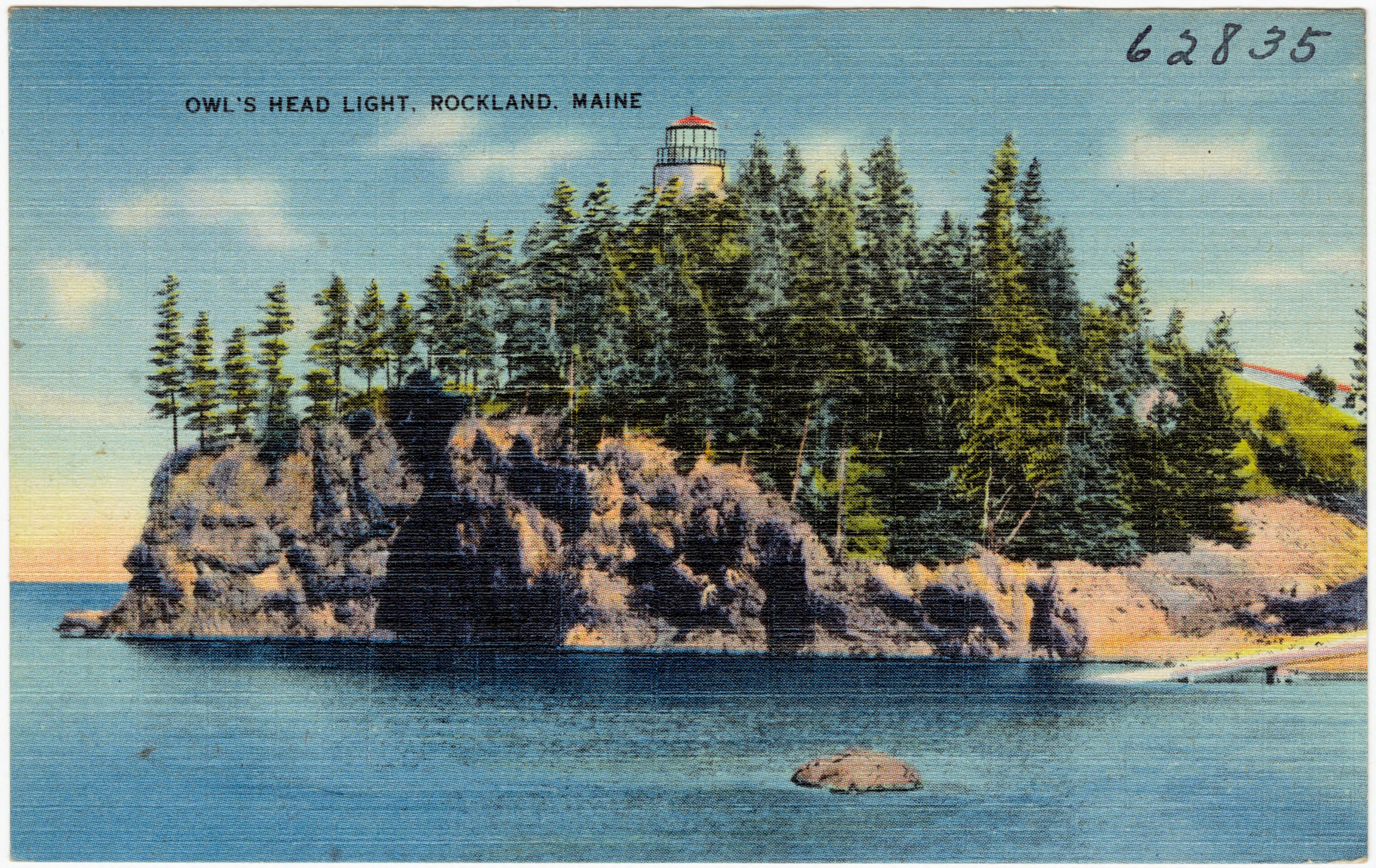
Postcard view c. 1930s

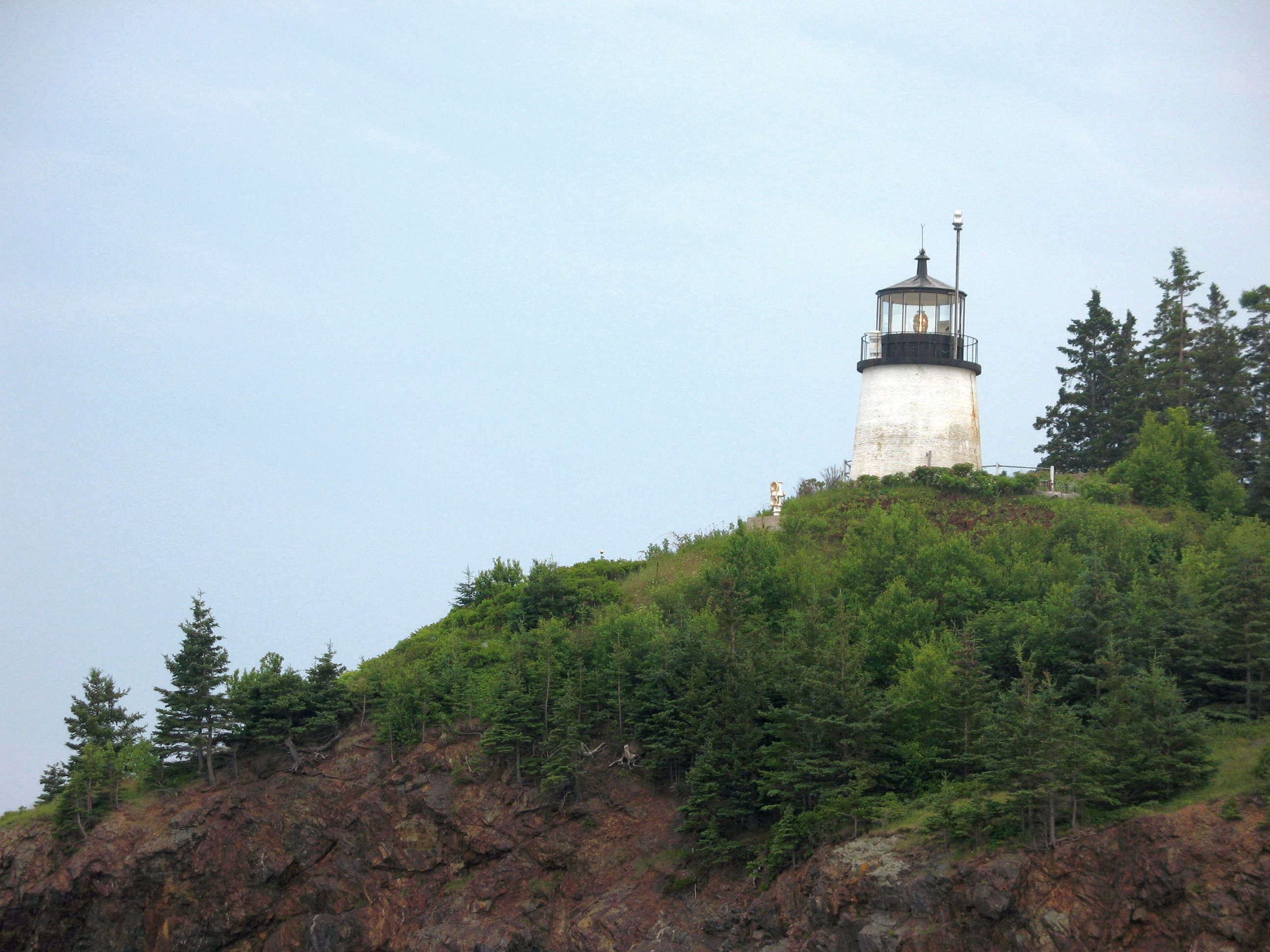
The hill where the tower sits

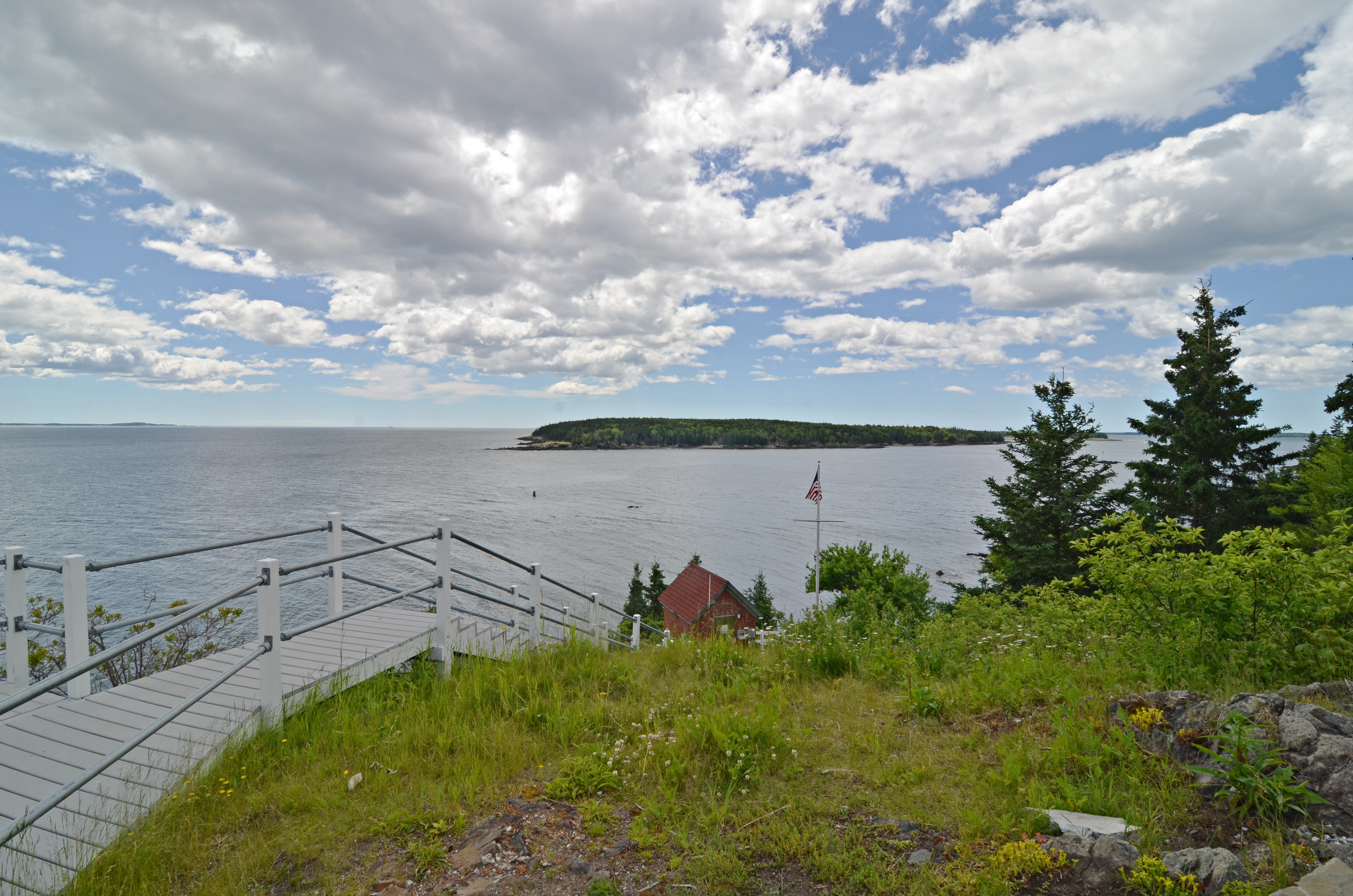
The view from the base of the tower

== See also ==
- National Register of Historic Places listings in Knox County, Maine
