= Owls Head Transportation Museum =

Transportation museum in Owls Head, Maine

Coordinates: 44.0664°N 69.1011°W

Owls Head Transportation Museum is a working museum located at Owls Head, Maine. Beginning with a suggestion put forward by Thomas J. Watson Jr., CEO of IBM, who maintained a home nearby, the museum was established in 1974 by the Owls Head Foundation. Its stated mission is to collect, preserve, exhibit and operate pre-1940 aircraft, ground vehicles, engines and related technologies significant to the evolution of transportation for the purpose of education. At the time of its founding, their collection comprised two automobiles, two aircraft, a high-wheel bicycle and a 100-ton steam engine, but has now grown to approximately 125 objects.

== Collection ==
=== Aircraft ===
The museum has 24 original and replica aircraft, including:

- Bleriot IX
- Boeing-Stearman Kaydet
- Bushmaster 2000
- Clark ornithopter
- Curtiss Model D (replica)
- Curtiss JN-4D Jenny
- de Havilland DH.82A Tiger Moth
- Domenjoz Sailing Glider
- Fokker Dr.I (replica)
- Great Lakes 2T-1A
- Keane Ace
- Milliken Special
- Mooney M-18 Mite
- Nieuport 28 (replica)
- North American T-6G Texan
- Piper J-3 Cub
- Royal Aircraft Factory FE.8
- Sopwith Pup
- SPAD XIII (replica)
- Standard J-1
- Waco UBF-2
- Wright Flyer (replica)

=== Automobiles ===
There are 54 vehicles, ranging in date from 1898 through to 1968.

=== Bicycles ===
There are 11 bicycles and tricycles, dating between the 1860s and 1940.

- ca. 1860s Velocipede
- ca. 1880-1889 Excelsior Highwheeler
- ca. 1880-1885 Quadrant Tricycle
- ca. 1881-1889 American Star Safety
- Empire Dwarf Safety Roadster
- ca. 1898 Orient Ladies Safety
- ca.1900-1906 Pierce Cushion Frame
- ca. 1927-1933 Colson Model JK-109 Fauntleroy
- 1930s Speed-O-Byke
- 1934-1937 Ingersoll-Rand Ingo-Bike
- 1940 Elgin 501-170

=== Motorcycles ===
The museum has 11 motorcycles, dating from 1901 through to the 1960s.

- 1869 Roper Steam Velocipede (replica)
- 1901 Steffey Motor-Bicycle
- 1919 ABC Sopwith 400
- 1919 Harley-Davidson Model J
- 1922 Royal Enfield Model 200
- 1925 Harley-Davidson Model JD
- 1931 Henderson KJ
- 1932 Harley-Davidson V
- 1938 Indian Junior Scout
- ca. 1946-1948 Whizzer Model H
- ca. 1960-1965 Centaur Suitcase Scooter

=== Carriages ===
There are 2 carriages; a mid-19th century stagecoach, and a British Romani wagon dating from the early 20th century.

=== Engines ===
The museum has 18 engines, meant for either stationary use or for transportation, The oldest is an 1895 compound steam engine, the most recent is an Allison J33 turbojet, circa 1955.

== See also ==
- List of transportation museums
