= Owls Head, Maine =

Town in Maine, United States

- Town
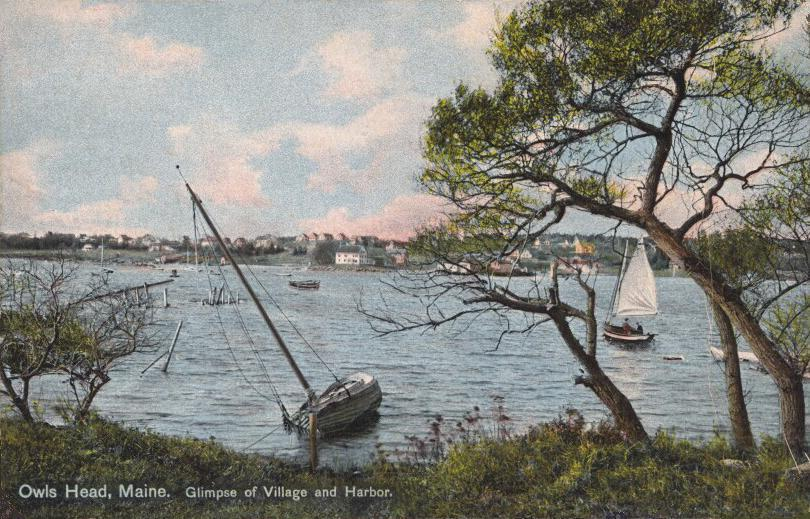
- View of village and harbor in 1910

- Seal

- Location in Knox County and the state of Maine.
- Coordinates: 44°04′49″N 69°03′26″W
- Country: United States
- State: Maine
- County: Knox
- Incorporated: 1921
- Villages: Owls Head; Ash Point; Crescent Beach; Holiday Beach

Area
  - Total: 19.61 sq mi (50.79 km^{2})
  - Land: 8.88 sq mi (23.00 km^{2})
  - Water: 10.73 sq mi (27.79 km^{2})
- Elevation: 13 ft (4.0 m)

Population (2020)
  - Total: 1,504
  - Density: 169/sq mi (65.4/km^{2})
- Time zone: UTC−5 (Eastern (EST))
  - Summer (DST): UTC−4 (EDT)
- ZIP Code: 04854
- Area code: 207
- FIPS code: 23-56135
- GNIS feature ID: 582656
- Website: owlshead.maine.gov

Owls Head is a town in Knox County, Maine, United States. The population was 1,504 at the 2020 census. A resort and fishing area, the community is home to the Knox County Regional Airport. It includes the village of Ash Point.

== History ==
When Samuel de Champlain explored Owl's Head in 1605, the Abenaki Indians called it Bedabedec Point, meaning "Cape of the Winds." Mariners would name it for the shape of the promontory, which they thought resembled the head of an owl. First incorporated as part of Thomaston in 1777, and then as part of South Thomaston in 1848, Owls Head was itself set off and incorporated on July 9, 1921. The town is home to both the Owls Head Light Station, a 30-foot (9.1 m) tall granite lighthouse built in 1826 to mark the southern entrance of Rockland Harbor, and to the Owls Head Transportation Museum.

Owls Head was home to an electric trolley line that traveled to Crescent Beach. It was started in 1902, and it ended in the years of 1917–1918, largely due in part to a deadly accident in 1914, in which a train left the tracks killing one woman instantly, and injuring several others.

In August 1940 (around the 13th), the English composer Benjamin Britten completed his Diversions for piano (left hand) and orchestra, Op. 21 while staying at the Owl's Head Inn—coincidentally meeting up with Kurt Weill with whom he got on well. On August 22, he wrote from Owl's Head to Elizabeth Mayer: "We eventually made Pemaquid Point, but found the place most disappointing—not on the sea, & full of the most terrible Bostonian old ladies, that we left after one gloomy night. Then we came on here which is a grand spot—very unpretentious—but quiet & right on the sea. We can work & there are tennis courts nearby. It is too cold to bathe unfortunately—but there is plenty else to do...."

Owls Head was a filming location for the 2001 movie In the Bedroom.

== Geography ==
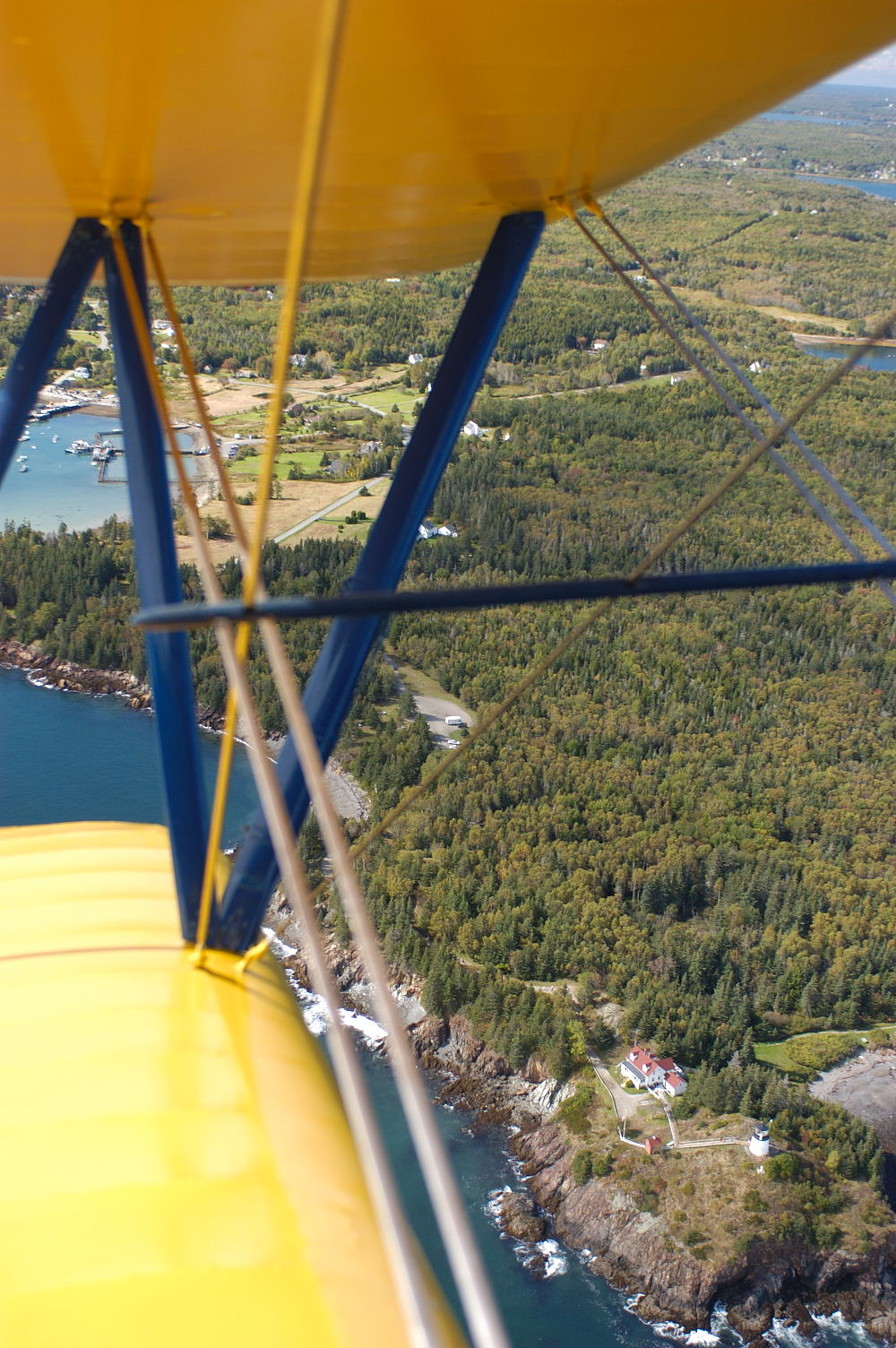
Owls Head Light and part of harbor viewed from the Owls Head Transportation Museum's Stearman Biplane, taken on 5 October 2003

According to the United States Census Bureau, the town has a total area of 19.61 square miles (50.79 km^{2}), of which 8.88 square miles (23.00 km^{2}) is land and 10.73 square miles (27.79 km^{2}) is water. Located on the Owls Head peninsula, the town is on Penobscot Bay. The highest point in Owls Head is Post Hill, 194 feet (59m) high.

== Demographics ==
Historical population
Census	Pop.	Note	%±
1930	574		—
1940	609		6.1%
1950	784		28.7%
1960	994		26.8%
1970	1,281		28.9%
1980	1,633		27.5%
1990	1,574		−3.6%
2000	1,601		1.7%
2010	1,580		−1.3%
2020	1,504		−4.8%
U.S. Decennial Census

=== 2010 census ===
As of the census of 2010, there were 1,580 people, 737 households, and 462 families living in the town. The population density was 177.9 inhabitants per square mile (68.7/km^{2}). There were 1,060 housing units at an average density of 119.4 per square mile (46.1/km^{2}). The racial makeup of the town was 97.7% White, 0.4% African American, 0.1% Native American, 0.2% Asian, 0.1% from other races, and 1.6% from two or more races. Hispanic or Latino of any race were 0.3% of the population.

There were 737 households, of which 20.8% had children under the age of 18 living with them, 52.6% were married couples living together, 7.7% had a female householder with no husband present, 2.3% had a male householder with no wife present, and 37.3% were non-families. Of all households, 30.1% were made up of individuals, and 13.3% had someone living alone who was 65 years of age or older. The average household size was 2.13 and the average family size was 2.61.

The median age in the town was 52.1 years. 16.5% of residents were under the age of 18; 4.3% were between the ages of 18 and 24; 18.5% were from 25 to 44; 35.8% were from 45 to 64; and 25% were 65 years of age or older. The gender makeup of the town was 48.2% male and 51.8% female.

=== 2000 census ===
As of the census of 2000, there were 1,601 people, 723 households, and 469 families living in the town. The population density was 180.1 inhabitants per square mile (69.5/km^{2}). There were 992 housing units at an average density of 111.6 per square mile (43.1/km^{2}). The racial makeup of the town was 98.94% White, 0.06% African American, 0.06% Native American, 0.19% Asian, 0.12% from other races, and 0.62% from two or more races. Hispanic or Latino of any race were 0.31% of the population.

There were 723 households, out of which 21.3% had children under the age of 18 living with them, 56.2% were married couples living together, 6.2% had a female householder with no husband present, and 35.1% were non-families. Of all households, 29.3% were made up of individuals, and 14.7% had someone living alone who was 65 years of age or older. The average household size was 2.20 and the average family size was 2.68.

In the town, the population was spread out, with 18.6% under the age of 18, 5.2% from 18 to 24, 22.3% from 25 to 44, 29.8% from 45 to 64, and 24.1% who were 65 years of age or older. The median age was 47 years. For every 100 females, there were 92.9 males. For every 100 females age 18 and over, there were 88.0 males.

The median income for a household in the town was $40,107, and the median income for a family was $49,231. Males had a median income of $31,685 versus $21,970 for females. The per capita income for the town was $22,660. About 4.2% of families and 8.1% of the population were below the poverty line, including 11.0% of those under age 18 and 6.7% of those age 65 or over.

== Locations ==
- Birch Point State Park
- Knox County Regional Airport [KRKD, RKD]
- Mussel Ridge Historical Society
- Owls Head Light Station
- Owls Head Transportation Museum
