= Owl's Head Park =

Public park in Brooklyn, New York

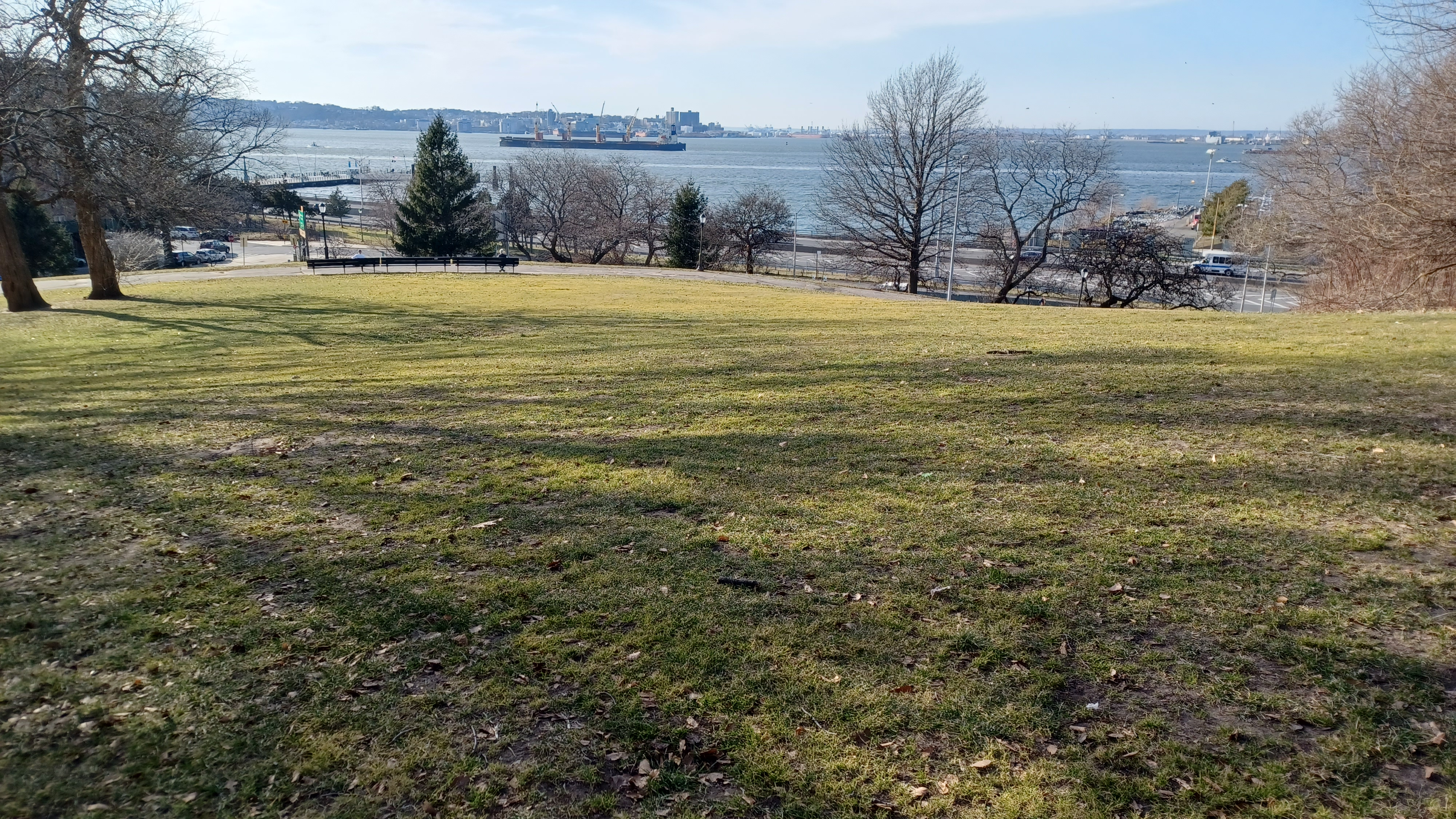
- Upper New York Bay as seen from Owls Head Park
- Interactive map of Owl's Head Park
- Type: Urban park
- Location: Brooklyn, New York City, New York, U.S.
- Coordinates: 40.6406°N 74.0322°W
- Area: 24.22 acres (9.80 ha; 0.03784 mi^{2}; 0.0980 km^{2})
- Created: 1928
- Owner: NYC Parks
- Open: 6:00 a.m. to 1:00 a.m.
- Public transit: Bus

Owl's Head Park is a public park in Bay Ridge, Brooklyn, New York.

== History ==
The land that would become Owl's Head Park was first settled by the Canarsee. In the 17th century, Dutch settlers arrived in the area. The first European to claim ownership of the park's land was Teunis Van Pelt. On April 13, 1680, he sold a section of his land to Swaen Janse Van Lowaanen, whose farm on the water, north of what is now known as Bay Ridge Avenue, eventually became the park. The land passed through several more hands before ending up with Henry C. Murphy, who in 1856 built a large mansion on the property. Murphy was a state senator best known for writing the legislation that began construction on the Brooklyn Bridge, which was signed at his Owl's Head estate.

The source of the name has been debated. Common theories are that owls used to live there or that from the harbor the elevated ridge looks like an owl's head. It dates to at least 1844 when the United States Coast Survey marked Owl's Head where the park is located today. Half a century later, in 1890, the Brooklyn Daily Eagle published a letter stating Senator Murphy mistakenly appropiated the name from a point a mile south as did a book of reminiscences from 1913.

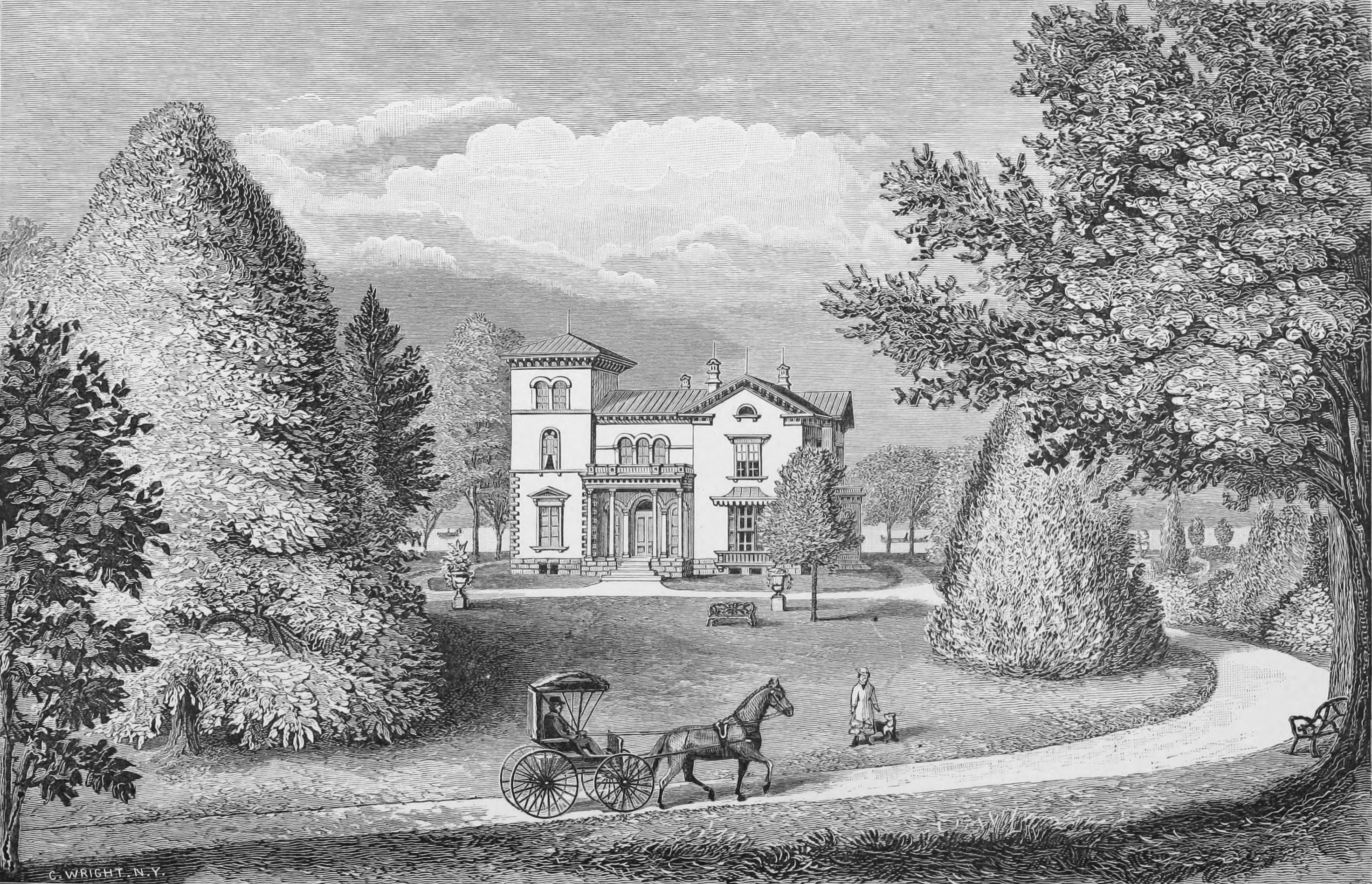
The Owl's Head mansion of E. W. Bliss, ca. 1884

Murphy sold the property to Eliphalet Williams Bliss, founder of the E.W. Bliss Company. The park is known to some as "Bliss Park" for this reason. Bliss expanded the property by buying nearby land and added new structures to the estate. These structures included a long driveway, a keeper's lodge, a stable, and an observatory and tower. As early as 1894, Bliss embraced the idea of his property one day becoming a public park. After his death in 1903, his will stipulated that the property be sold to the city for a reduced price, but only if it was to be used as parkland. For various reasons, the city did not buy the property until 1928. These delays caused parts of the property to be lost to other purchasers, including the portion directly along the water, which has been home to a wastewater treatment plant since 1952. Financial limitations and lack of political will also led to the demolition of the property's mansion and observatory tower in 1932. By 1940, the stables were also demolished.

In the following decades, improvements to the park were made by the Parks Department under Robert Moses, including paths, playing fields, benches and restrooms. In the 1960s and 70s, however, the park suffered from decline during the city's fiscal crisis. In the 1990s, Brooklyn's borough president and the city council dedicated significant funds to revamp the park. The original wrought iron gates from Bliss's estate, with his initials on them, were reinstalled at the park's southeastern entrance in 2004.

== Features ==
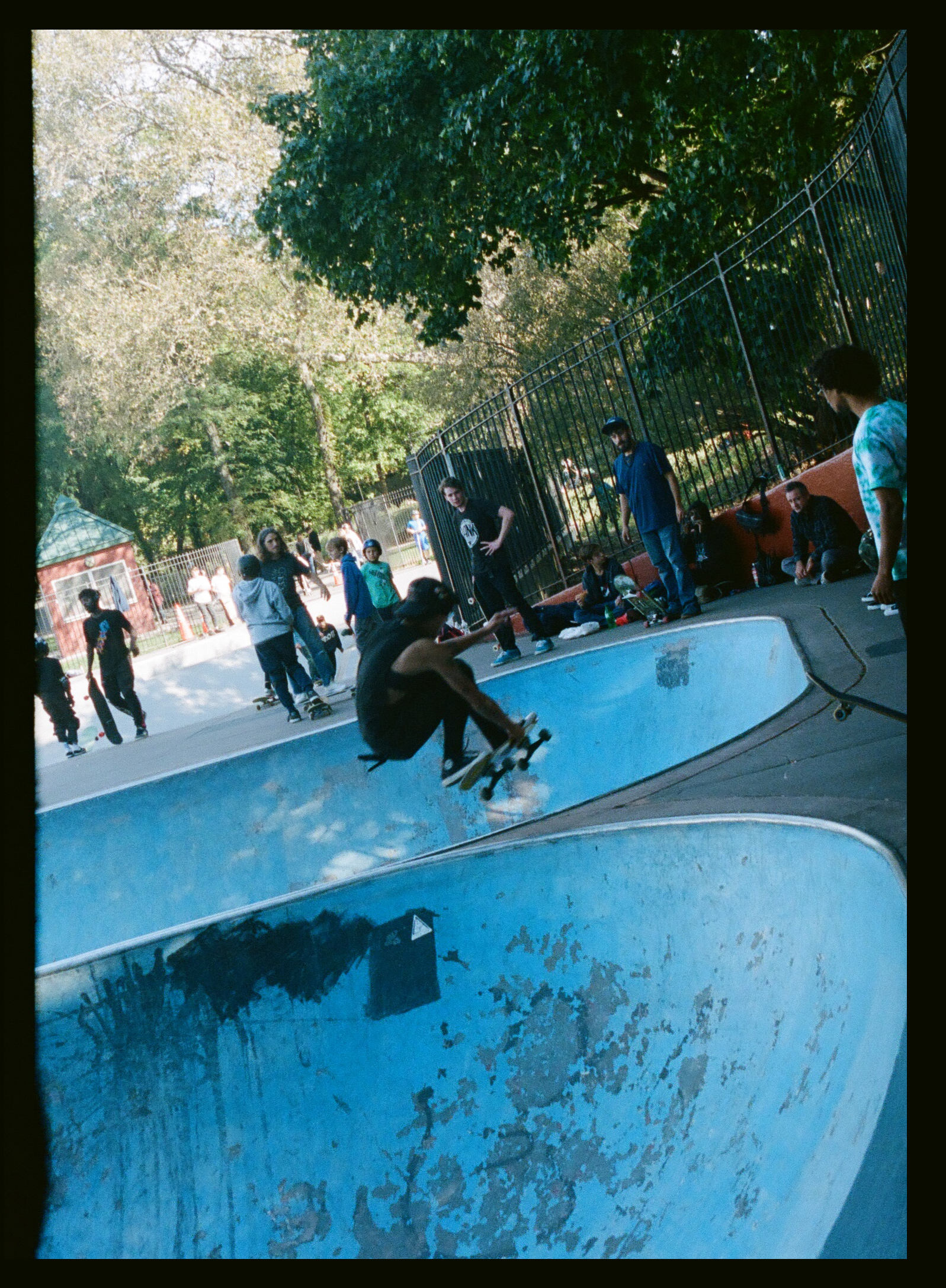
Skate park in Owl's Head Park.

Owl's Head Park is located on a glacial moraine and thus has rich soil to support its many trees, including pines, locusts, oaks, maples, corks, beeches, and a tulip poplar. The park's land slopes upward towards the water, providing views across New York harbor to Manhattan, Staten Island, and New Jersey. The sloping terrain of the park also makes it a popular place for sledding in the winter. The park has basketball courts, a playground, spray pool, and dog run, as well as a well-known skate park. The park's basketball courts are named for William D. "Billy" Lake, a local firefighter who lost his life on September 11, 2001. The courts were named in honor of Lake in 2004.

The park often hosts local events, such as Viking Fest, which honors the area's history of Scandinavian immigration, Halloween events, and the city's annual Mulchfest event for Christmas tree disposal. In 2022, Owl's Head Park was the site of the first-ever Gay Ridge Pride, an LGBTQ pride event for all of Southern Brooklyn and the neighborhood's first pride celebration.
