= Sunset Park Greenway =

Biking route in New York City

- Length: 4.41 mi (7.10 km)
- Trailheads: Ocean Parkway Greenway; Shore Parkway Greenway
- Use: Cycling
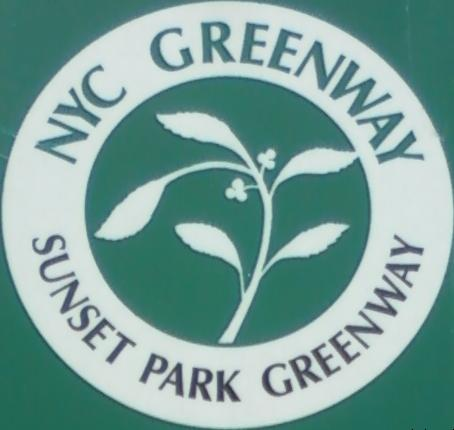
- Waymark

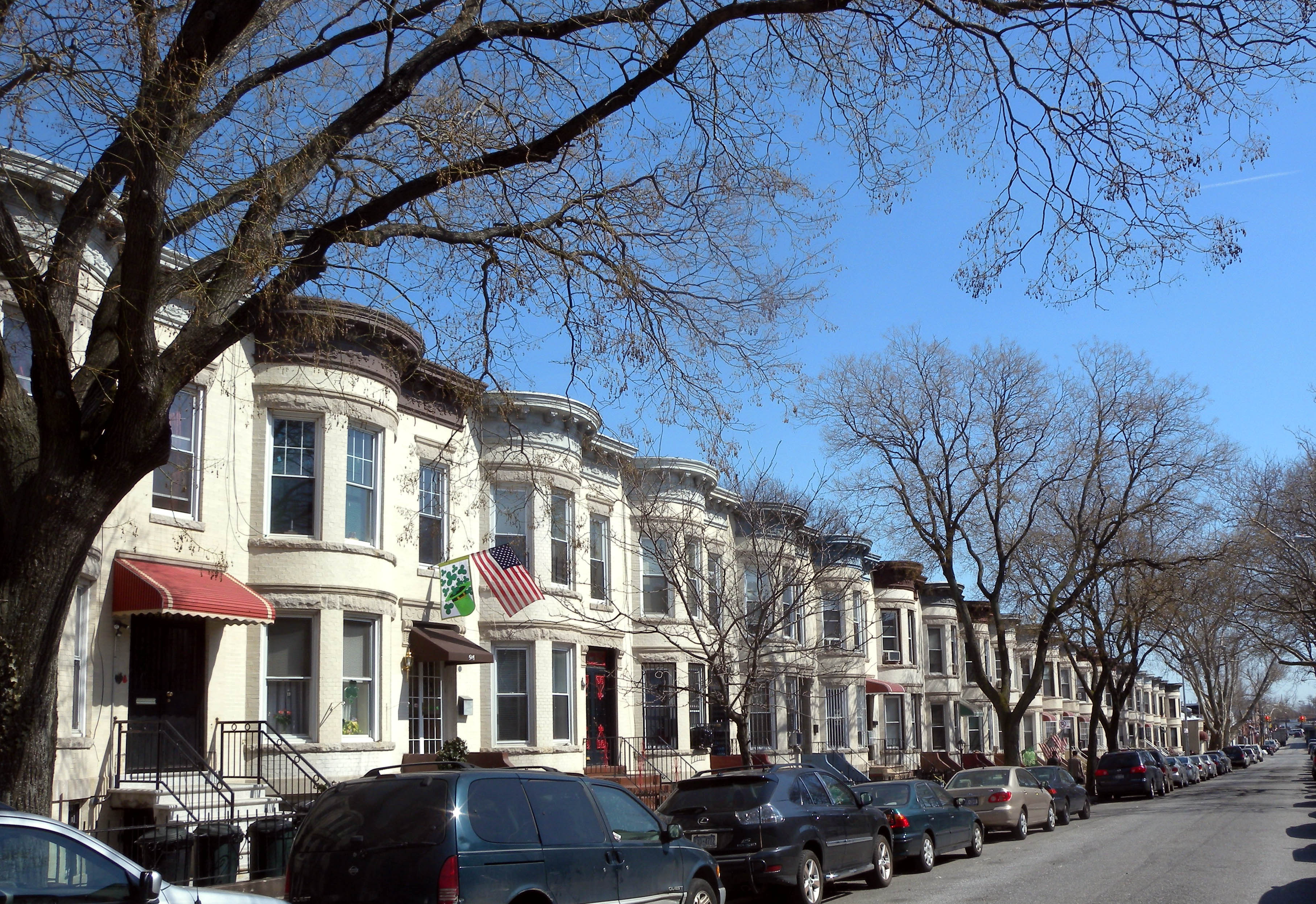
A northbound section of the Sunset Park Greenway along 62nd Street

The Sunset Park Greenway (SPGW; also known as the Shore Parkway Greenway Connector) is a 4.41 mile (7.10 km)-long, signed cycle route traversing Sunset Park, Brooklyn with portions running through the adjacent neighborhoods of Bay Ridge, Borough Park and Kensington.

== Route description ==
The Sunset Park Greenway's north/east-bound route begins as a separate bicycle/pedestrian path at the northwestern terminus of the Shore Parkway Greenway at the 69th Street pier at Bay Ridge Avenue and Shore Road in Bay Ridge. The curved, terraced path, runs north for one block along the western edge of Shore Road to 68th Street where it crosses Shore Road and enters Owl's Head Park. Through Owl's Head, the greenway follows a paved path along the park's outer perimeter exiting onto a bike lane on Wakeman Place at Colonial Road. A Brooklyn Waterfront Greenway is planned to connect Owl's Head to Downtown Brooklyn and Greenpoint, Brooklyn.

The SPGW follows Wakeman Place to 3rd Avenue where it veers northbound onto a short bike lane on the Belt Parkway overpass and immediately takes a hard 90° right turn into Leif Ericson Park. The greenway follows the park's north path to 5th Avenue at 66th Street. At 5th Avenue, the route travels northbound to 62nd Street where it enters Sunset Park proper just after 65th Street. This stretch is signed but does not contain a painted bike lane. At 62nd Street, the greenway heads eastbound along a bike lane on the north side of the street, at 7th Avenue, the greenway veers north along a bike lane to 42nd Street. At 42nd Street, the SPGW heads eastbound to 9th Avenue along a bike lane on the north side of the street and continues north and east to connect to the Brooklyn-Queens Greenway.

An extension of the Sunset Park Greenway on 3rd Avenue between Hamilton Avenue and 26th Street opened in 2026.
