= Rachelle Vinberg =

American skateboarder and actress

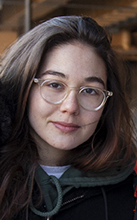
- Vinberg in 2019
- Born: August 27, 1998 (age 27); Long Island, New York, U.S
- Occupations: Skateboarder; actress
- Years active: 2016–present

Rachelle Vinberg (born August 27, 1998) is an American skateboarder and actress. She is best known for starring as Camille, a fictionalized version of herself, in the film Skate Kitchen and the TV series Betty inspired by the real group of female skaters she is a part of.

== Early life and education ==
Vinberg was born in Long Island, New York, to divorced parents, a Colombian mother and an American father. She has an older brother and a younger brother. As of 2018, Vinberg was a sophomore at Brooklyn College, where she was majoring in film.

== Career ==
=== Skateboarding ===
Vinberg learned to ollie the summer before she turned 12, taught by an older cousin. Vinberg continued learning tricks by watching YouTube and started skating with the boys in her neighborhood. Vinberg befriended Nina Moran over YouTube and the two started skating together in NYC. While in NYC, Vinberg and Moran met Crystal Moselle. Moselle shot a 13-minute film with Vinberg, Moran and several of their friends titled That One Day, which was then reworked and expanded into the feature film, Skate Kitchen.

=== Acting ===
Vinberg was skating at LES Skatepark when a casting director approached her to appear in "A Perfect Day", a Samsung commercial directed by Cary Fukunaga. In 2018, Vinberg played Camille in Crystal Moselle's film Skate Kitchen. Vinberg stars in the HBO produced series Betty, based on Skate Kitchen.

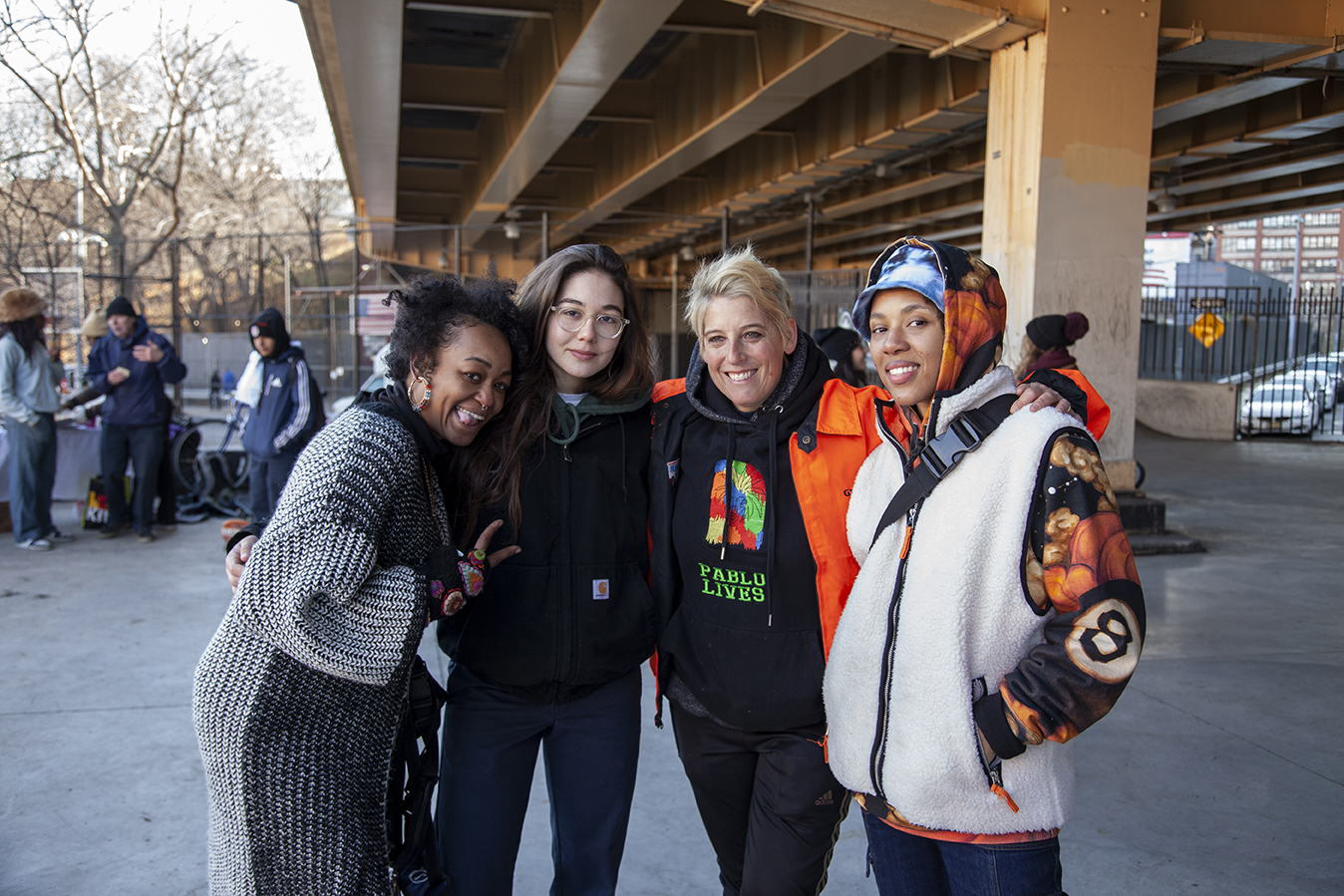
Rachelle, Loren Michelle (Pablo Ramirez's mother), Dede Lovelace, and friend at a skatepark clean-up at Fat Kid Skatepark – Dec, 2019

== Filmography ==
=== Film ===
Year	Title	Role	Director	Notes
2016	That One Day	Rachelle	Crystal Moselle	Short film
2018	Skate Kitchen	Camille	Crystal Moselle	

=== Television ===
Year	Title	Role	Director	Notes
2020–2021	Betty	Camille	Crystal Moselle	12 episodes
