= Skate Kitchen =

2018 film by Crystal Moselle

- Theatrical release poster
- Directed by: Crystal Moselle
- Screenplay by: Aslihan Unaldi; Crystal Moselle; Jennifer Silverman
- Story by: Crystal Moselle
- Based on: That One Day by Crystal Moselle
- Produced by: Lizzie Nastro; Isabella Tzenkova; Crystal Moselle; Julia Nottingham; Rodrigo Teixeira; Michael Sherman; Matthew Perniciaro
- Starring: Rachelle Vinberg; Dede Lovelace; Nina Moran; Kabrina Adams; Ajani Russell; Jules Lorenzo; Brenn Lorenzo; Elizabeth Rodriguez; Jaden Smith
- Cinematography: Shabier Kirchner
- Edited by: Nico Leunen
- Music by: Aska Matsumiya
- Production companies: Bow and Arrow Entertainment; RT Features; Pulse Films; Tango Entertainment
- Distributed by: Magnolia Pictures
- Release dates: January 21, 2018 (Sundance); August 10, 2018 (United States)
- Running time: 105 minutes
- Country: United States
- Language: English
- Box office: $268,021

Skate Kitchen is a 2018 American teen drama film written and directed by Crystal Moselle based on her short film That One Day. Rachelle Vinberg stars as Camille, a teenage girl who befriends a group of female skateboarders in New York City. It is inspired by the real group of female skaters based in New York who call themselves "Skate Kitchen" and features the group's members playing fictionalized versions of themselves.

Moselle decided to create a film about the real members of the Skate Kitchen collective when she met two of them by chance on a subway train, and wrote the script based on Vinberg's own experiences. The majority of the cast were non-professional actors, who spent eight months in acting and improvisational classes prior to filming. The film was shot on location in New York City.

Skate Kitchen premiered at the 2018 Sundance Film Festival and was released on August 10, 2018 by Magnolia Pictures. It grossed $268,000 at the box office and was well received by critics. A spin-off television series made by HBO titled Betty premiered on May 1, 2020.

== Plot ==
Camille is an 18-year-old living on Long Island with her conservative single mother. After a skateboarding injury, her mother makes her promise not to skate anymore. Nevertheless, Camille is still infatuated with skateboarding and when she sees that Skate Kitchen, a collective of female skaters that she follows on Instagram, is holding a meetup in New York City, she decides to go.

Though Camille is shy, the other girls are instantly welcoming. They are more rebellious than Camille, smoking cannabis and already sexually active. Camille explains her time away to her mother by telling her that she is studying at the library. One day, however, she misses her train home and her mother confiscates her skateboard. Camille's new friends help her to build a new board and Janay, one of the girls from Skate Kitchen, offers to let Camille stay with her. A few days later the move becomes permanent when Camille's mother shows up at a skate park and violently confronts Camille.

Camille finds a job at a grocery store and begins spending all her time with the Skate Kitchen crew. She develops a crush on Devon, a skater from a different crew, only to learn that he and Janay had an on-and-off relationship together for years. When Janay rolls her ankle and is housebound for several weeks, Camille begins spending more time with Devon and his friends.

Janay eventually finds pictures of Camille taken by Devon and confronts Camille, assuming they are in a sexual relationship. Camille is cast out from the Skate Kitchen group and decides to stay with Devon in a run-down apartment filled with lewd and obnoxious male skaters. After Camille kisses Devon, he stops her and tells her that he thinks of her as a younger sister. A despondent Camille returns home to her mother, who welcomes her and suggests apologizing when she finds out that Camille has fallen out with her new friends. Camille sends them a message via Instagram apologizing for her role in their falling out.

The film's final scene shows Camille reunited with the other girls, skating through the streets of Manhattan.

== Cast ==
- Rachelle Vinberg as Camille
- Dede Lovelace as Janay
- Nina Moran as Kurt
- Kabrina Adams as Ruby
- Ajani Russell as Indigo
- Jules Lorenzo as Eliza
- Brenn Lorenzo as Quinn
- Elizabeth Rodriguez as Renata
- Jaden Smith as Devon

== Production ==
Skate Kitchen is the name of a real group of female skateboarders in New York City, named as a tongue-in-cheek reference to comments left on the members' YouTube videos suggesting that women "should be in the kitchen" rather than skateboarding. The group has seven core members—Nina Moran, Rachelle Vinberg, Kabrina Adams, Ajani Russell, Dede Lovelace, and Brenn and Jules Lorenzo—who all appear in the feature film. Writer–director Crystal Moselle met Moran and Vinberg on a subway train in Brooklyn and asked them if they would be interesting in collaborating on a film. In 2016, she created a short film about the group, That One Day, for Miu Miu's Women's Tales series which was a precursor to the feature film.

Moselle originally wanted to film a feature-length documentary about the group, but decided instead to create a fictional work featuring the group as dramatized versions of themselves. The main story was based on Vinberg's adolescence, her experience moving to New York, and her relationship with her Colombian mother. Apart from Jaden Smith and Elizabeth Rodriguez, all of the principal cast members were non-professional actors. Moselle spent eight months with the cast while they developed the script, worked with an acting coach, went to improv classes, and rehearsed scenes. Jaden Smith was cast at the suggestion of Vinberg when Moselle asked if any of the Skate Kitchen members knew a professional actor who could also skate; Smith and Vinberg had previously met on Instagram.

The film was shot on location in New York City during the summer, with filming locations including the LES Skatepark on the Lower East Side and a skate park in Queens. The cinematographer was Shabier Kirchner, who shot the film on an Alexa Mini camera. Some of the shots inside skate parks were filmed by a handheld camera operator on a skateboard, while shots of skateboarding on the streets were filmed using a motorized skate deck that could travel at speeds up to 20 miles per hour (32 km/h). One scene which was not included in the final cut of the film features 60 skateboarders skating from the Lower East Side over the Williamsburg Bridge into Brooklyn; cameras were mounted on a rickshaw and a motorized skateboard, and crew members followed the action on roller blades, bicycles and skateboards. Moselle's first cut of the film was almost five hours long, which she and editor Nico Leunen later reduced to a final cut of 105 minutes.

== Release ==
Skate Kitchen premiered on January 21, 2018 at the Sundance Film Festival. The film's North American distribution rights were picked up by Magnolia Pictures in February 2018, while Modern Films secured the UK distribution rights in April 2018. It was released theatrically in the United States on August 10, 2018, originally showing in just one theater, IFC Center in New York City; it earned $17,000 in its opening weekend. It expanded to Los Angeles and other locations on August 17 and to further cities on August 24. The film grossed a total of $236,799 during an eight-week theatrical run in North America and $31,222 at the international box office, for a worldwide total gross of $268,021. It was released on DVD and Blu-ray on November 20, 2018.

== Reception ==
Skate Kitchen received a score of 90% on Rotten Tomatoes, based on 99 reviews, and an average rating of 7.3/10. The site's consensus reads, "Skate Kitchen takes a beguiling slice-of-life approach to its characters, approaching its timely themes with a light hand that serves the story well." Metacritic gives the film a score of 72 out of 100, based on reviews from 29 critics, indicating "generally favorable reviews".

Carly Lewis of The Globe and Mail gave Skate Kitchen 3.5 stars out of 4, commending its authentic depiction of female friendships. Writing for Variety, Andrew Barker praised the naturalism of the film and the "entirely believable" dialogue between the young women. The Guardian's Peter Bradshaw, who awarded the film 4 out of 5 stars, commended its "seductively laid-back documentary realist style" and the way it subverts the skateboarding film genre. Similarly, Jimi Famurewa of Empire described Skate Kitchen as "fresh, infectiously joyful and [...] quietly revolutionary", rating it 4 out of 5 stars. In a review for Entertainment Weekly, Leah Greenblatt called the film "a fantastically set mood piece" and gave particular praise to the "urban poetry" of Shabier Kirchner's cinematography. The New York Times critic Glenn Kenny described Skate Kitchen as "a doc-narrative hybrid", commending the nostalgic feel of the film and its compassion for the characters it depicts.

Eric Kohn of IndieWire gave the film a B+ but felt that the character of Devon was "an obvious attempt to shoehorn a plot device" into the narrative. RogerEbert.com film critic Matt Zoller Seitz agreed, finding Skate Kitchen "hugely appealing" on the whole but describing the plot points with Devon and the conflict between Camille and her mother as "conventional" and "contrived". The Guardian's Charles Bramesco also found the conflict with Devon "contrived in comparison to the comfortable naturalism between the girls", and described Camille's troubled relationship with her mother as formulaic. In a mostly positive review for The Hollywood Reporter, John DeFore wrote that the film "telegraphs a couple of plot points too strongly" but felt that it was not too heavy-handed with its themes. Mick LaSalle of the San Francisco Chronicle reviewed Skate Kitchen harshly, describing it as uninteresting, "meaningless", and without any compelling narrative.

== Spin-off series ==
In December 2018, HBO announced that it was developing a spin-off television series based on Skate Kitchen to be written and executive produced by Moselle and Lesley Arfin. Production began on the series, titled Betty, in 2019. The six-episode series, which premiered on May 1, 2020, features Vinberg, Moran, Adams, Lovelace, and Russell reprising their roles from the film.
