= Erin Patrice O'Brien =

American photographer

Erin Patrice O’Brien is a portrait and reportage photographer based in Brooklyn, New York. She has extensively photographed the entertainment industry.

== Photography career ==
In the late 1990s, O'Brien became a contributor to Vibe magazine. At the same time, she also worked as an assistant photo editor and contributing photographer for Stress Magazine. Since then, O'Brien has shot editorial and reportage work for a range of publications and clients including New York Magazine, The Atlantic, The Hollywood Reporter, The New York Times, People, Texas Monthly, Rolling Stone, The Wall Street Journal, Newsweek, and others. She has extensively photographed the entertainment industry, from comedians Dave Chappelle, Stephen Colbert, Tina Fey, and John Leguizamo to hip-hop artists Janelle Monáe, Missy Elliott, Erykah Badu, Lil Wayne, Questlove, and others.

For two years, she documented girls in New York City's Mexican-American community for a project entitled "Mamás Adolescentes: NYC 2006-2007". O'Brien showed the series of large-scale portraits in 2008 at the Rush Corridor Gallery in Brooklyn.

O'Brien has an ongoing project documenting the Afropunk Festival. Since 2019, O'Brien has been documenting feminist and gender nonconforming skateboarders in a project titled "Portrait of a Skateboard". She became interested in the subject matter while accompanying her daughter to an all-girls skate session hosted by Quell Skateboarding and the Skate Kitchen.
