= Steve Rodriguez (skateboarder) =

American skateboarder

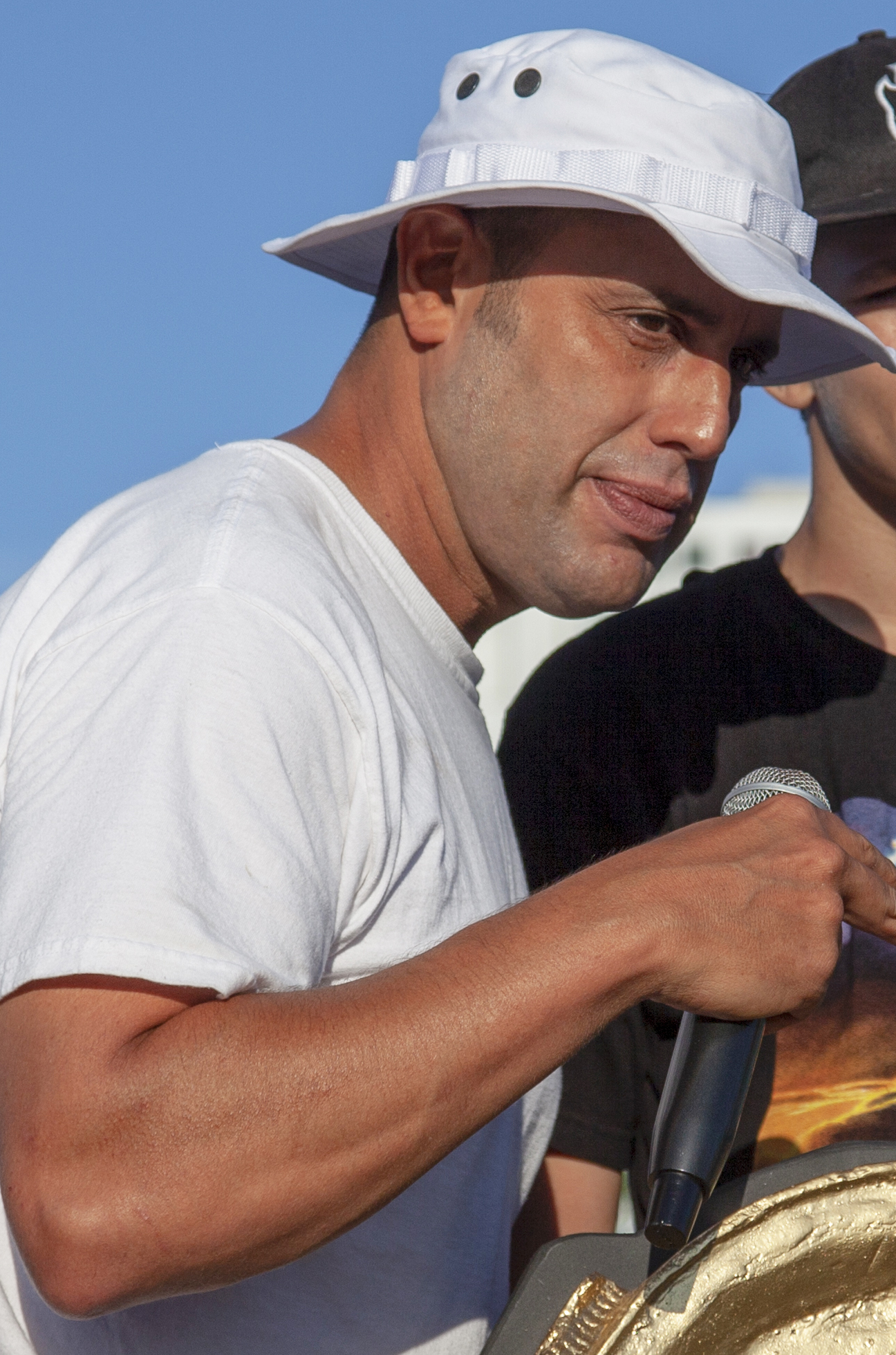
- Rodriguez at the 2019 Battle at the Beach – Far Rockaway Skatepark, Queens, NY

Personal information
- Birth name: Steven Rodriguez
- Nationality: American
- Born: Sayreville, New Jersey, U.S.

Sport
- Country: USA
- Sport: Skateboarding

Steve Rodriguez (born 1971) is an American goofy-footed skateboarder, skate company owner, skatepark designer, and community organizer based in New York City. He is a leader in the effort to restore the iconic New York City skate spot Brooklyn Banks, a place where Rodriguez spent much time skateboarding. Until it closed for construction in 2010, Rodriguez hosted skate contests at the Banks.

== Early life ==
Raised in Sayreville, New Jersey, Rodriguez discovered skateboarding around 1983 and started skating not long after. He started skating in New York City as a teen, working for his mom who managed a store in the city. Rodriguez would skate through the city while doing deliveries and running other errands.

== Skateboarding career ==
In 1996, Rodriguez and a group of NYC skaters founded 5Boro Skateboards. The original 5Boro squad consisted of Andy Henry, Neil Morgan, Pat Guidotti, Jim Young, JP Lotz, Alex Corporan, Dan Pensyl, Tato Feliciano, Ben Wall, and Jay Hammond. In 2004, 5Boro collaborated with the Beastie Boys to produce an exclusive co-branded board graphic.

=== Skate video appearances ===
- 1999: Fire It Up – 5boro
- 2004: Word of Mouth – 5boro
- 2007: Short Ends – Champman Skateboards
- 2012: Join, or Die – 5boro

=== Skateparks designed or co-designed ===
- LES Skatepark
- Golconda Skatepark (Fat Kid)
- Sgt. William Dougherty Skate Park
- River Avenue Skate Park

== External like ==
- Media related to Steve Rodriguez (skateboarder) at Wikimedia Commons
