= The Wolfpack =

2015 film by Crystal Moselle

- Theatrical release poster
- Directed by: Crystal Moselle
- Produced by: Izabella Tzenkova; Crystal Moselle; Hunter Gray; Alex Orlovsky
- Edited by: Enat Sidi
- Music by: Danny Bensi; Saunder Jurriaans; Aska Matsumiya
- Production companies: Kotva Films; Verisimilitude
- Distributed by: Magnolia Pictures
- Release dates: January 25, 2015 (Sundance); June 12, 2015
- Running time: 90 minutes
- Country: United States
- Language: English
- Box office: $1.2 million

The Wolfpack is a 2015 American documentary film directed by Crystal Moselle. It is about the Angulo family, who homeschooled and raised their seven children (six boys and one girl) in the confinement of their apartment on the Lower East Side of Manhattan in New York City. The film premiered on January 25, 2015, at the Sundance Film Festival, where it won the U.S. Documentary Grand Jury Prize.

== Synopsis ==
Locked away in an apartment on the Lower East Side of Manhattan for fourteen years, the seven children of the Angulo family—daughter Visnu and six sons: Bhagavan (b. 1991/1992), twins Narayana (who now goes by Josef) and Govinda (b. 1993/1994), Mukunda (b. 1995/1996), Krisna (who now goes by Glenn; b. 1997/1998), and Jagadesh (who now goes by Eddie; b. 1998/1999)—learned about the outside world by watching films, and eventually began to re-enact scenes from their favorite movies using elaborate homemade props and costumes. Their father, Oscar, had the only key to the door of their sixteenth story four-bedroom apartment in the Seward Park Extension housing project, and he prohibited the children or their mother, Susanne, who homeschooled the children, from leaving the apartment, except for a few strictly monitored trips on the "nefarious" streets of New York City each year.

Everything changed for the family when, at 15-years-old, Mukunda decided to walk around the neighborhood in January 2010, against Oscar's instruction to remain inside. After that, all of the brothers gradually begin to explore Manhattan and the world beyond the walls of their apartment.

== Production ==
While walking down First Avenue in Manhattan one day in 2010, Crystal Moselle, a graduate of New York's School of Visual Arts, chanced upon the six Angulo brothers, who were then between 11 and 18 years old. Struck by their appearance—the brothers were each wearing black Ray-Ban sunglasses reminiscent of Reservoir Dogs and had waist-long hair—she approached them and struck up a conversation. Moselle became friends with the boys, and she later found out that: they had been largely confined to their Manhattan apartment for 14 years; they had learned about the world by watching movies; and most, if not all, social situations were new to them. The brothers quickly bonded with Moselle due to their shared love of film.

The Tribeca Film Institute provided financial support and assistance to Moselle.

== Release ==
After its premiere at the 2015 Sundance Film Festival, Magnolia Pictures bought the film's worldwide distribution rights.

The film was the closing night film of the 2015 Maryland Film Festival. It had its London premiere on August 21, 2015.

== Reception ==
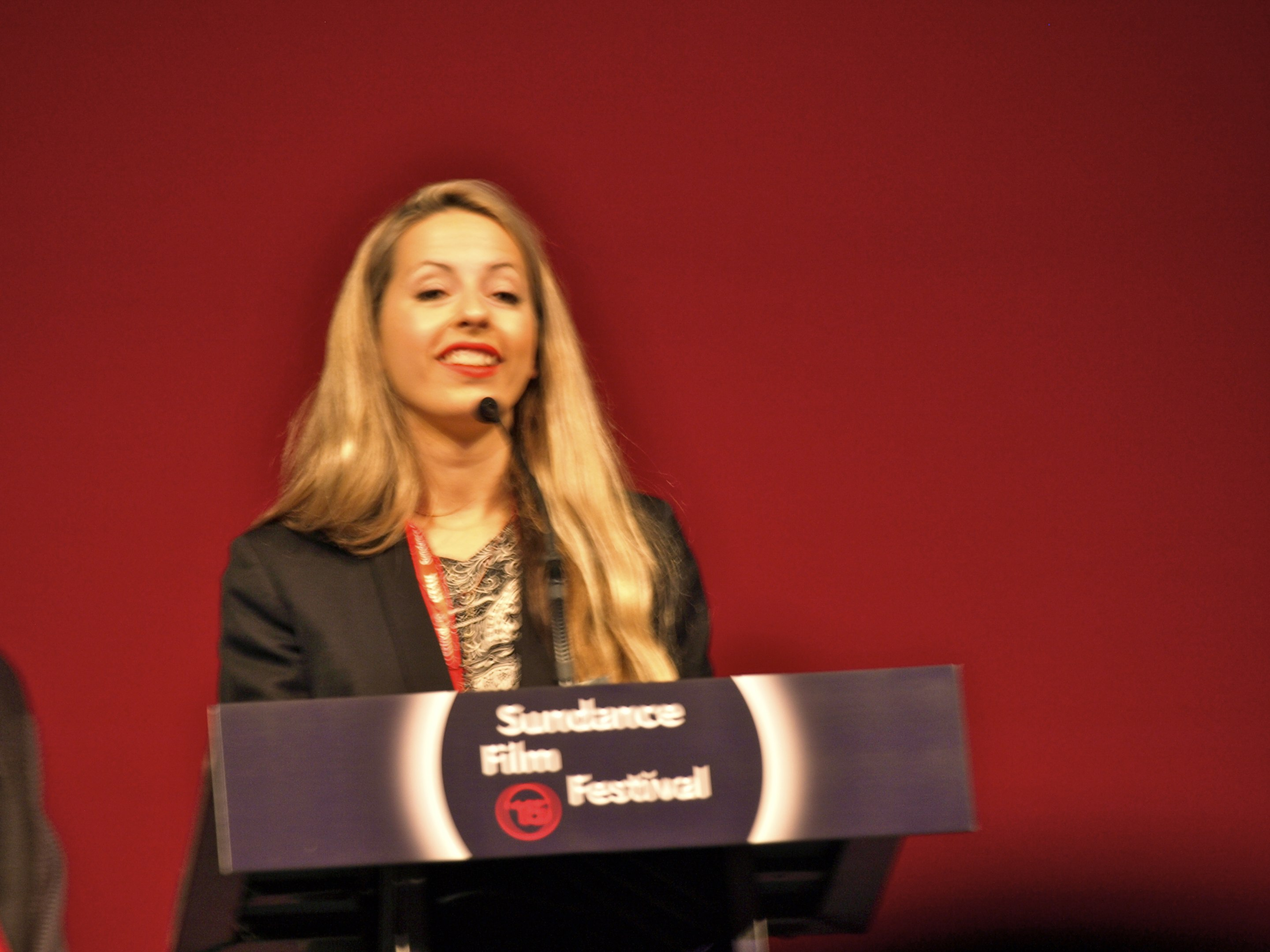
Crystal Moselle, director of The Wolfpack, at the 2015 Sundance Film Festival

On review aggregator website Rotten Tomatoes, 87% of 149 film critics' reviews of the film are positive, with an average score 7.2/10; the site's "critics consensus" reads: "Offering a unique look at modern fears and our fascination with film, The Wolfpack is a fascinating—and ultimately haunting—urban fable." On Metacritic, the film has a weighted average score of 74 out of 100, based on reviews from 25 critics, indicating "generally favorable reviews".

Jordan Hoffman of The Guardian gave the film a five-star review and compared it to Grey Gardens (1975), saying: "Not since Grey Gardens has a film invited us into such a strange, barely-functioning home and allowed us to gawk without reservation." Scott Foundas of Variety also gave the film a positive review, writing: "There is much to enjoy in director Crystal Moselle's debut documentary feature, which if nothing else begs a where-are-they-now sequel a few years down the road." In his review for Indiewire, Eric Kohn gave the film a B+, saying that "Crystal Moselle's portrait of teens trapped in an apartment for most of their lives is filled with compelling mysteries." Jordan Raup of The Film Stage said in his review that "The Wolfpack is an endlessly fascinating documentary, but it’s not quite a great one."

John DeFore of The Hollywood Reporter was more critical of the film, writing: "This debut doc doesn't quite make the most of fascinating and likeable subjects." Kate Erbland of The Playlist said that "The Wolfpack is a film about access, and though we are admitted into the world of the eponymous Wolfpack, not understanding how we got there robs the film of compelling commentary."

Some reviews discussed ethical issues about the making of the film. Paul Byrne, while conceding that The Wolfpack tells "a confronting and confounding true story", wrote: "Some of the boys were barely teenagers when Moselle started to film, too young to give consent. The sister is mentally handicapped, so incapable of consent. The father might be mentally ill – another problem of consent...The question then becomes how much [Moselle's] presence changes what we see." Steve Thomas of The Conversation pointed to "ethical questions surrounding The Wolfpack", saying: "truth is that whilst filmmakers can cite signed release forms to justify their actions, these are just pieces of paper. Consent in longitudinal documentary projects (which follow people over a long period of time) is an ongoing process."

The film's story was covered in the June 19, 2015, episode of ABC's 20/20.

== Accolades ==
List of Accolades
Award / Film Festival	Category	Recipient(s)	Result
31st Sundance Film Festival	Grand Jury Prize (U.S. Documentary)	Crystal Moselle	Won

Awards
Preceded by Rich Hill	Sundance Grand Jury Prize: U.S. Documentary; 2015	Succeeded by Weiner
