= Moonbear =

Actress, skateboarder, DJ, and vlogger

Moonbear (born Kabrina Adams; 1994) is an actress, skateboarder, DJ, and vlogger. Moonbear starred as Ruby in the 2018 film Skate Kitchen, and played Honeybear in the HBO TV series Betty from 2020 until the series' cancelation in 2021.
