= Ajani Russell =

Actress, skateboarder, and model

- Born: Ajani Russell; U.S.
- Occupations: skateboarder, actress, and model
- Years active: 2018–present

Ajani Russell is an American skateboarder, actress, and model. Russell is best known for playing Indigo in the 2018 film Skate Kitchen and in the 2020 HBO television series adaptation Betty.
