= Betty (TV series) =

2020 American teen comedy television series

- Genre: Teen comedy
- Created by: Crystal Moselle
- Based on: Skate Kitchen by: Crystal Moselle; That One Day; by Crystal Moselle
- Directed by: Crystal Moselle
- Starring: Dede Lovelace; Moonbear; Nina Moran; Ajani Russell; Rachelle Vinberg
- Music by: Aska Matsumiya
- Country of origin: United States
- Original language: English
- No. of seasons: 2
- No. of episodes: 12

Production
- Executive producers: Crystal Moselle; Lesley Arfin (season 1); Igor Srubshchik; Jason Weinberg; Alliah Mourad; Annie Schmidt
- Producers: Britta Lundin (season 1); Lizzie Nastro (season 1); Izabella Tzenkova (season 1); Naima Ramos-Chapman; Ben Snyder
- Cinematography: Jackson Hunt
- Editors: Nico Leunen; Thomas Pooters
- Camera setup: Single-camera
- Running time: 29–31 minutes
- Production companies: A Dreamy Crystal Moselle Sequence...; Arfin Material (season 1); Untitled Entertainment

Original release
- Network: HBO
- Release: May 1, 2020 – July 16, 2021

Betty is an American teen comedy television series created by Crystal Moselle. The series is based on Moselle's 2018 feature film Skate Kitchen, which was in turn based on her 2016 short film That One Day. It includes most of the cast of the original feature film, and focuses on the Gen Z all-girl group's efforts to stand out in New York's predominantly male world of skateboarding. The series premiered on HBO on May 1, 2020. In June 2020, the series was renewed for a second season which premiered on June 11, 2021. In August 2021, the series was canceled after two seasons.

Betty received positive critical reception, and was nominated for a Gotham Award for Shortform Breakthrough Series.

== Plot ==
Betty follows "a tight-knit group of girl skaters and follows their everyday lives as they navigate the male-dominated world of skateboarding. The title comes from the derogatory nickname sometimes thrown at them by men."

== Cast ==
=== Main ===
- Dede Lovelace as Janay, a bold vlogger
- Kabrina Adams as Honeybear, a shy aspiring filmmaker
- Nina Moran as Kirt, a flirtatious ladykiller and a "lovable stoner"
- Ajani Russell as Indigo, a low-level weed dealer from a wealthy family
- Rachelle Vinberg as Camille, a serious skater who tries to fit in with the male skaters

=== Recurring ===
- Caleb Eberhardt as Donald (season 1)
- Edmund Donovan as Bambi (season 1)
- Katerina Tannenbaum as Ash
- Reza Nader as Farouk
- Alexander Cooper as Charlie
- CJ Ortiz as Luis
- Brenn Lorenzo as Ceila (season 1)
- Jules Lorenzo as Yvette (season 1)
- Raekwon Haynes as Philip
- Karim Callender Abdul as Dante (season 1)
- Noa Fisher as Peachy (season 1)
- Kai Espion Monroe as Kai (season 1)
- Lil Dre as Tai
- Andrew Darnell as Sylvester
- Roblé Ali as Jzabel
- Isabel Palma as Shelby
- Rad Pereira as Victoria
- Moises Acevedo as Micah

=== Guest ===
- Ben Sinclair as Biker ("Ladies on Fire")
- Tony Hawk as Skater ("Ladies on Fire")
- Amy Sedaris as Woman on Trail ("Sweet Tooth")
- Gina Gershon as Oracle ("Sweet Tooth")

== Episodes ==
=== Series overview ===
Season	Episodes	Originally released	
Season	Episodes	First released	Last released
1	6	May 1, 2020	June 5, 2020
2	6	June 11, 2021	July 16, 2021

=== Season 1 (2020) ===
No. overall	No. in season	Title	Directed by	Written by	Original release date	U.S. viewers (millions)
1	1	"Key Party"	Crystal Moselle	Crystal Moselle & Lesley Arfin	May 1, 2020	0.158
2	2	"Zen and the Art of Skateboarding"	Crystal Moselle	Patricia Breen	May 8, 2020	0.172
3	3	"Happy Birthday, Tyler"	Crystal Moselle	Moshe Kasher	May 15, 2020	0.048
4	4	"The Tombs"	Crystal Moselle	Britta Lundin	May 22, 2020	0.192
5	5	"Perstephanie"	Crystal Moselle	Naima Ramos-Chapman & Veronica Rodriguez	May 29, 2020	0.148
6	6	"Ladies on Fire"	Crystal Moselle	Lesley Arfin	June 5, 2020	0.172

=== Season 2 (2021) ===
No. overall	No. in season	Title	Directed by	Written by	Original release date	U.S. viewers (millions)
7	1	"Octopussy"	Crystal Moselle	Moshe Kasher	June 11, 2021 (Note: This episode was released early on YouTube on June 4, 2021 for free to watch, prior to its premiere on June 11, 2021, on HBO.)	N/A
8	2	"Blue Is the Warmest Threesome"	Crystal Moselle	Ben Snyder	June 18, 2021	N/A
9	3	"Sugar We're Going Down, Swinging"	Crystal Moselle	Wally Baram & Aida Osman	June 25, 2021	N/A
10	4	"Sweet Tooth"	Crystal Moselle	Crystal Moselle & Rachelle Vinberg	July 2, 2021	N/A
11	5	"Good Luck with That"	Crystal Moselle	Naima Ramos-Chapman	July 9, 2021	N/A
12	6	"The Let Down"	Crystal Moselle	Sabaah Folayan	July 16, 2021	N/A

== Production ==
=== Development ===
On August 14, 2019, it was reported that HBO had given Betty a series order consisting of six episodes. The series is created, directed, executive produced by Crystal Moselle who also co-wrote and directed Skate Kitchen. The series is a spinoff of the film and features many of the same actors, with some tweaks to various storylines. Lesley Arfin, Igor Srubshchik, and Jason Weinberg were executive producers alongside Moselle. Production companies involved with the series are Untitled Entertainment, A Dreamy Crystal Moselle Sequence, and Arfin Material.

The series premiered on May 1, 2020. On June 18, 2020, HBO renewed the series for a second season which premiered on June 11, 2021. On August 24, 2021, HBO canceled the series after two seasons.

=== Casting ===
Alongside the initial series announcement, it was reported that Rachelle Vinberg, Nina Moran, Moonbear, Dede Lovelace, and Ajani Russell would reprise their roles from Skate Kitchen as series regulars. As with the film, the actors play fictionalized versions of themselves.

=== Filming ===
The series was filmed on-location in New York City. The show has no sets.

== Reception ==
=== Critical reception ===
On Rotten Tomatoes, the first season holds an approval rating of 97% based on 30 reviews, with an average rating of 7.15/10. The website's critical consensus reads, "Earnest, audacious, and effortlessly cool, Betty captures the spirit of skating and friendship with style." On Metacritic, it has a weighted average score of 77 out of 100 based on 14 reviews, indicating "generally favorable reviews". Betty was noted by Vogue for depicting the friendships of women, several of them queer or of color, "in a naturalistic way." Ashlie D. Stevens wrote of the series in Salon, ""Betty" isn't fast-paced or bursting with dramatic turns, but therein lies its appeal. This is a show that is about watching a new generation of women empower themselves and the women around them, seemingly in real time." Robert Lloyd of the Los Angeles Times noted while "there is no nudity, that old HBO staple", that a strength of the show is "its main themes are friendship, self-knowledge, identity, equality and freedom...It feels innocent, which is not to say naive. And it is appropriately, almost casually exhilarating."

The New York Times and Time named the first season to end-of-year "best new series" lists.

The second season has a 100% approval rating on Rotten Tomatoes based on 5 reviews, with an average rating of 8/10. On Metacritic, it has a weighted average score of 74 out of 100 based on 7 reviews, indicating "generally favorable reviews".

=== Ratings ===
==== Season 1 ====
Viewership and ratings per episode of Betty
No.	Title	Air date	Rating (18–49)	Viewers (millions)
1	"Key Party"	May 1, 2020	0.03	0.158
2	"Zen and the Art of Skateboarding"	May 8, 2020	0.03	0.172
3	"Happy Birthday, Tyler"	May 15, 2020	0.01	0.048
4	"The Tombs"	May 22, 2020	0.03	0.192
5	"Perstephanie"	May 28, 2020	0.02	0.148
6	"Ladies on Fire"	June 5, 2020	0.04	0.172

=== Awards and nominations ===
Award	Year	Category	Nominee(s)	Result	Ref.
Gotham Independent Film Awards	2020	Breakthrough Series – Short Form	Crystal Moselle, Lesley Arfin, Igor Srubshchik and Jason Weinberg	Nominated	
