= Aslıhan Ünaldı =

Turkish screenwriter and director

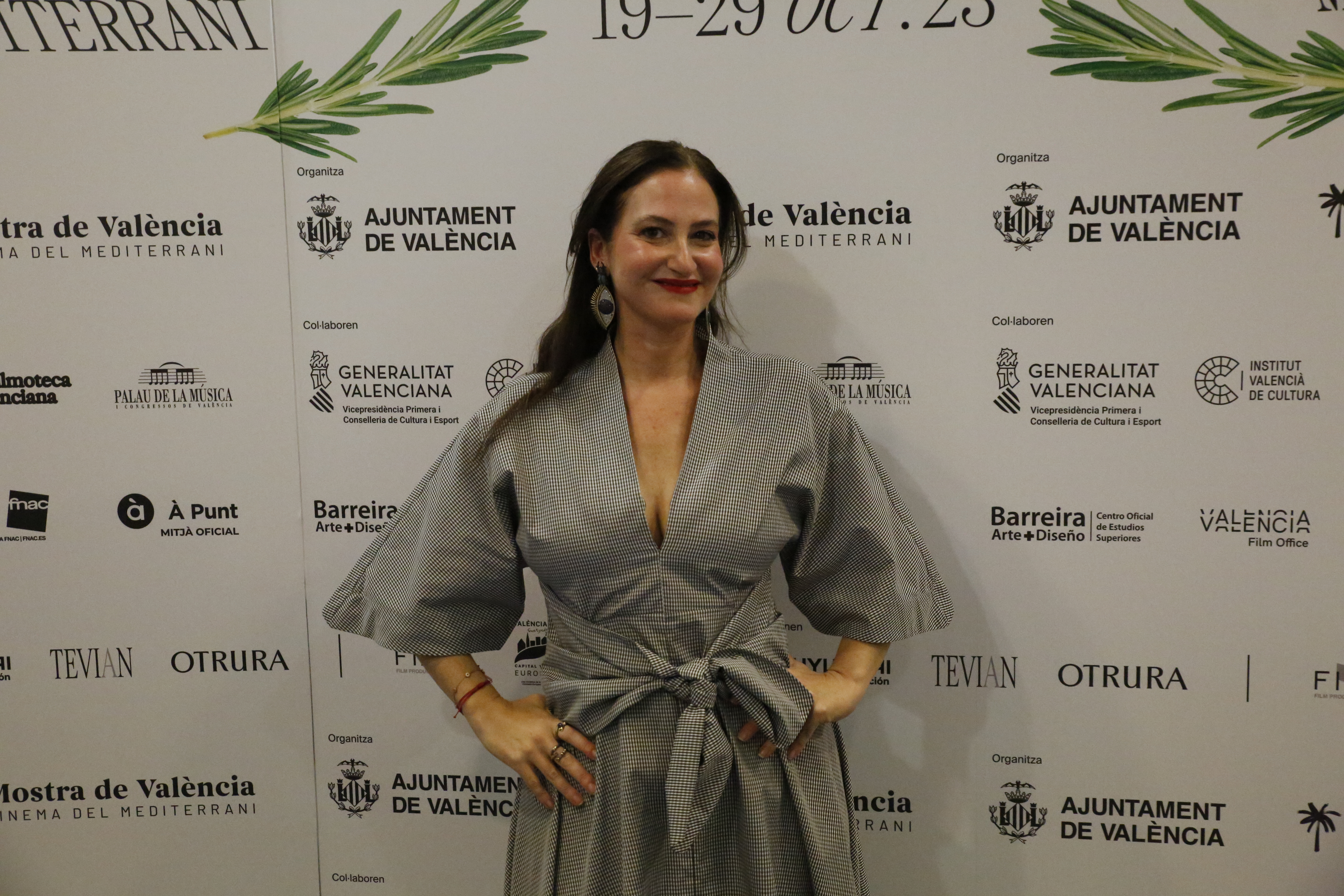
- Aslıhan Ünaldı in the Mostra de València.
- Born: Istanbul
- Education: Yale University; New York University's Tisch School of Arts

Aslıhan Ünaldı is a Turkish cinema screenwriter, director and producer.

Born and raised in Istanbul, Ünaldı has been living in the United States since she was 18 years old. After studying Photography and International Relations at Yale University for her bachelor's degree, she went on to receive her MFA in Film from New York University's acclaimed Tisch School of the Arts.

Ünaldı's first short film, Razan, premiered at the Rotterdam Film Festival in 2006 and went on to screen at dozens of festivals worldwide.

In 2011, Ünaldı premiered her first environmental feature documentary, Overdrive: Istanbul in the New Millennium. In 2023, she premiered her feature film, Suyun Üstü / Afloat, a thriller set in a boat sailing the Aegean Sea.

Ünaldı has also written scripts such as Skate Kitchen, premiered at Sundance in 2018, and Young Wrestlers, premiered at the Berlinale in 2016. In addition, she teaches screenwriting in the graduate film programs of Columbia University and NYU Tisch.
