= Alex Corporan =

American skateboarder

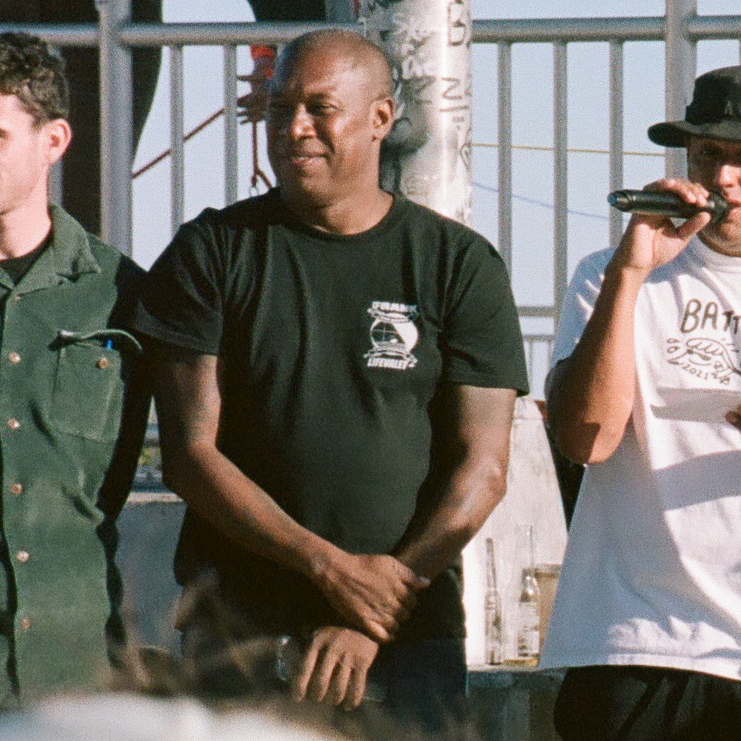
Corporan in 2021 at Battle at the Beach 3, Rockaway, Queens.

Alex Corporan is a Dominican-American professional skateboarder, skateboard industry professional, and event organizer, born and raised in Washington Heights, NYC. Corporan began skateboarding in 1986.

== Skateboarding career ==
Corporan filmed some of NYC’s first ever skate footage, helped grow the skateshop and brand; Supreme, working there as a longtime manager. Corporan made a cameo in Larry Clark's Kids. After Supreme, Corporan worked at Sole Technology, managing the Etnies showroom. He currently manages PR for brands like Rockstar Bearings & El Señor. Corporan has been part of hosting countless skateboarding events throughout his career.

=== Adult Go Skateboarding Day ===
Corporan founded Adult Go Skateboarding Day in 2011, a yearly event thrown in New York City.
