= Lesley Arfin =

American comedy writer and author

- Born: 1979 (age 46–47); Long Island, New York
- Occupations: Comedy writer Author
- Spouse: Paul Rust (m. 2015)
- Children: 1

Lesley Arfin (born 1979) is an American comedy writer and author.

== Early life and education ==
Arfin was born in 1979 on Long Island, New York to a Jewish family. She grew up in the same residential complex in Woodbury, Nassau County, New York, as writer Gabe Rotter and they both attended Syosset High School. She attended Hampshire College.

== Career ==
Arfin contributed to Vice beginning in 2001, and left in 2007, following the publication of her book Dear Diary, based on a column she wrote for Vice magazine and published by Vice Books. In 2008, she became editor-in-chief of Missbehave.

She later worked as a staff writer on the HBO TV series Girls. She also wrote for the TV series Brooklyn Nine-Nine, receiving sole writing credit for a Halloween-themed episode in its first season.

Together with Paul Rust and Judd Apatow, she co-created the Netflix series Love. In developing the series, she drew on her own experiences with alcohol addiction.

Arfin has hosted the Earios podcast Filling the Void, which focuses on hobbies that bring people joy. She also wrote and executive produced the first season of the HBO series Betty, released in 2020.

== Personal life ==
In Dear Diary, Arfin wrote about her past heroin addiction and experiences in rehabilitation.

She married actor and writer Paul Rust in 2015. In October 2017, she gave birth to their daughter, Mary James.

In 2024, Arfin was criticised for posts she made on Reddit regarding the Gaza war.

== Bibliography ==
- Dear Diary, ISBN 978-1-57687-383-0
