= Women's Tales =

Series of short films by Miu Miu

Women's Tales is an ongoing short film anthology series created by fashion brand Miu Miu. Aside from the stipulation that the films use Miu Miu clothing the all female directors are given free rein to create their films. Miu Miu has commissioned two films a year since 2011, one for their summer collection and one for the winter collection.

Since 2012, all of the winter collection films have had their world premiere at the Venice Days section of the Venice International Film Festival. The summer collection films, which typically premiere during the New York Fashion Week in February, are shown there as well. Miu Miu is a so-called "creative partner", i.e. sponsor, of Venice Days.

== History ==
The first film, Zoe Cassavetes' The Powder Room premiered online in late January 2011. The series' second installment, Lucrecia Martel's Muta, premiered at an invitation-only screening at a Beverly Hills mansion and online in July 2011.

In February 2012, the third film, Giada Colagrande's The Woman Dress, was screened during the New York Fashion Week and made available online. Massy Tadjedin's It's Getting Late, number four in the series, had its world premiere at the Venice Days sidebar of the 69th Venice International Film Festival where all four films from the series were screened together for the first time.

The fifth film, Ava DuVernay's The Door, premiered online in February 2013. The film was later shown at the 70th Venice International Film Festival along with Le donne della Vucciria by Palestinian actress and director Hiam Abbas.

In 2015, Agnès Varda's film Les 3 boutons premiered at the 72nd Venice International Film Festival.

In 2020 Miu Miu offered limited edition t-shirts printed with still from the films.

== Films ==
No.	Director	Title	Year
1	Zoe Cassavetes	The Powder Room	2011
2	Lucrecia Martel	Muta	2011
3	Giada Colagrande	The Woman Dress	2012
4	Massy Tadjedin	It's Getting Late	2012
5	Ava DuVernay	The Door	2013
6	Hiam Abbass	Le donne della Vucciria	2013
7	So Yong Kim	Spark & Light	2014
8	Miranda July	Somebody	2014
9	Alice Rohrwacher	De Djess	2015
10	Agnès Varda	Les 3 boutons	2015
11	Naomi Kawase	Seed	2016
12	Crystal Moselle	That One Day	2016
13	Chloë Sevigny	Carmen	2017
14	Celia Rowlson-Hall	(The [End) of History Illusion]	2017
15	Dakota Fanning	Hello Apartment	2018
16	Haifaa Al-Mansour	The Wedding Singer's Daughter	2018
17	Hailey Gates	Shako Mako	2019
18	Lynne Ramsay	Brigitte	2019
19	Małgorzata Szumowska	Nightwalk	2020
20	Mati Diop	In My Room	2020
21	Isabel Sandoval	Shangri-La	2021
22	Kaouther Ben Hania	I and the Stupid Boy	2021
23	Janicza Bravo	House Comes with a Bird	2022
24	Carla Simón	Letter to My Mother for My Son	2022
25	Lila Avilés	Eye Two Times Mouth	2023
26	Antoneta Alamat Kusijanović	Stane	2023
27	Tan Chui Mui	I Am the Beauty of Your Beauty, I Am the Fear of Your Fear	2024
28	Laura Citarella	The Miu Miu Affaire	2024
29	Joanna Hogg	Autobiografia di una Borsetta	2025
30	Alice Diop	Fragments for Venus	2025
31	Mona Fastvold	Discipline	2026
32	Claire Denis	Avec Kim	2026
