= Dede Lovelace =

Actress, skateboarder, and artists

Dede Lovelace is an American actress, skateboarder, visual artist, and DJ. Lovelace made her acting debut in That One Day (2016). Lovelace played Janay in the 2018 film Skate Kitchen, and most recently played Janay in the 2020 HBO television series adaptation Betty.
