= Golconda Skate Park =

Skatepark in Brooklyn, New York

- Fat Kid; Fat Kid Spot
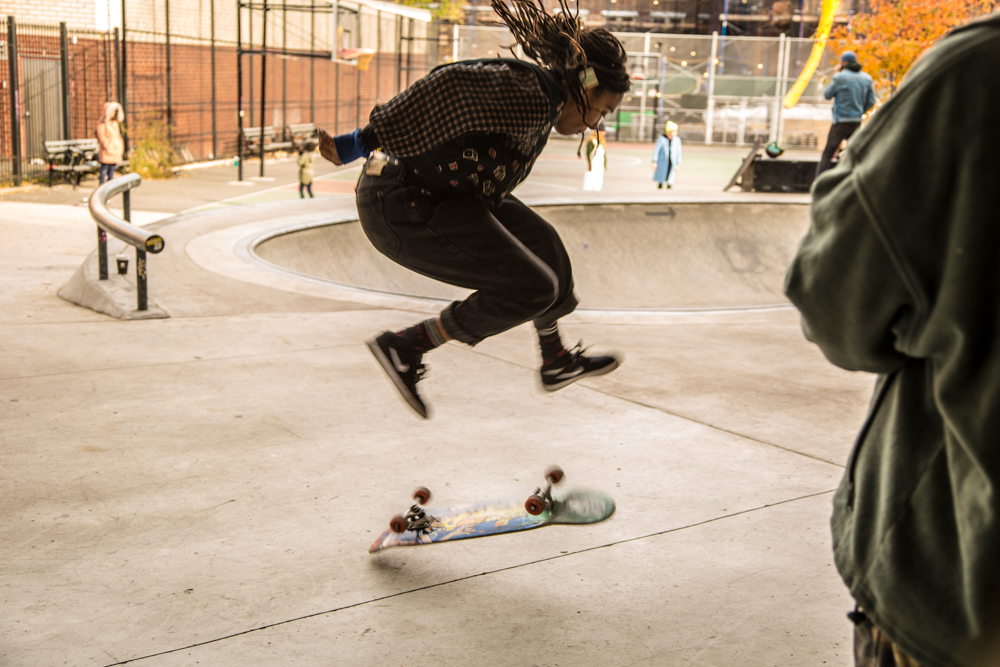
- Interactive map of Golconda Skate Park
- Type: Skate park
- Location: Downtown Brooklyn
- Coordinates: 40.6977°N 73.9819°W
- Area: 18,000 ft^{2} (1,700 m^{2})
- Created: New York City Department of Parks and Recreation
- Established: 2016
- Open: All year
- Terrain: Concrete, Brick
- Public transit: New York City Subway: trains to York Street

Golconda Skate Park, known as Fat Kid, is a public skate park in the Downtown Brooklyn/Fort Greene neighborhoods of Brooklyn, New York City, that originated as a DIY skate spot. Built under the Brooklyn Queens Expressway, the 18,000 square foot professionally built skate park was completed in 2016 and sits within Golconda Playground.

== History ==
Located under the Brooklyn Queens Expressway, the park originated as a D.I.Y skate park known as Fat Kid or the Fat Kid spot. In 2013, work began on a 3.7 million dollar redesign of Golconda playground which included a redesign of the old D.I.Y skate park into a public skate park that flows with the design of the entire park. In 2016, the New York City Parks Department opened a remodeled Golconda Playground, including a redesigned skatepark. Steve Rodriguez worked with the Parks Department and the skating community to advise the design of the skate park.

Starting in early 2019, the NYC Skateboard Coalition, working with the New York City Department of Parks and Recreation, hosts monthly clean-ups at Golconda to mitigate the debris that build up in the park. In November 2019, the Pablo Ramirez foundation joined the NYC Skateboard Coalition to co-host a clean-up and skate session in support of the foundation's Brooklyn Skate Garden project. Also in November 2019, the NYC Skateboard Coalition installed a lock box for brooms and other tools to be stored in an accessible place at Golconda for park locals to clean the skatepark themselves.

=== Fat Kid Spot original name ===
The DIY skate spot that became Golconda Skate Park got its original name, Fat Kid Spot, because of its low-impact obstacles, which were relatively close to the ground. Hence, the obstacles were easier to do for "fatter" people.

=== Etymology of Golconda ===
The name “Golconda” is a portmanteau of GOLd, CONcord and anaconDA, because the park is shaped like a snake. The park sits on Gold and Concord Streets. Golconda can also mean a "place or thing full of riches" (based on the name of a historical city).

== Gallery ==
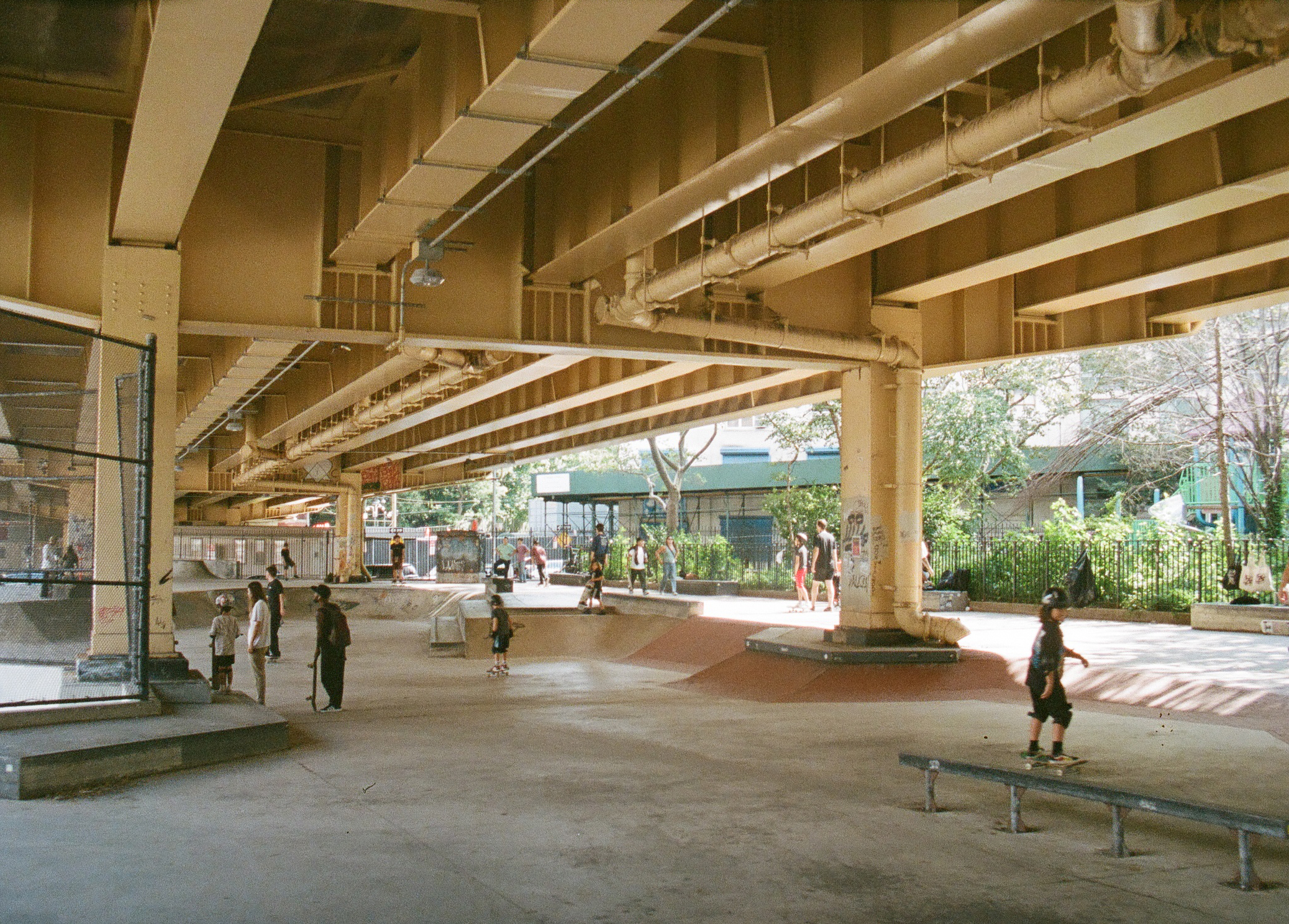

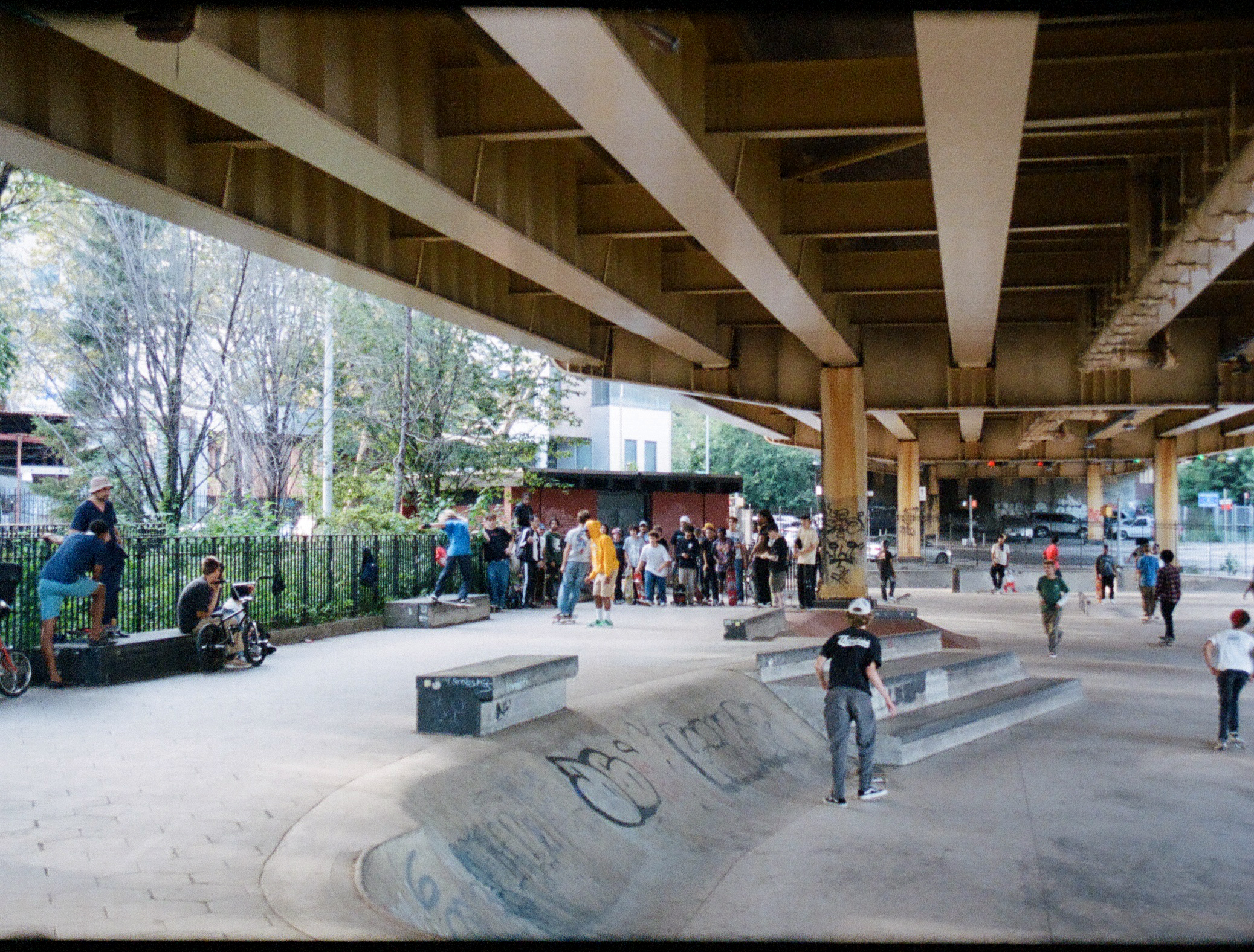

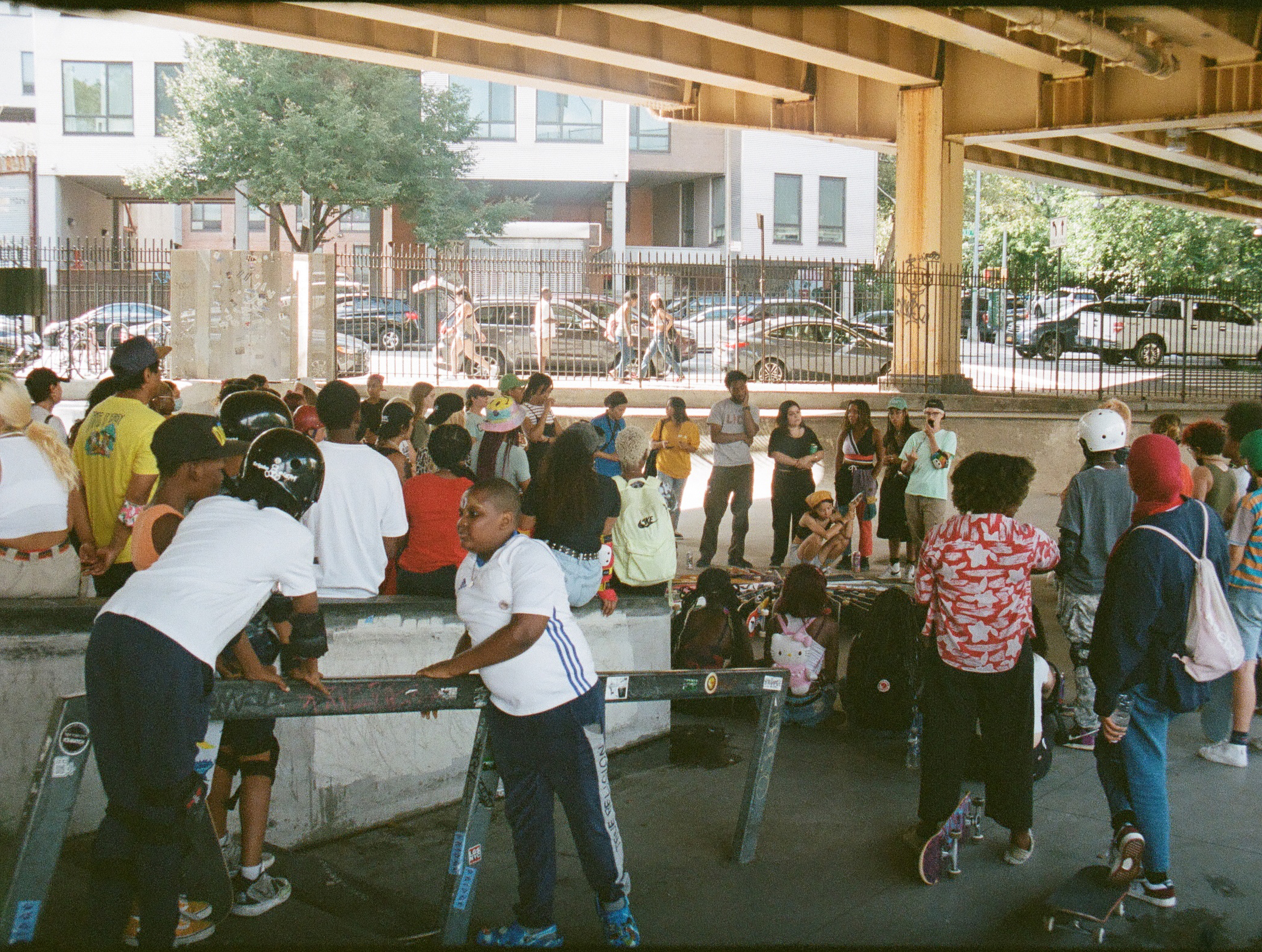

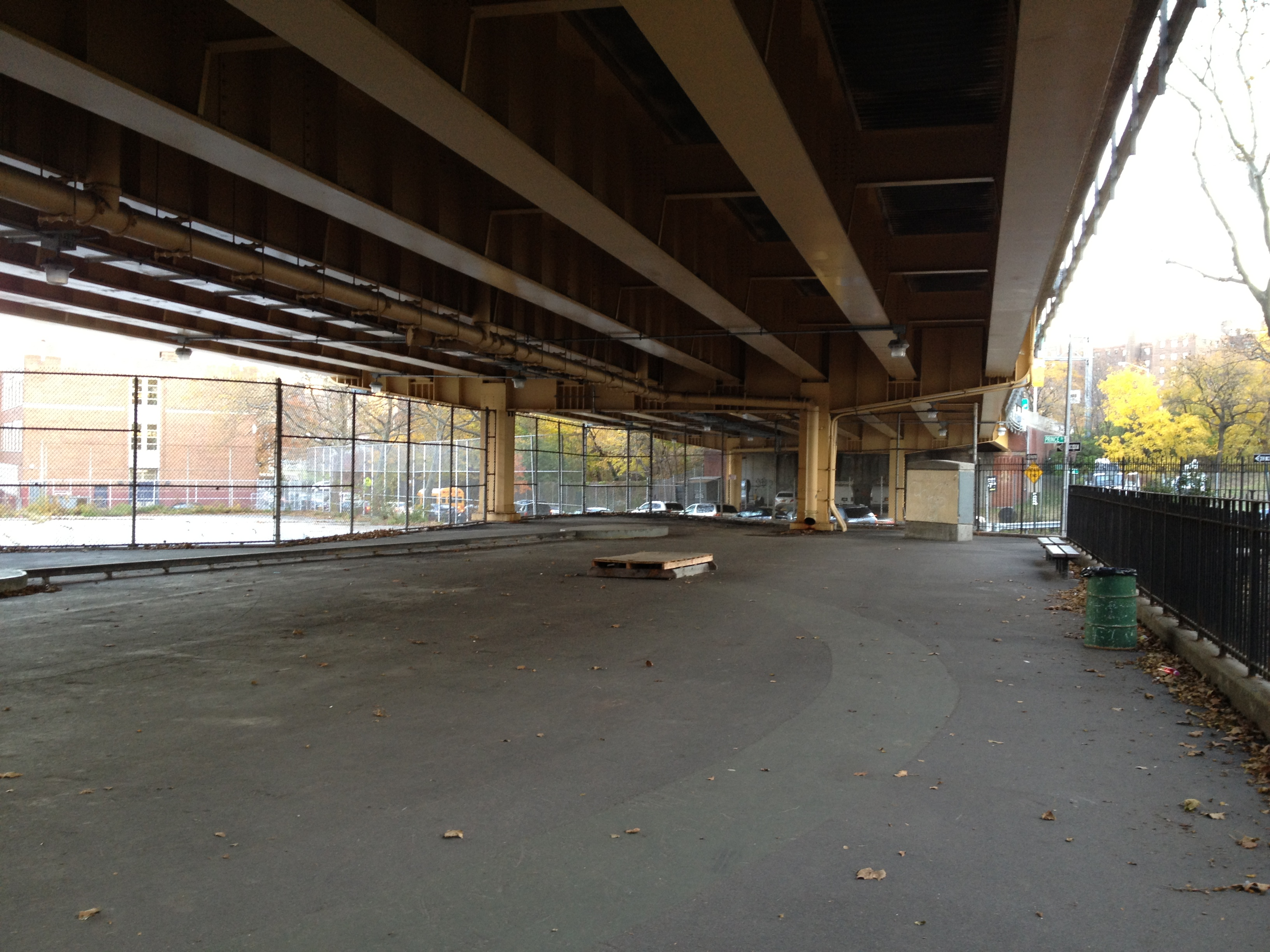

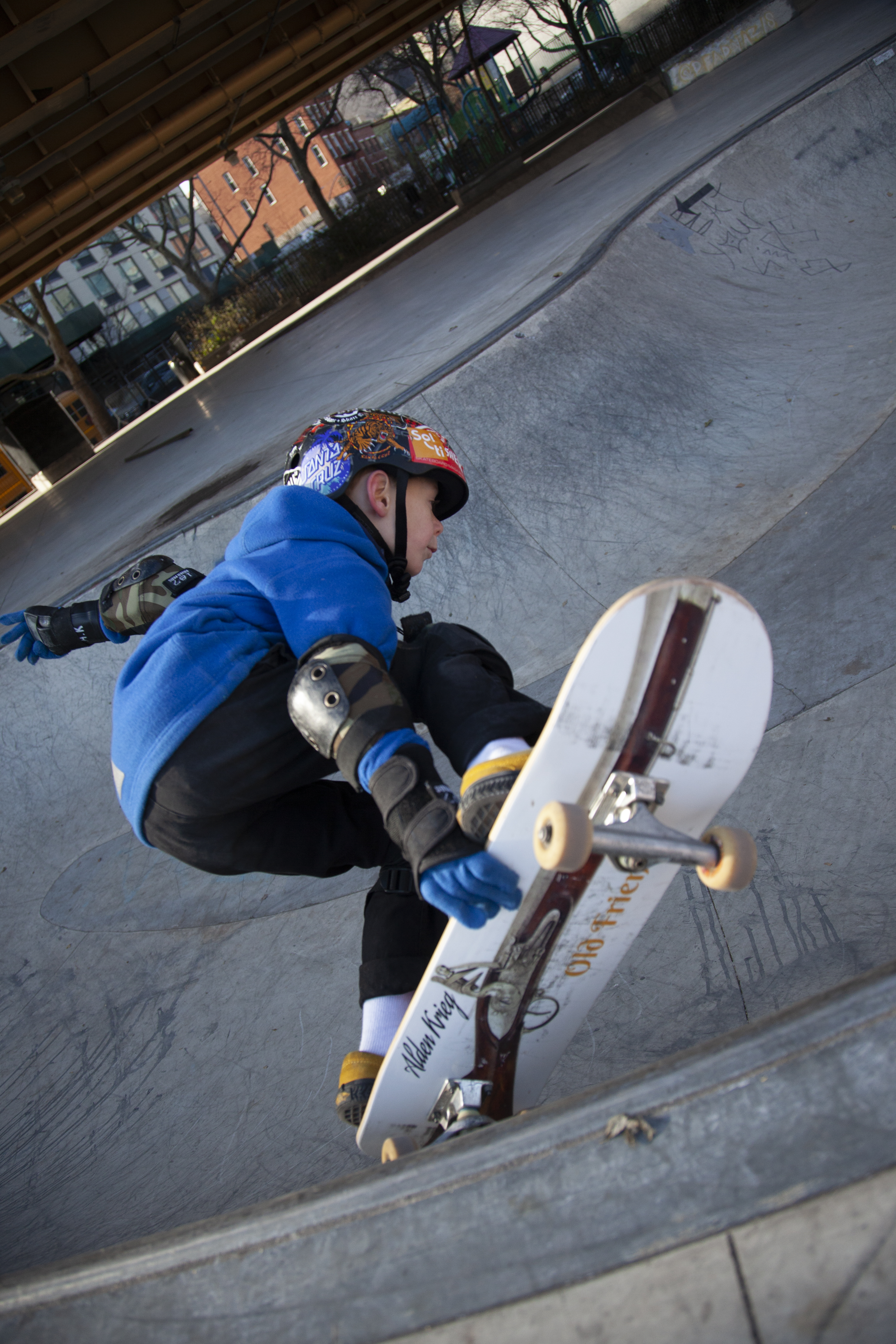

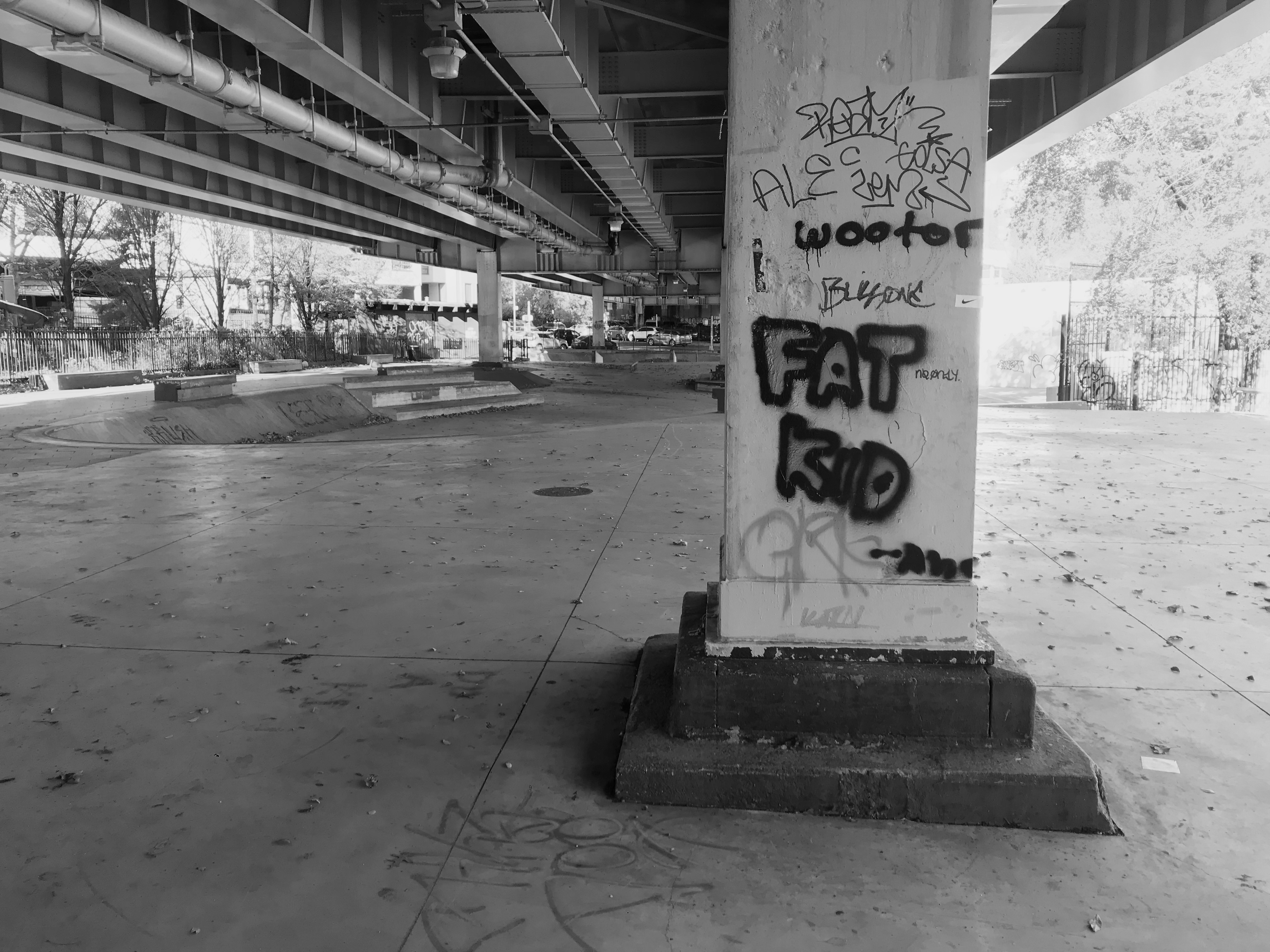

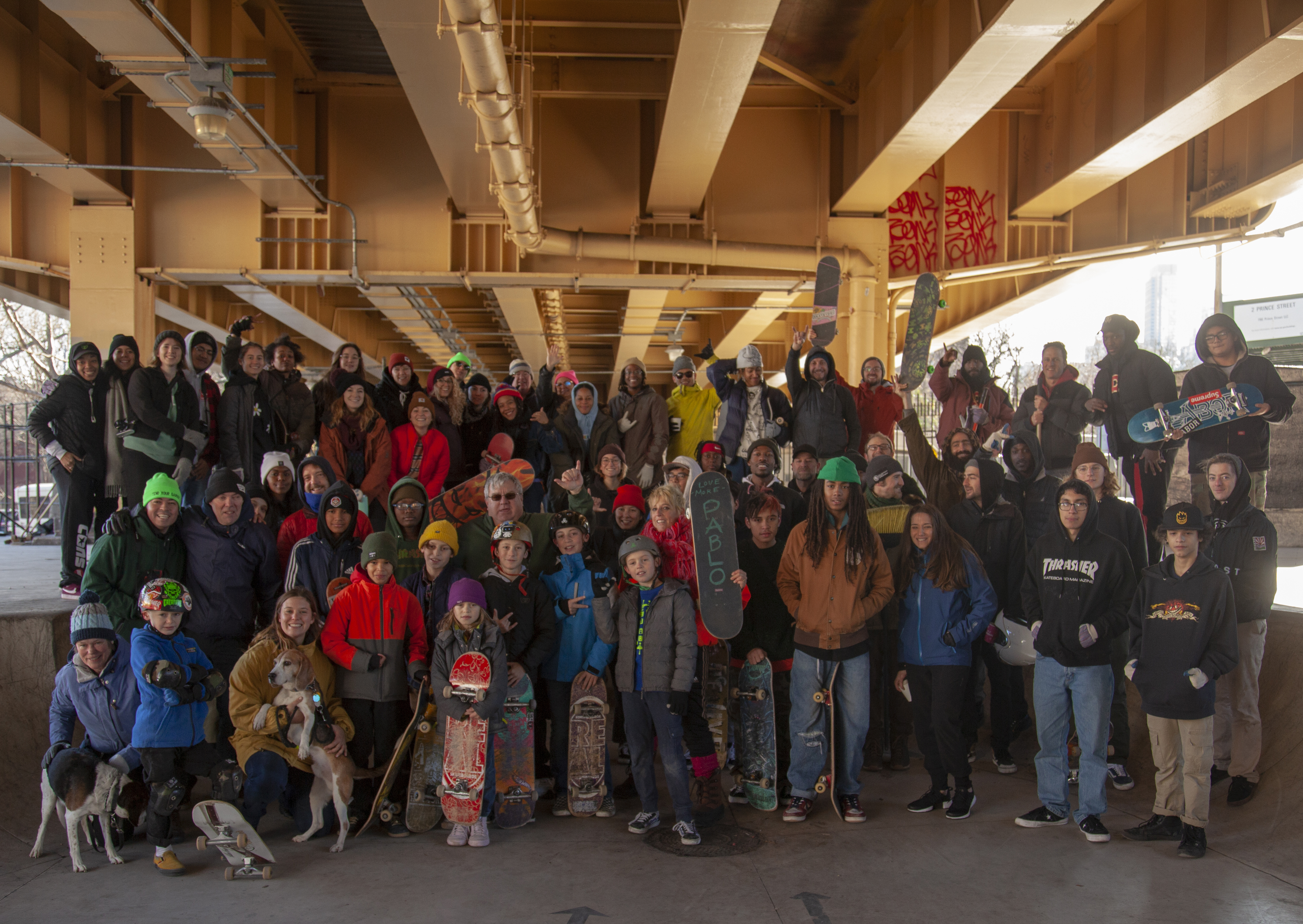

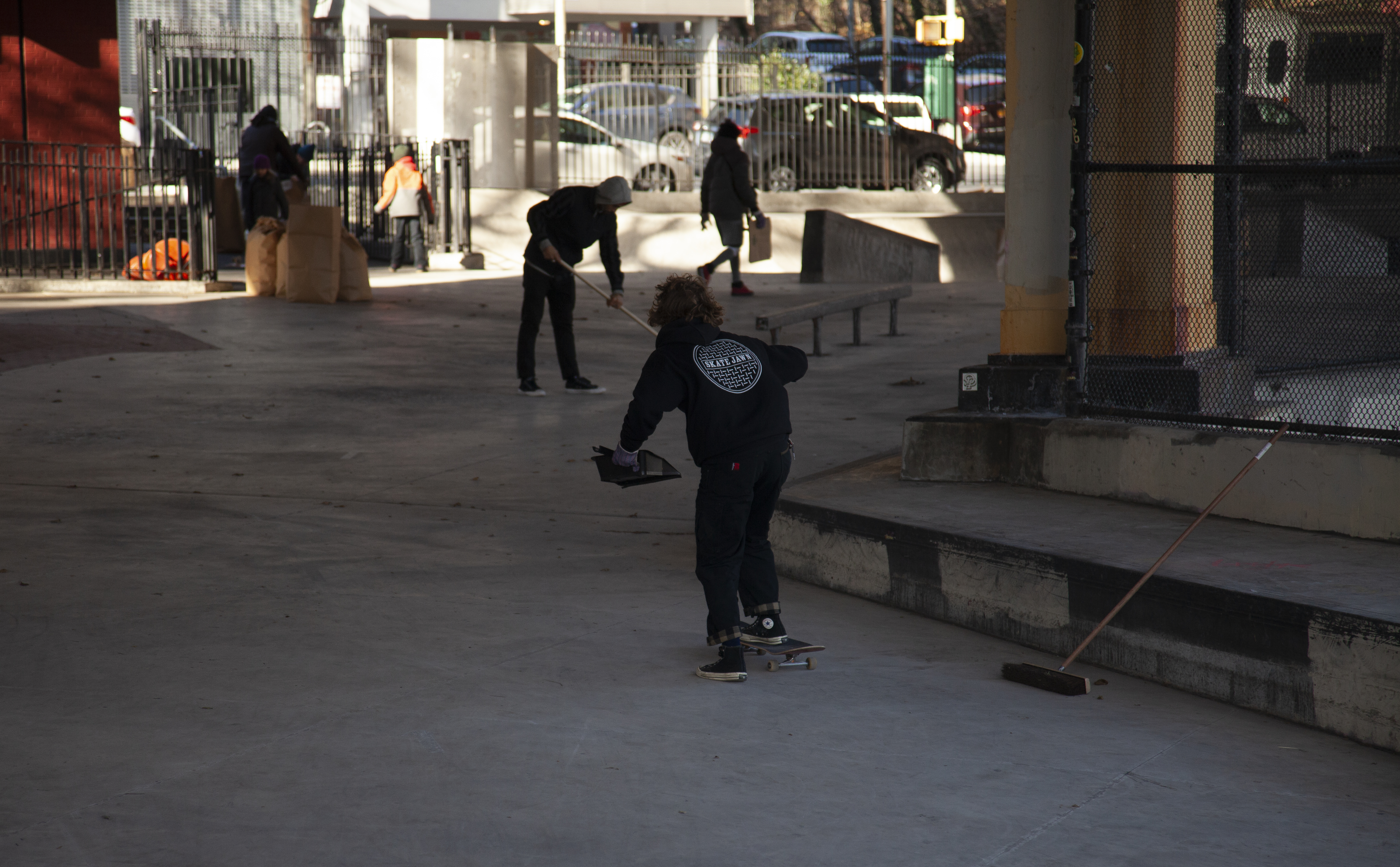

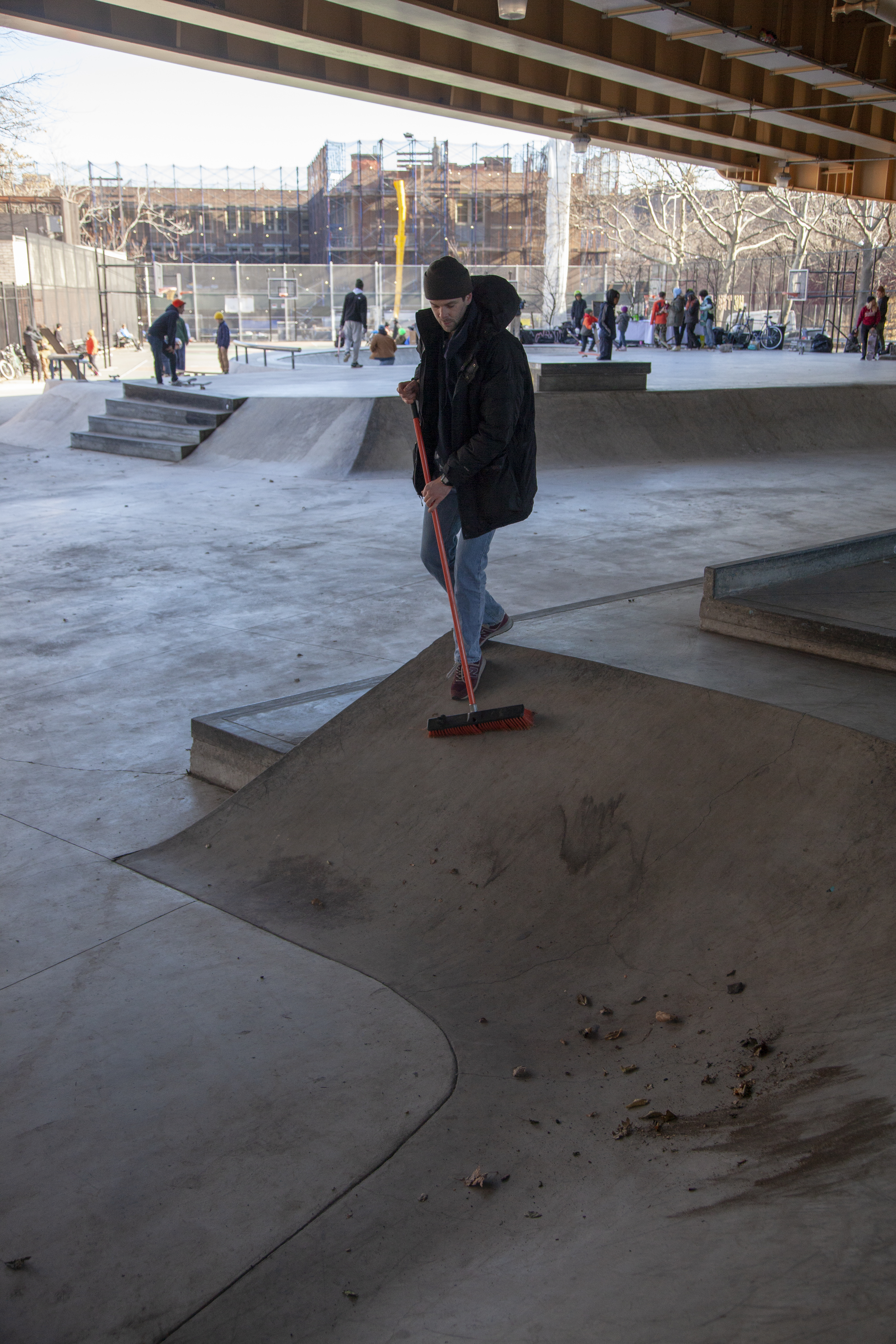

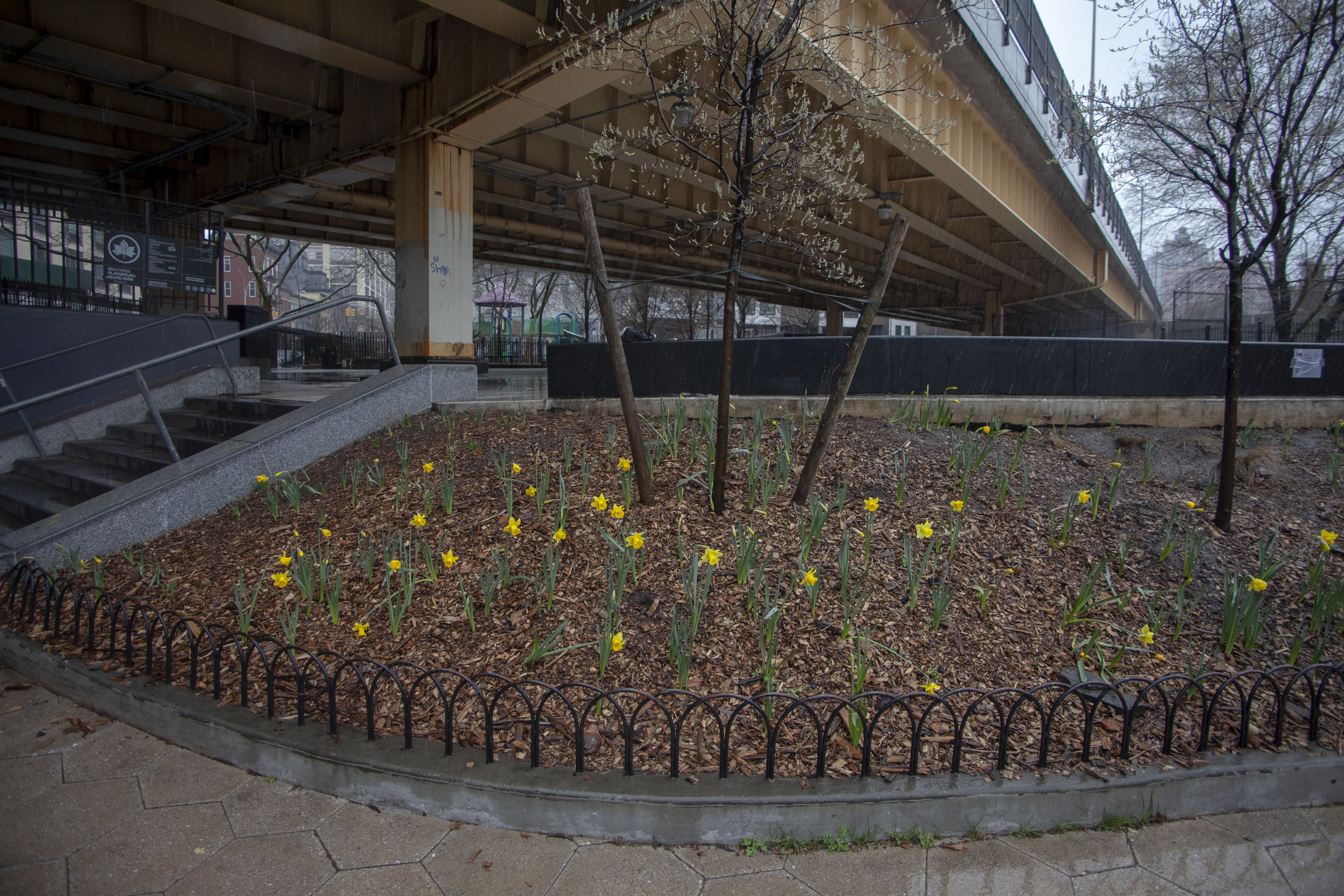

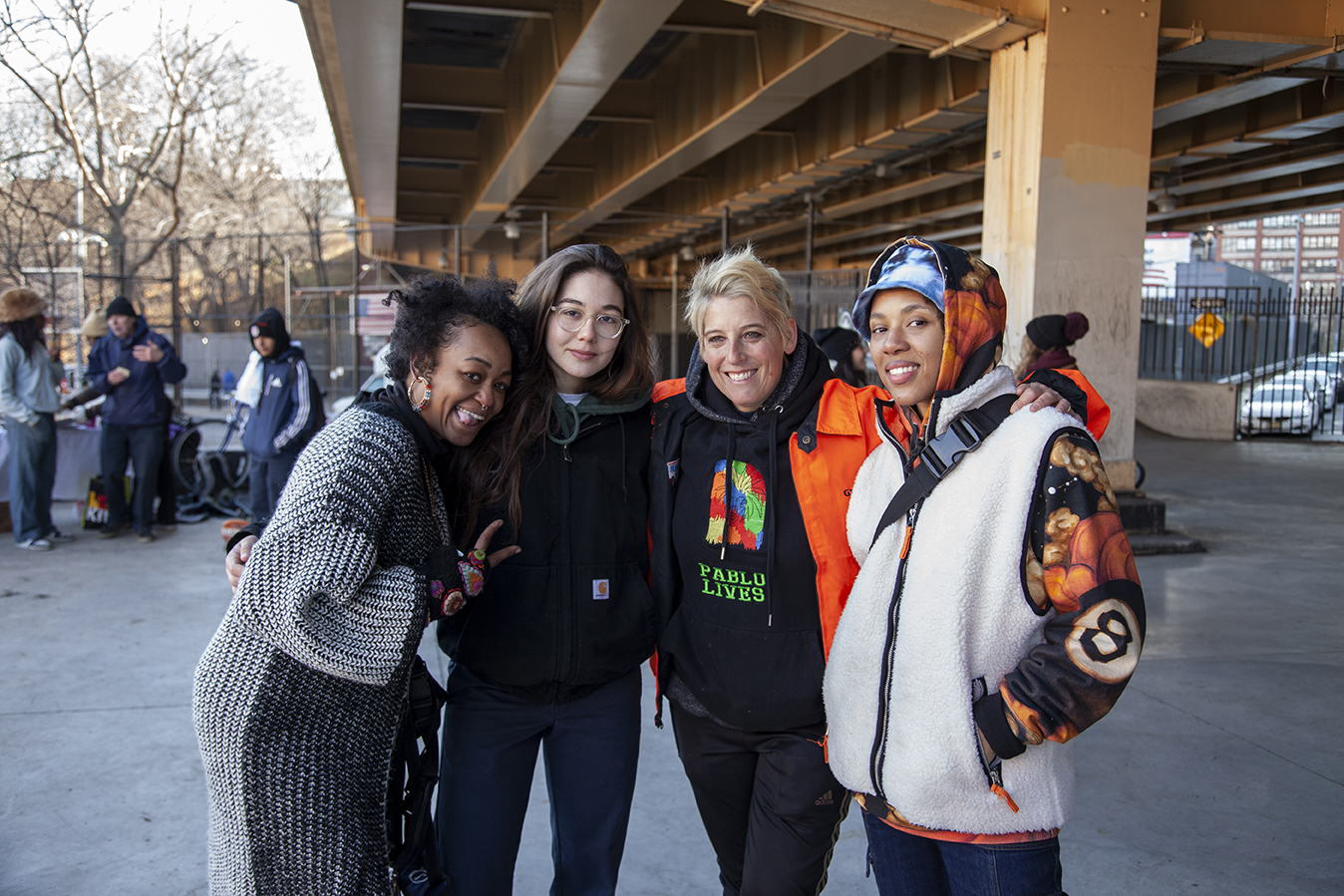

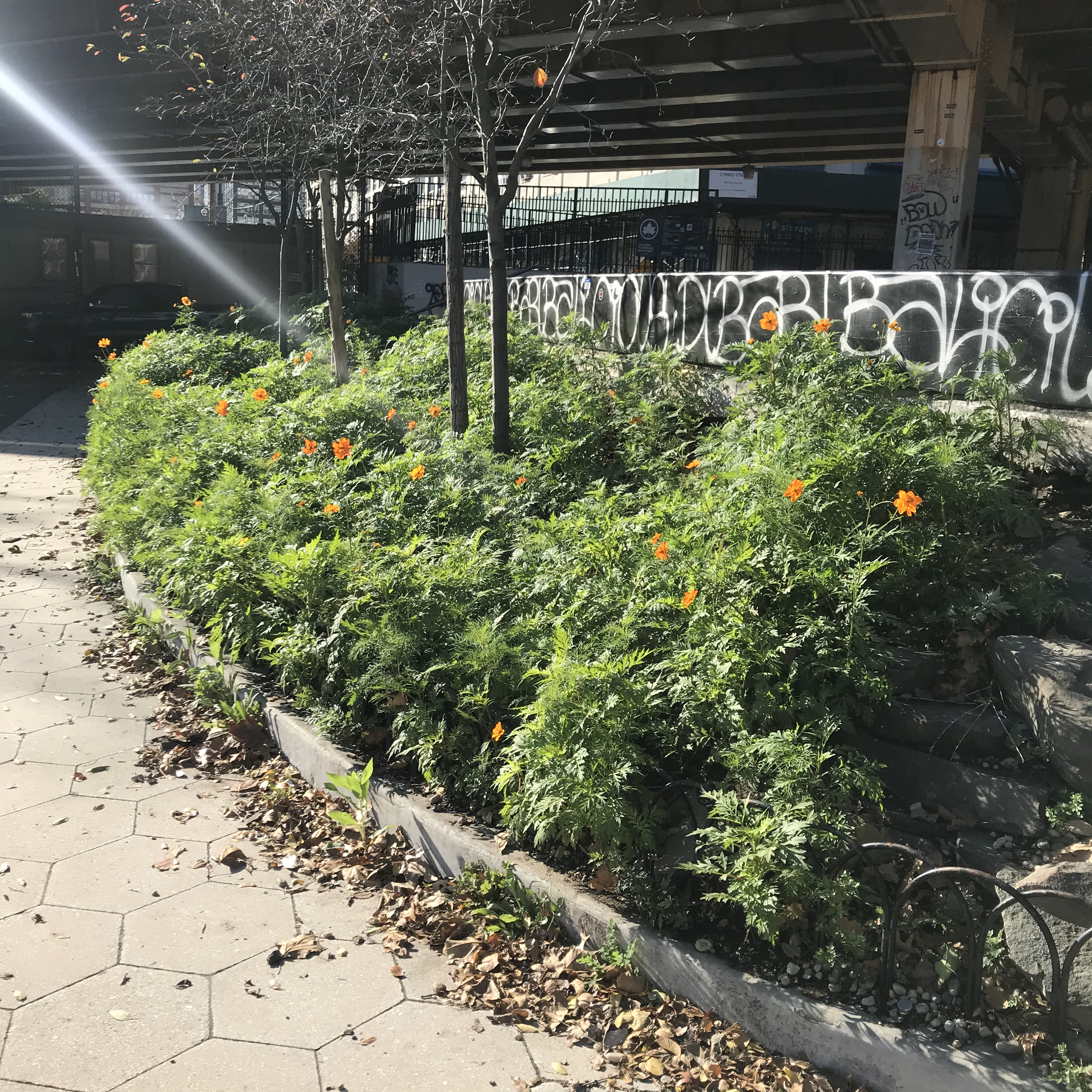

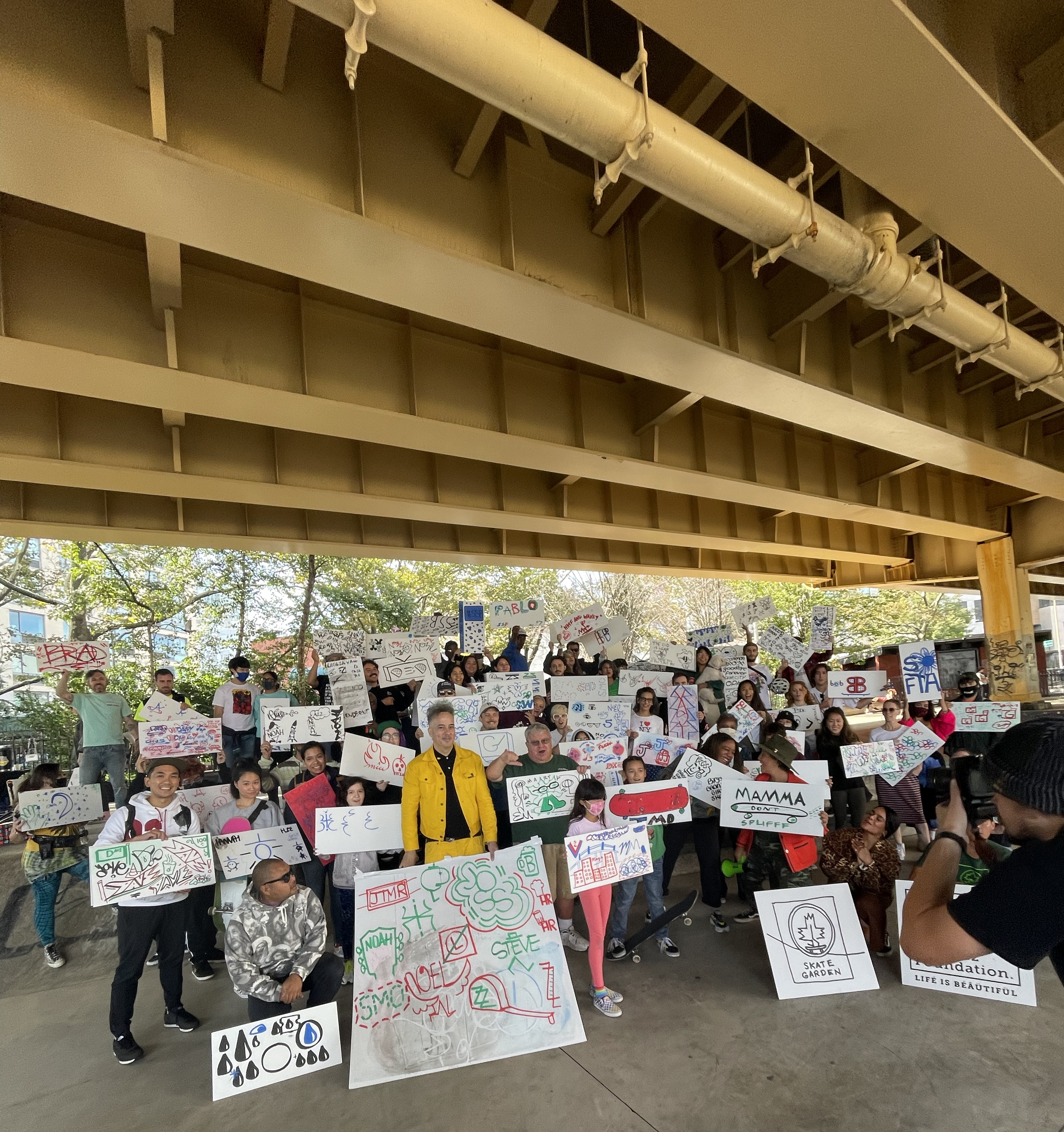
