= Crystal Moselle =

American filmmaker (born 1980)

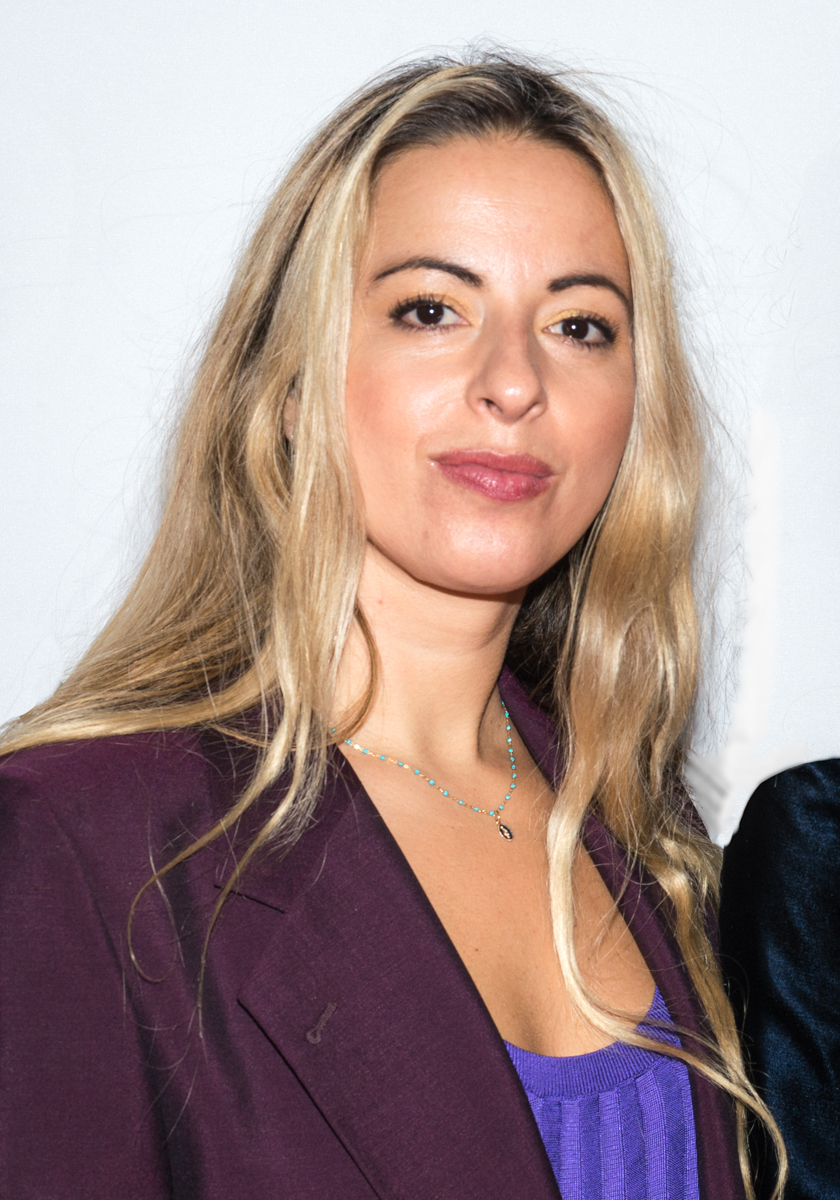
- Moselle at the 2018 Stockholm International Film Festival
- Born: Sierra Ditson Moselle; August 1, 1980 (age 45); San Francisco, California, U.S.
- Education: School of Visual Arts
- Occupation: Director
- Years active: 2002–present
- Website: crystalmoselle.com

Sierra Ditson "Crystal" Moselle (born August 1, 1980) is an American filmmaker. Her debut film was The Wolfpack (2015), a documentary on the Angulo brothers. She has also made That One Day (2016) and Skate Kitchen (2018).

== Early life ==
Born Sierra Ditson Moselle, in San Francisco, she attended Tamalpais High School in Mill Valley, California, graduating in 1998. She graduated from the School of Visual Arts in New York City.

Eugene Kotlyarenko: "What’s your real name?" Moselle: "Sierra. But when I was five, I changed it...I wanted to change it because the first letter of the name was S, and I didn’t like being towards the back of the class. And C was not the very front, but closer to the front."

== Career ==
In 2010 Moselle was walking around New York City, where she worked and lived, when she was struck by six brothers with an unusual appearance. Introducing herself to them she began bonding over their shared love of movies. She began filming them and after a year learned that they had spent the majority of their lives stuck in a small four bedroom apartment due to their abusive father's paranoia of the outside world. Moselle completed her documentary on the brothers, entitled The Wolfpack in 2015. The film premiered at the 2015 Sundance Film Festival where it won the Documentary Grand Jury Prize.

In 2016 Moselle was approached by Miu Miu to direct a short for their Women's Tales series in which female directors were given carte blanche to make short films as long as they featured Miu Miu clothing. Moselle, who had been collaborating with teenage skater girls she had met in a park, decided to film them for her short That One Day. The short premiered at the 73rd Venice International Film Festival.

Moselle used many of the same actors she filmed for That One Day in her 2018 film Skate Kitchen. The film premiered at the 2018 Sundance Film Festival.

In 2020, Moselle served as writer, director, and executive producer of Betty, an HBO series based upon Skate Kitchen.

== Filmography ==
- The Wolfpack (2015)
- That One Day (2016)
- Skate Kitchen (2018)
- Betty (2020–2021)
- My Robot Sophia (2022)
- The Black Sea (2024)
