= Coleman Playground =

Public park in Manhattan, New York

- Harold Hunter Skate Park; Coleman Square; Chinatown Skatepark; LES Skatepark
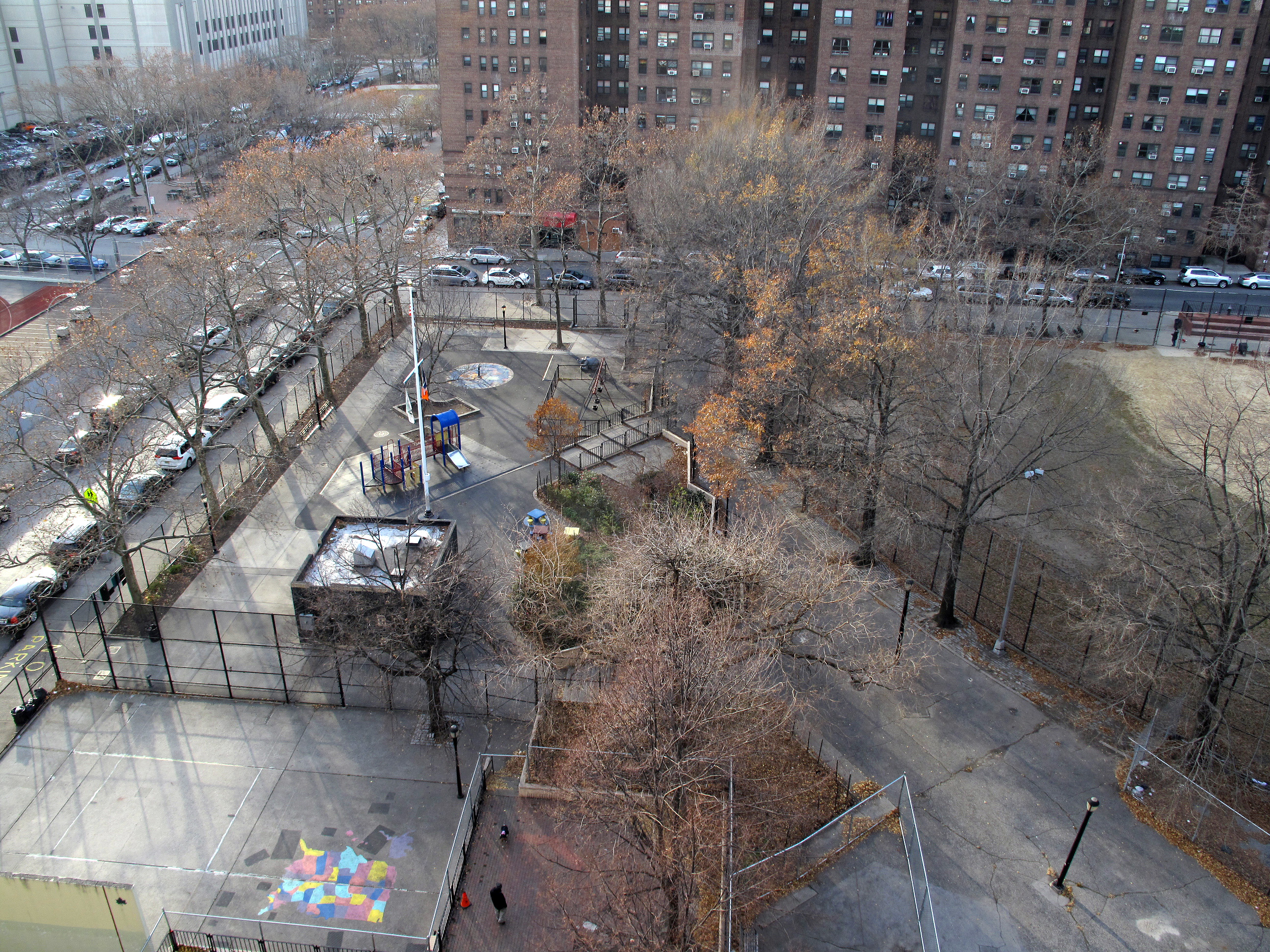
- Coleman Playground in 2012
- Interactive map of Coleman Playground
- Type: Urban park
- Location: Lower East Side, Manhattan
- Nearest city: New York City
- Coordinates: 40.7112°N 73.9937°W
- Created: New York City Department of Parks and Recreation
- Open: All year
- Terrain: Concrete
- Public transit: Q, F, D Trains

Coleman Playground is a public park on the border between the Chinatown and Lower East Side neighborhoods of Manhattan in New York City.

== History ==
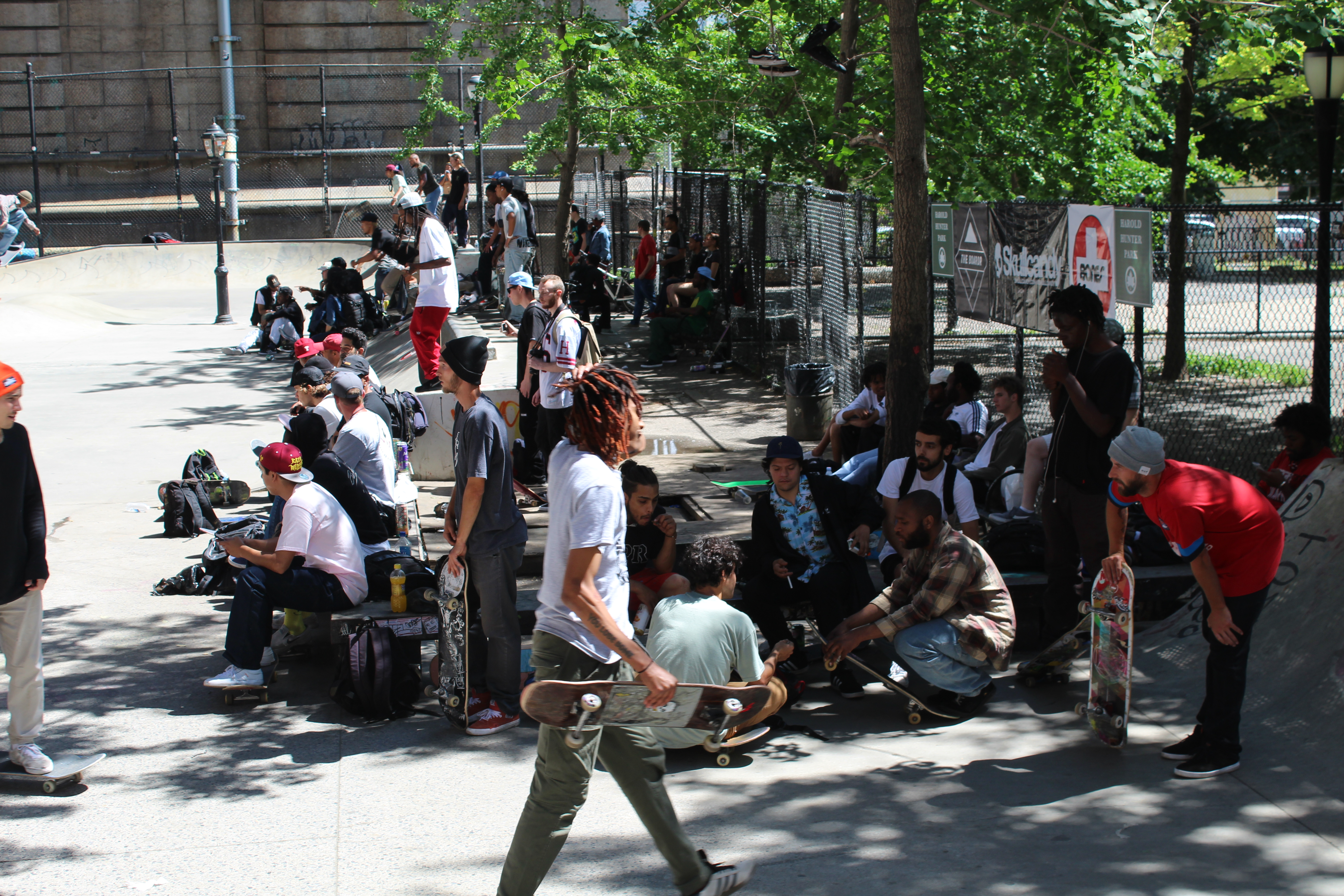
New York City Skateboarders At Harold Hunter Park - 2017

The park is named in honor of a U.S. Army corporal, Joseph Francis Coleman, who died in 1919. Before World War I, the Coleman family lived nearby on Madison Street. Coleman fought in France as a member of the 321st Field Artillery, the 82nd Division of the American Expeditionary Force (AEF). Coleman died on June 16, 1919, at Base Hospital in Hoboken, New Jersey, after contracting tuberculosis in the trenches. Exactly six months after Coleman's death, the Board of Aldermen named this playground in his honor.

== LES Skatepark ==
Under the bridge, Coleman Playground features a skatepark officially called the Coleman Playground Skatepark but often referred to as the LES Skatepark, LES Park, Coleman Square Skatepark, or Chinatown Skatepark. The park began as a DIY spot on old abandoned basketball courts, with the only obstacle being the double stair set that still exists today. In the early 2000s, the city installed pre-fab obstacles to mixed reviews. The locals skaters including Steve Rodriguez received a grant from the Tony Hawk Foundation to fix up the obstacles. The LES skatepark went through a complete concrete remodeled in 2012 and now features ledges, jumps, rails and a pyramid. This skate park is unsupervised. No bikes are allowed; inline skates are permitted.

The 2012 redesign was led by Rodriguez with funding from Nike SB. In 2017, the artist Barbara Kruger created an installation at the park which featured Kruger's signature bold text on ramps, rails, and walls with slogans like “WANT IT. NEED IT. BUY IT.” and “THE GLOBE SHRINKS FOR THOSE WHO OWN IT.” The installation is no longer visible.

In 2019, Steve Rodriguez and Adidas Skateboarding hosted a Go Skateboarding Day event at the park. The following day Rodriguez and Red Bull Skate hosted a best trick contest at the park with Jamie Foy.

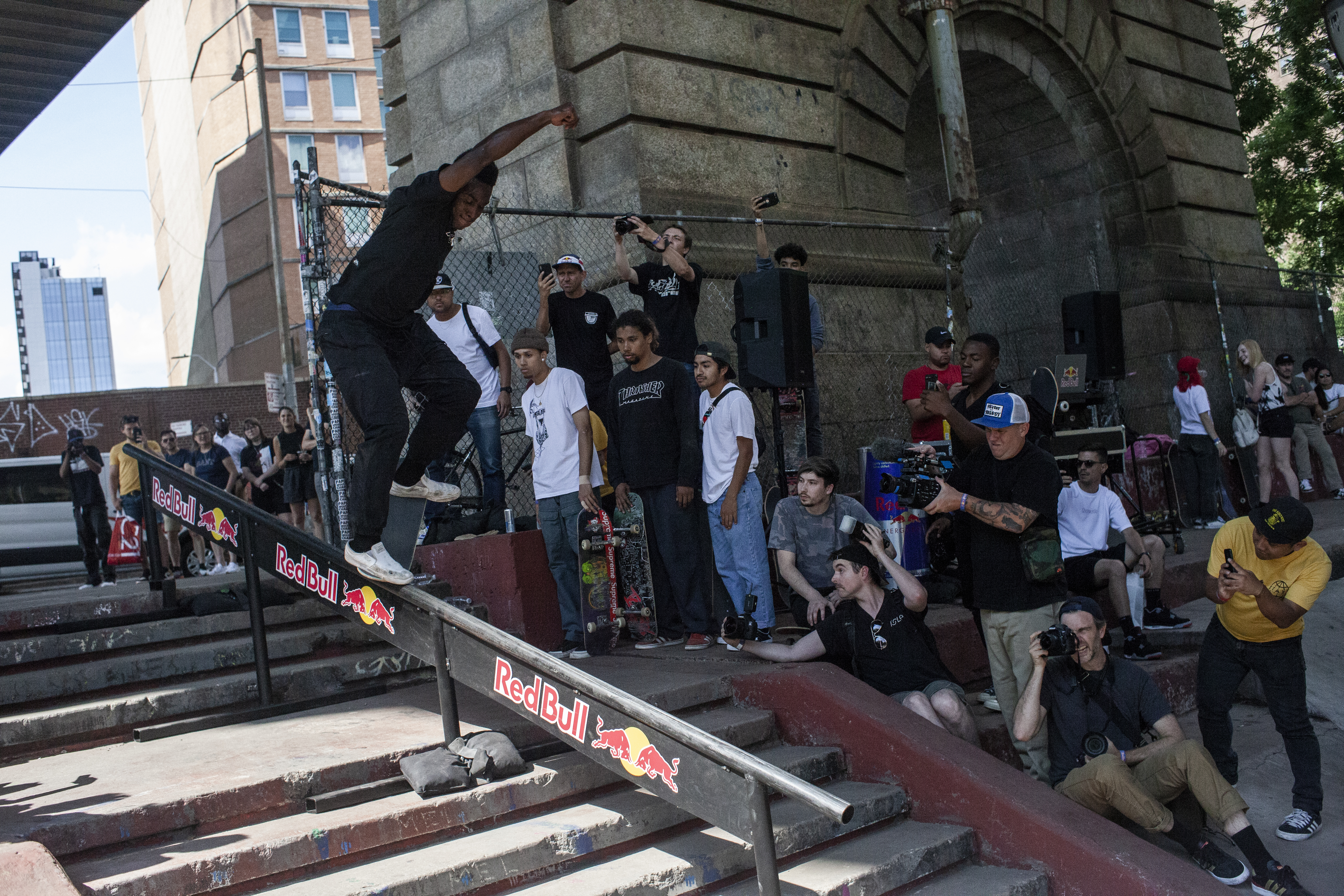
Kevin Godette backside crooked grind at the LES skatepark

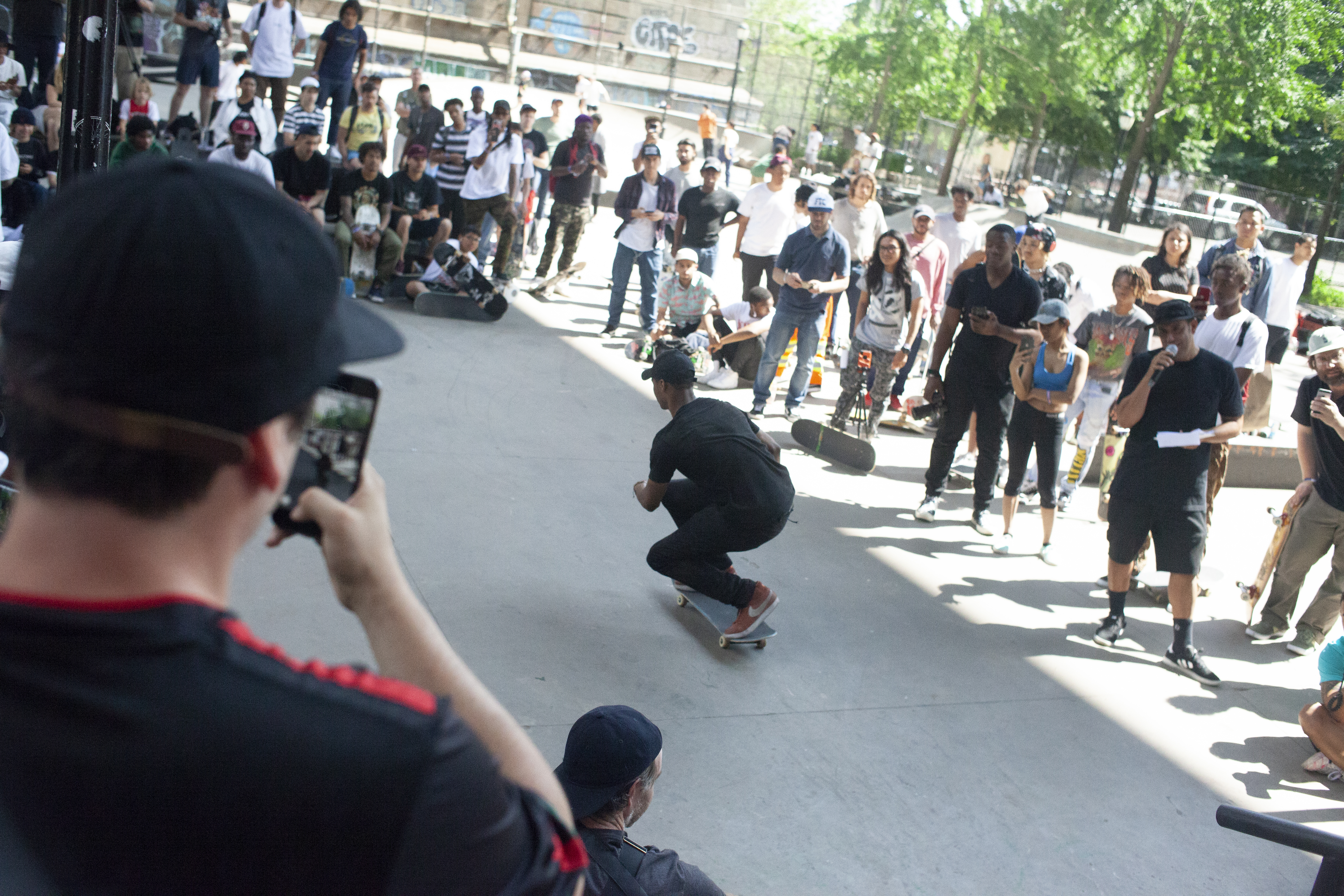
Andre Beverly rolls away after landing a trick at LES skatepark

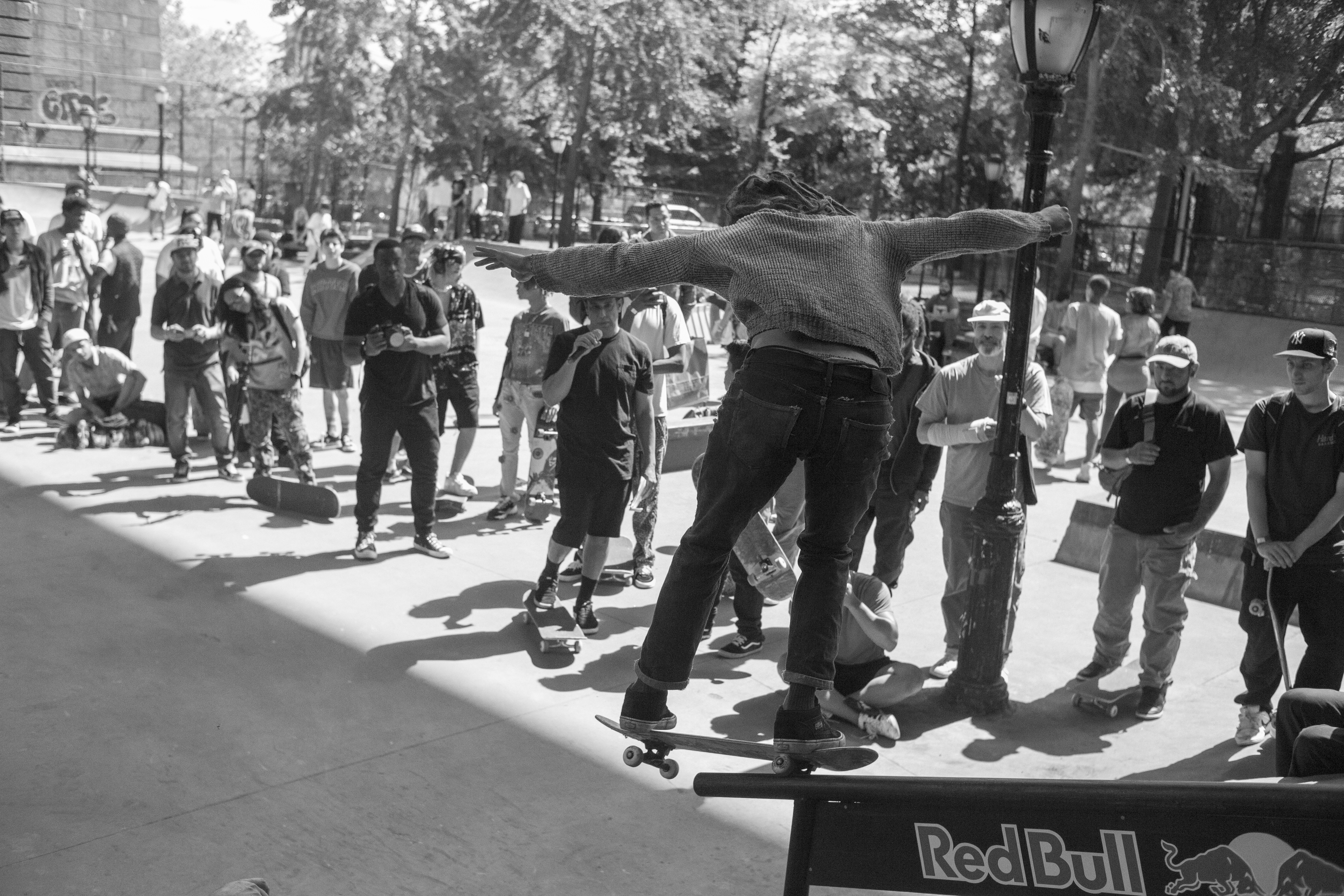
Skateboarder Yaje Popson lands a smooth and steezy backside 50–50 at LES skatepark
