= Baychester, Bronx =

Neighborhood in New York City

Baychester
- Neighborhood of the Bronx
- Interactive map of Baychester
- Coordinates: 40.87°N 73.835°W
- Country: United States
- State: New York
- City: New York City
- Borough: The Bronx
- Community District: The Bronx 12

Area
  - Total: 2.61 sq mi (6.8 km^{2})

Population (2000)
  - Total: 63,345
  - Density: 24,300/sq mi (9,370/km^{2})

Economics
  - Median income: 42,102

Ethnicity
  - Black: 57.4%
  - White: 27.5%
  - Asian: 2.74%
  - Native American: 0.03%
  - Hispanic: 18.0%
  - Others: 2.9%
- Time zone: UTC−05:00 (Eastern (EST))
  - Summer (DST): UTC−04:00 (Eastern (EDT))
- ZIP Codes: 10469
- Area code: 718, 347, 929, and 917
- Website: www.baychester.nyc

Baychester is a neighborhood geographically located in the northeast part of the Bronx, New York City. Its boundaries are East 222nd Street to the northeast, the New England Thruway (Interstate 95) to the east, Gun Hill Road to the southwest, and Boston Road to the northwest. Eastchester Road is the primary thoroughfare through Baychester.

The neighborhood is part of Bronx Community Board 12. Many homes are located on streets in the 201s and advancing to the 220s. While 10469 is the primary ZIP Code of Baychester, it also covers the adjacent neighborhood of Pelham Gardens, Bronx. The area is patrolled by the 47th Precinct of the New York City Police Department.

== Land use and terrain ==
Baychester is dominated by one and two family homes of various styles. The total land area is 2.61 square miles. The area is low lying and flat; some parts of the East Bronx are built on marshland and valleys. The area was formerly home to the amusement park Freedomland U.S.A., opened in 1959 and closed in 1964 on the site of what is now Co-op City. Part of the neighborhood, bounded by Boston, Eastchester, and Gun Hill Roads, is alternately referred to as Fish Bay.

== Demographics ==
As of the census of 2000, there were 63,345 people and 23,144 housing units in the neighborhood. The population density was 24,249.08 people per square mile. The racial makeup of the neighborhood was 27.5% White, 57.4% African American, 0.03% Native American, 2.74% Asian, 0.5% from other races, and 2.9% from two or more races. Hispanic or Latino of any race were 18.0% of the population.

In the adjacent neighborhood of Co-op City, which is sometimes considered a part of Baychester, the population is 43,752. Baychester was once predominantly white (non-Hispanic), but is now predominantly West Indian. The median income for a household in the neighborhood was $42,102. About 13.8% of the population were below the poverty line.

The entirety of Community District 12, which comprises Baychester and Williamsbridge, had 156,542 inhabitants as of NYC Health's 2018 Community Health Profile, with an average life expectancy of 81.0 years. This is about the same as the median life expectancy of 81.2 for all New York City neighborhoods. Most inhabitants are youth and middle-aged adults: 24% are between the ages of between 0–17, 27% between 25 and 44, and 26% between 45 and 64. The ratio of college-aged and elderly residents was lower, at 10% and 13% respectively.

As of 2017, the median household income in Community District 12 was $48,018. In 2018, an estimated 22% of Baychester and Williamsbridge residents lived in poverty, compared to 25% in all of the Bronx and 20% in all of New York City. One in eight residents (13%) were unemployed, compared to 13% in the Bronx and 9% in New York City. Rent burden, or the percentage of residents who have difficulty paying their rent, is 57% in Baychester and Williamsbridge, compared to the boroughwide and citywide rates of 58% and 51% respectively. Based on this calculation, as of 2018, Baychester and Williamsbridge are considered high-income relative to the rest of the city and not gentrifying.

== Police and crime ==
Baychester and Williamsbridge are patrolled by the 47th Precinct of the NYPD, located at 4111 Laconia Avenue. The 47th Precinct ranked 35th safest out of 69 patrol areas for per-capita crime in 2010. As of 2018, with a non-fatal assault rate of 82 per 100,000 people, Baychester and Williamsbridge's rate of violent crimes per capita is more than that of the city as a whole. The incarceration rate of 577 per 100,000 people is higher than that of the city as a whole.

The 47th Precinct has a lower crime rate than in the 1990s, with crimes across all categories having decreased by 60.9% between 1990 and 2022. The precinct reported 16 murders, 45 rapes, 461 robberies, 732 felony assaults, 300 burglaries, 758 grand larcenies, and 461 grand larcenies auto in 2022.

== Fire safety ==
Baychester is served by the New York City Fire Department (FDNY)'s Engine Co. 38/Ladder Co. 51 fire station at 3446 Eastchester Road.

== Health ==
As of 2018, preterm births and births to teenage mothers are more common in Baychester and Williamsbridge than in other places citywide. In Baychester and Williamsbridge, there were 102 preterm births per 1,000 live births (compared to 87 per 1,000 citywide), and 24 births to teenage mothers per 1,000 live births (compared to 19.3 per 1,000 citywide). Baychester and Williamsbridge has a low population of residents who are uninsured. In 2018, this population of uninsured residents was estimated to be 8%, lower than the citywide rate of 12%.

The concentration of fine particulate matter, the deadliest type of air pollutant, in Baychester and Williamsbridge is 0.0075 milligrams per cubic metre (7.5×10^{−9} oz/ft^{3}), the same as the city average. Eleven percent of Baychester and Williamsbridge residents are smokers, which is lower than the city average of 14% of residents being smokers. In Baychester and Williamsbridge, 30% of residents are obese, 14% are diabetic, and 39% have high blood pressure—compared to the citywide averages of 24%, 11%, and 28% respectively. In addition, 24% of children are obese, compared to the citywide average of 20%.

Eighty-eight percent of residents eat some fruits and vegetables every day, which is about the same as the city's average of 87%. In 2018, 78% of residents described their health as "good", "very good", or "excellent", equal to the city's average of 78%. For every supermarket in Baychester and Williamsbridge, there are 8 bodegas.

The nearest large hospitals are Calvary Hospital, Montefiore Medical Center's Jack D. Weiler Hospital, and NYC Health + Hospitals/Jacobi in Morris Park. The Albert Einstein College of Medicine campus is also located in Morris Park. In addition, Montefiore Medical Center's Wakefield Campus is located in Williamsbridge.

== Post offices and ZIP Code ==
Baychester is located within ZIP Code 10469. The United States Postal Service operates two post offices nearby: the Hillside Station at 3482 Boston Road and the Baychester Station at 1525 East Gun Hill Road.

== Education ==
Baychester and Williamsbridge generally have a lower rate of college-educated residents than the rest of the city as of 2018. While 32% of residents age 25 and older have a college education or higher, 20% have less than a high school education and 48% are high school graduates or have some college education. By contrast, 26% of Bronx residents and 43% of city residents have a college education or higher. The percentage of Baychester and Williamsbridge students excelling in math rose from 32% in 2000 to 48% in 2011, though reading achievement remained constant at 37% during the same time period.

Baychester and Williamsbridge's rate of elementary school student absenteeism is slightly higher than the rest of New York City. In Baychester and Williamsbridge, 29% of elementary school students missed twenty or more days per school year, more than the citywide average of 20%. Additionally, 70% of high school students in Baychester and Williamsbridge graduate on time, about the same as the citywide average of 75%.

=== Schools ===
- P.S. 76 - Bennington Elementary School located at 900 Adee Avenue
- P.S. 78 - Anne Hutchinson Elementary School located at 1400 Needham Avenue
- P.S. 87 - located at 1935 Bussing Avenue, Bronx, New York 10466 - Baychester/Wakefield area.
- P.S. 89 - Williamsbridge Elementary School located at 980 Mace Avenue
- P.S. 97 - located at 1375 Mace Avenue
- P.S. 121 - The Throop School located at 2750 Throop Avenue
- P.S. 169 - Baychester Academy located at 3500 Edson Avenue
- M.S. 144 - Michelangelo Middle School located at 2545 Gunther Avenue
- Bronxwood Preparatory Academy - located on east 228th Street and Bronxwood Avenue
- Christopher Columbus High School (Bronx) - located at 925 Astor Avenue
- Harry S. Truman High School (Bronx) - located in the Co-op City neighborhood.
- Evander Childs Educational Campus - located in the Williamsbridge neighborhood.

Private

- Lavelle School for the Blind

=== Libraries ===
The New York Public Library (NYPL)'s Eastchester branch is located at 1385 East Gun Hill Road. It has operated since 1950 and moved to its current one-story, 7,500-square-foot (700 m^{2}) location in 1985. In addition, the NYPL's Baychester branch is located at 2049 Asch Loop North in Co-op City. The one-story branch building opened in 1973 and was renovated in 2003.

== Transportation ==
The following MTA Regional Bus Operations bus routes serve Baychester:

- Bx25, Bx26: to Co-op City or Bedford Park (via Allerton Avenue)
- Bx28: to Co-op City or Fordham Center (via Gun Hill Road)
- Bx30: to Co-op City or Pelham Parkway station (2 and 5 trains) (via Boston Road)
- Bx31: to Woodlawn or Westchester Square – East Tremont Avenue station (6 and <6> trains) (via Eastchester Road)
- Bx38: to Co-op City or 205th Street station (D train) (via Gun Hill Road)
- BxM10: to Midtown Manhattan (via Fifth/Madison Avenues and Eastchester Road/Morris Park Avenue)

Baychester is also served by the following Bee-Line Bus System routes to Westchester County, New York:

- BL60: to White Plains, New York or Fordham Center (via Boston Road)
- BL61: to Port Chester, New York, Mamaroneck and Larchmont or Fordham Center (via Boston Road)
- BL62: to White Plains, New York (Express-Rush hour only service White Plains in the morning, Fordham in the evening) or Fordham Center (via Boston Road)

The following New York City Subway stations serve Baychester:

- Baychester Avenue (5 train)
- Gun Hill Road (5 train)
