= Bx28 and Bx38 buses =

Bus routes in the Bronx, New York

bx28, bx38
- Gun Hill Road
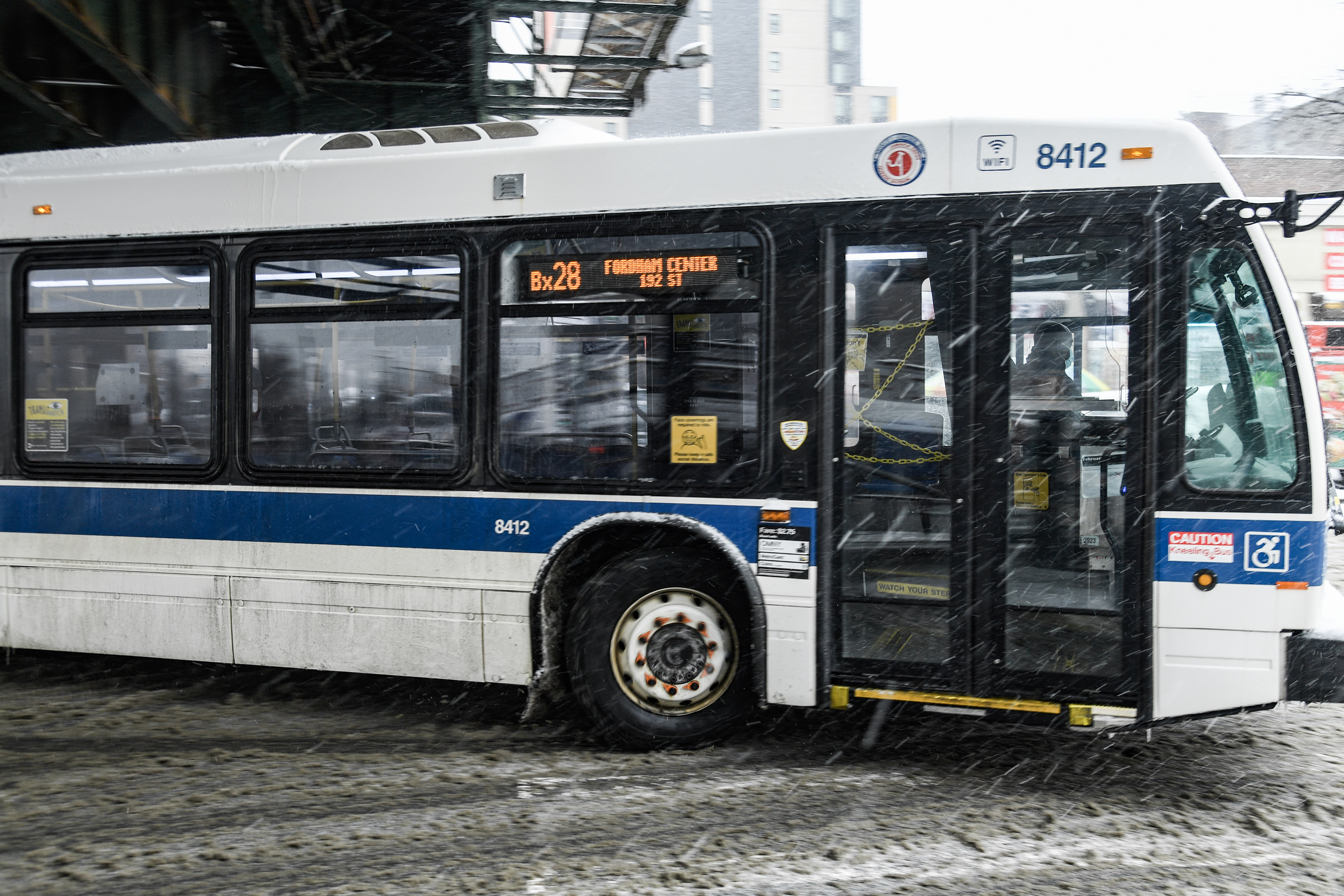
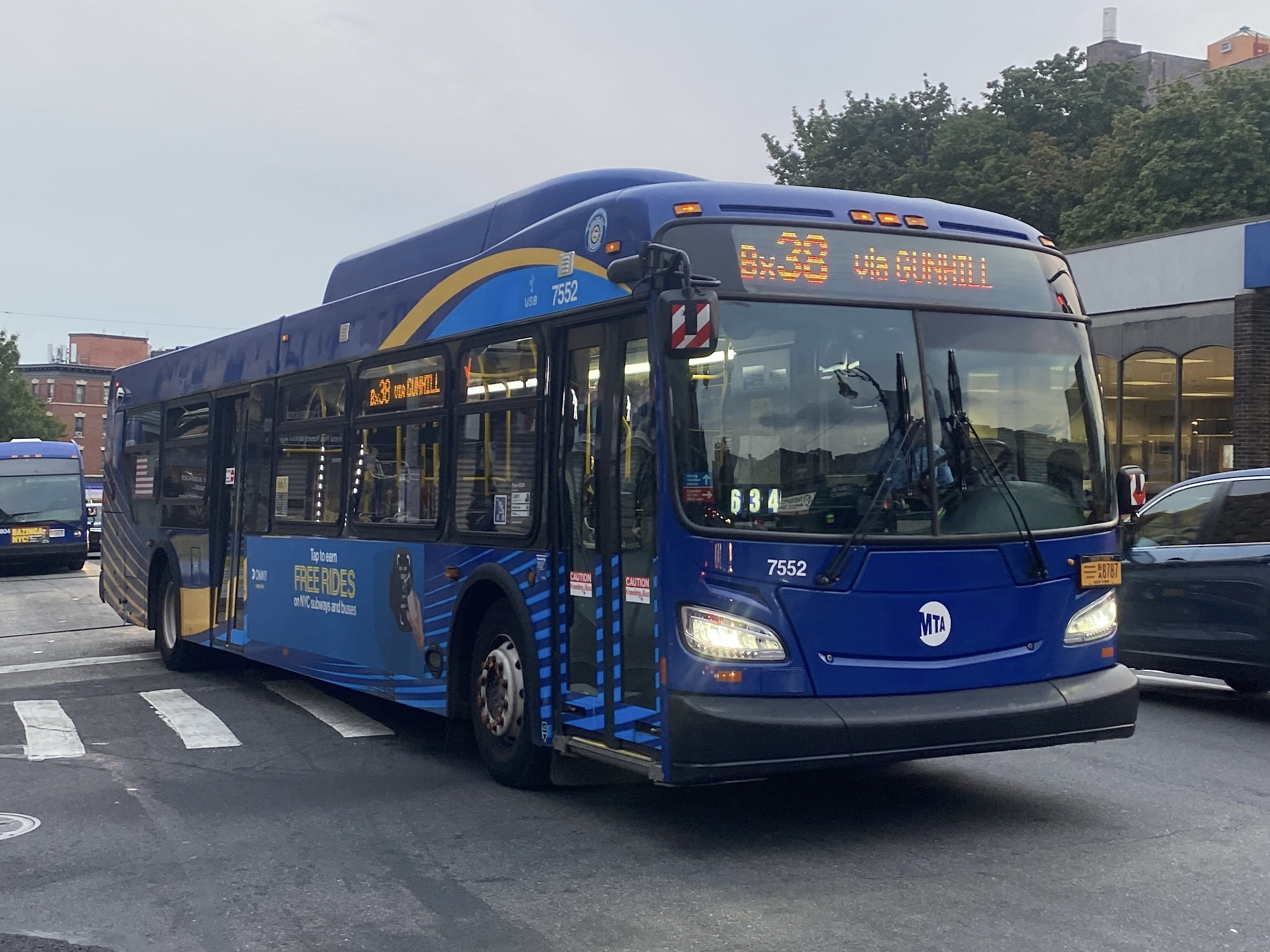
- A 2015 Nova Bus LFS (8412) on the Bx28 at Kingsbridge Road/Jerome Avenue, and a 2018 XD40 (7552) on the Bx38.

Overview
- System: MTA Regional Bus Operations
- Operator: Manhattan and Bronx Surface Transit Operating Authority
- Garage: Gun Hill Depot; Kingsbridge Depot (Bx28 A.M. rush only)
- Vehicle: Nova Bus LFS; Nova Bus LFS HEV; New Flyer Xcelsior XD40; New Flyer Xcelsior XE40 (main vehicles); Nova Bus LFSe+ Nova Bus LFS Articulated; New Flyer Xcelsior XD60 (Bx28 A.M. rush only)
- Began service: September 18, 1933 (Bx28); June 25, 2010 (Bx38)

Route
- Locale: The Bronx, New York, U.S.
- Communities served: Fordham, Kingsbridge Heights, Bedford Park, Norwood, Olinville, Williamsbridge, Baychester, Co-op City
- Start: Fordham - East 192nd Street & Valentine Avenue (Bx28 daytime & Bx38 Sunday mornings and late evenings); Norwood - Norwood-205th Street station (Bx28 late nights & Bx38)
- Via: Gun Hill Road, Co-op City Boulevard (Bx38)
- End: Co-op City - Earhart Lane & Erskine Place (Bx28); Co-op City - Bay Plaza (Bx38)
- Length: 7.4 miles (11.9 km) (Bx28); 5.9 miles (9.5 km) (Bx38)
- Other routes: Bx25/Bx26 Bedford Park Boulevard/Allerton Avenue; Bx30 Boston Road

Service
- Operates: All times (Bx28); All times except late nights (Bx38)
- Annual patronage: 2,162,113 (2025)
- Timetable: Bx28/38

The Bx28 and Bx38 constitute a public transit line in The Bronx. These routes primarily run on Gun Hill Road between the northern part of West Bronx and Co-op City.

== Route description ==
The Bx28 begins at 192nd Street and Valentine Avenue. It heads north onto Kingsbridge Road, turning north onto Jerome Avenue and running via Paul Avenue between Bedford Park Boulevard and Mosholu Parkway to serve Lehman College and turning southeast on Mosholu Parkway and then turning north onto Bainbridge Avenue. At 205th Street, it is joined by the Bx38, where both routes continue north on Bainbridge Avenue, before turning right onto Gun Hill Road, running on it until reaching Bartow Avenue, continuing east until reaching Baychester Avenue, where the routes split:

- The Bx28 heads east on Bartow Avenue, deviating to serve Asch Loop, before continuing east onto Bartow Avenue as it becomes Hutchinson River Parkway East and continuing south onto Hunter Avenue to Earhart Lane-Erskine Place
- The Bx38 runs north on Baychester Avenue and runs east on Co-op City Boulevard, deviating to serve Dreiser Loop, continuing south and skipping Asch Loop, turning east back onto Bartow Avenue and continuing for a short distance before turning south onto Bay Plaza Drive to terminate at AMC Bay Plaza. Westbound buses head south to Bay Plaza Boulevard, turning west and then north onto Co-op City Boulevard to return to service.

During late nights when the Bx38 does not run, the Bx28 follows the Bx38 route between Bay Plaza and Baychester Avenue-Bartow Avenue, but terminates at Norwood-205th Street station instead of Fordham.

Along the route, there are several connections to the New York City Subway at:

- Kingsbridge Road-Grand Concourse (B and D trains; Bx28 and Sunday morning and late evening Bx38)
- Kingsbridge Road-Jerome Avenue (4 train; Bx28 and Sunday morning and late evening Bx38)
- Bedford Park Boulevard-Jerome Avenue (4 train; Bx28 and Sunday morning and late evening Bx38)
- Mosholu Parkway-Jerome Avenue (4 train; Bx28 and Sunday morning and late evening Bx38)
- 205th Street (D train)
- White Plains Road (2 and 5 trains)
- Seymour Avenue (5 train)

=== School trippers ===
When school is in session, two extra Bx28 trips operate the full westbound route from two different schools: a complex in western Co-Op City, departing at 2:30pm, and Evander Childs Campus at Bronxwood Avenue, departing at 2:35pm.

== History ==
The Bx28 began on September 18, 1933, under the designation of the Bx15. On July 1, 1974, the Bx15 was extended on its eastern end from Gunther Avenue-Bartow Avenue to its current terminus at Co-op City and extended on its western end from Mosholu Parkway-Jerome Avenue to its current terminus in Fordham, although select trips and all Sunday trips continued to terminate at Mosholu Parkway-Jerome Avenue. A branch of the Bx15 from Norwood-205th Street to Eastchester Road-Boston Road was relabeled to the Bx6.

On February 19, 1984, as part of the Bronx bus revamp, the Bx15 was renamed to the Bx28. The Metropolitan Transportation Authority (MTA) proposed simplifying the Bx26's and Bx28's complicated service patterns in March 2000. The Mosholu Parkway short-turn would be discontinued and all daytime Bx28 trips would run to Fordham Center to replace Bx26 service there; whenever service had headways lower than 10 minutes, every other bus would terminate at Norwood. These changes took place on September 10, 2000. On June 25, 2010, due to the MTA's budget crisis, Norwood short turns and service to sections 1-2-3 in Co-op City were spun off into a new designation, the Bx38, which would terminate at Bay Plaza, with service through Asch Loop discontinued outright. On June 29, 2014, Bx28 service via Asch Loop was restored.

In 2017, the MTA released its Fast Forward Plan, aimed at speeding up mass transit services. As part of this program, a draft plan for a reorganization of Bronx bus routes was proposed in draft format in June 2019, with a final version published in October 2019. The draft plan proposed rerouting the Bx28 on Bainbridge Avenue and Bedford Park Boulevard instead of Mosholu Parkway and Paul Avenue to replace a rerouted Bx34, the discontinuation of the Bx38, the removal of closely spaced stops and the truncation of the Bx28 to Asch Loop, with the Bx23 taking over all Co-op City inter-section service. The final plan removed the Bx38 discontinuation and the Bx28 truncation, but kept the reroute via Bainbridge Avenue and Bedford Park Boulevard, which was also dropped in late 2021, and the stop removal, which was kept. Due to the COVID-19 pandemic in New York City, the changes were halted for over a year. The modification took place on June 26, 2022.

== See also ==
- Bx30, another bus route that ran from Norwood to Co-op City along Gun Hill Road prior to June 2022
