= Bx25 and Bx26 buses =

Bus routes in the Bronx, New York

bx25, bx26
- Allerton Avenue
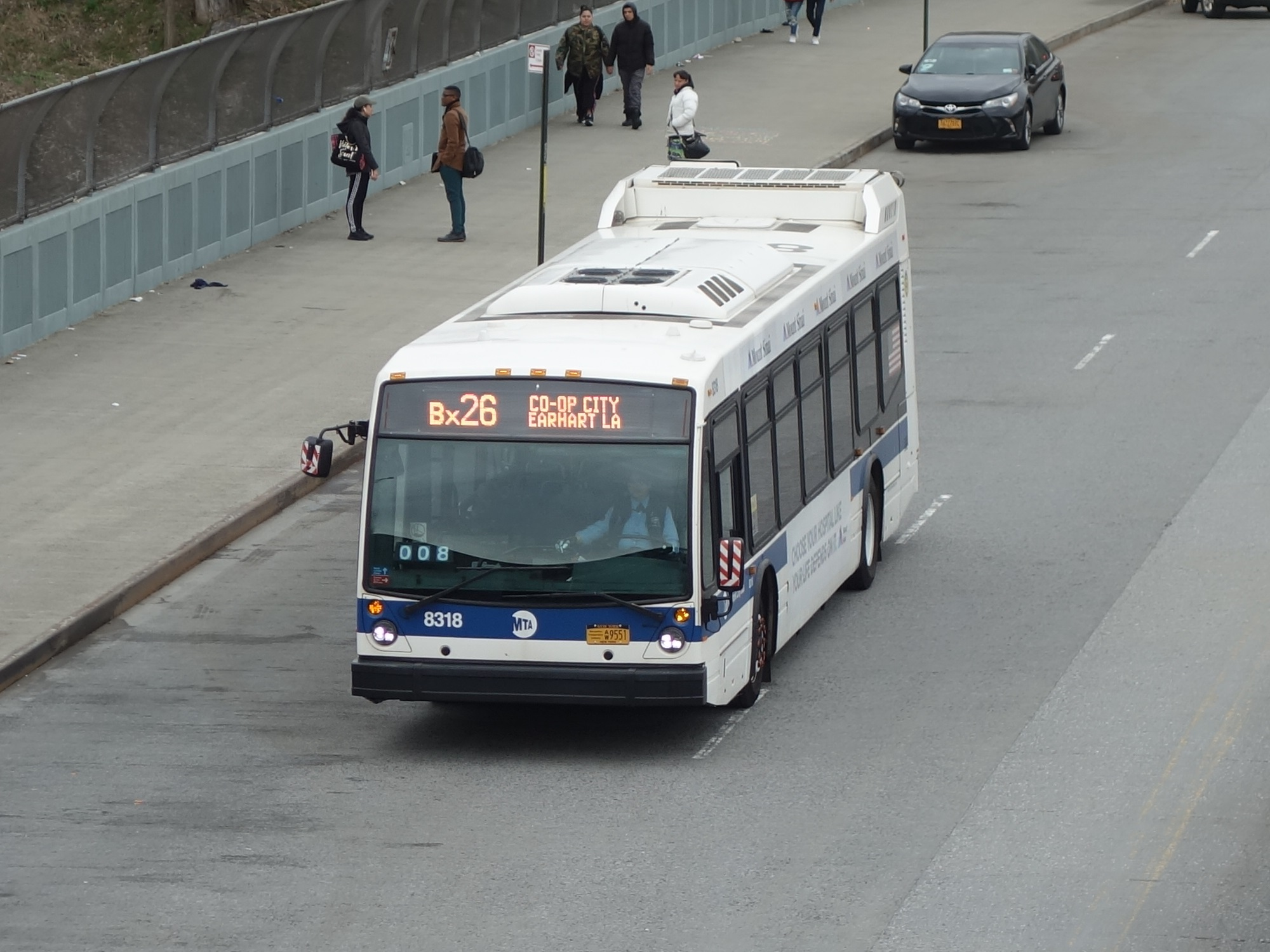
- A 2015 Nova Bus LFS (8318) on the Co-Op City-bound Bx26 on Bedford Park Boulevard in March 2019

Overview
- System: MTA Regional Bus Operations
- Operator: Manhattan and Bronx Surface Transit Operating Authority
- Garage: Gun Hill Depot
- Vehicle: Nova Bus LFS; Nova Bus LFS HEV; New Flyer Xcelsior XD40; New Flyer Xcelsior XE40
- Began service: 1928 (Bx26); September 10, 2000 (Bx25); June 26, 2022 (Bx25 reinstated)
- Ended service: June 25, 2010 (Bx25)

Route
- Locale: The Bronx, New York, U.S.
- Communities served: Bedford Park, Allerton, Laconia, Pelham Gardens, Baychester, Co-op City
- Start: Bedford Park - West 205th Street & Paul Avenue (Lehman College)
- Via: Bedford Park Boulevard, Allerton Avenue, Co-op City Boulevard (Bx25)
- End: Co-op City - Bay Plaza (Bx25); Co-op City - Earhart Lane & Erskine Place (Bx26)
- Length: 6.8 miles (10.9 km) (Bx25); 5.7 miles (9.2 km) (Bx26)
- Other routes: Bx28/Bx38 Gun Hill Road

Service
- Operates: All times except late nights
- Annual patronage: 509,214 (Bx25, 2025); 538,301 (Bx26, 2025)
- Transfers: Yes
- Timetable: Bx25/Bx26

The Bx25 and Bx26 constitute a public transit line in The Bronx. These routes primarily run on Bedford Park Boulevard and Allerton Avenue between Lehman College in Bedford Park and Co-op City.

== Route description ==
The Bx25 and Bx26 begin at Paul Avenue and 205th Street, looping around Harris Park. They then run south on Paul Avenue until Bedford Park Boulevard, where they run east until reaching Southern Boulevard/Kazimiroff Boulevard, continuing north and east as it becomes Allerton Avenue, heading east until Gunther Avenue, turning north there onto Bartow Avenue until reaching Baychester Avenue, where the routes split:

- The Bx25 runs north on Baychester Avenue and runs east on Co-op City Boulevard, deviating to serve Dreiser Loop, continuing south and skipping Asch Loop, turning east back onto Bartow Avenue and continuing for a short distance before turning south onto Bay Plaza Drive to terminate at AMC Bay Plaza. Westbound buses head south to Bay Plaza Boulevard, turning west and then north onto Co-op City Boulevard to return to service.
- The Bx26 heads east on Bartow Avenue, deviating to serve Asch Loop, before continuing east onto Bartow Avenue as it becomes Hutchinson River Parkway East and continuing south onto Hunter Avenue to Earhart Lane-Erskine Place

Along the route, there are several connections to the New York City Subway at:

- Jerome Avenue (4 train)
- Grand Concourse (B and D trains)
- White Plains Road (2 and 5 trains)

=== School trippers ===
When school is in session, two westbound Bx26 trips originate at J.H.S. 144 Michelangelo at Lodovick/Allerton Avenues. They depart at 2:15 and 2:55pm and terminate at White Plains Road. Another Bx26 bus departs at 2:25pm from a school complex in western Co-Op City. This trip heads to Bartow Avenue via Baychester Avenue and operates the full westbound route.

== History ==
The Bx26 began in 1928, under the Bx17 designation. On July 1, 1974, the Bx17 was extended from Allerton Avenue-Westervelt Avenue to its current terminus in Co-op City and extended from Allerton Avenue-White Plains Road to its current terminus in Bedford Park.

On February 19, 1984, as part of the Bronx bus revamp, the Bx17 was renamed to the Bx26. Service on the Bedford Park branch originally ran all times except late nights, but was reduced to only run during weekday rush hours, early weekend mornings and late evenings only in December 1991. Due to the Bx26 and Bx28 having complicated service patterns, in March 2000, the MTA proposed simplifying both of them. Service to Fordham Center would be replaced by the Bx28 and all Bx26 would run to/from Paul Avenue/Lehman College in Bedford Park; Bx26 Asch Loop bypass service that ran to the southern portion of Co-op City during rush hours would also be re-designated as the Bx25 to reduce rider confusion. These changes took place on September 10, 2000. On June 25, 2010, due to a budget crisis, Bx26 service to Sections 1-2-3 were discontinued, and all Bx26 service was rerouted to serve Asch Loop, alongside the discontinuation of the Bx25.

In 2017, the MTA released its Fast Forward Plan, aimed at speeding up mass transit services. As part of the program, a draft plan for a reorganization of Bronx bus routes was proposed in draft format in June 2019, with a final version published in October 2019. The draft plan proposed the truncation of the Bx26 to Asch Loop, with the Bx23 taking over all Co-op City inter-section service. The final plan removed this and instead proposed reinstating the Bx25, but it would serve sections 1-2-3 instead of Asch Loop and have its eastern terminus at Bay Plaza. Due to the COVID-19 pandemic in New York City, the changes were halted for over a year. The modification took place on June 26, 2022.
