= Harry S. Truman High School (Bronx) =

Public school in New York City

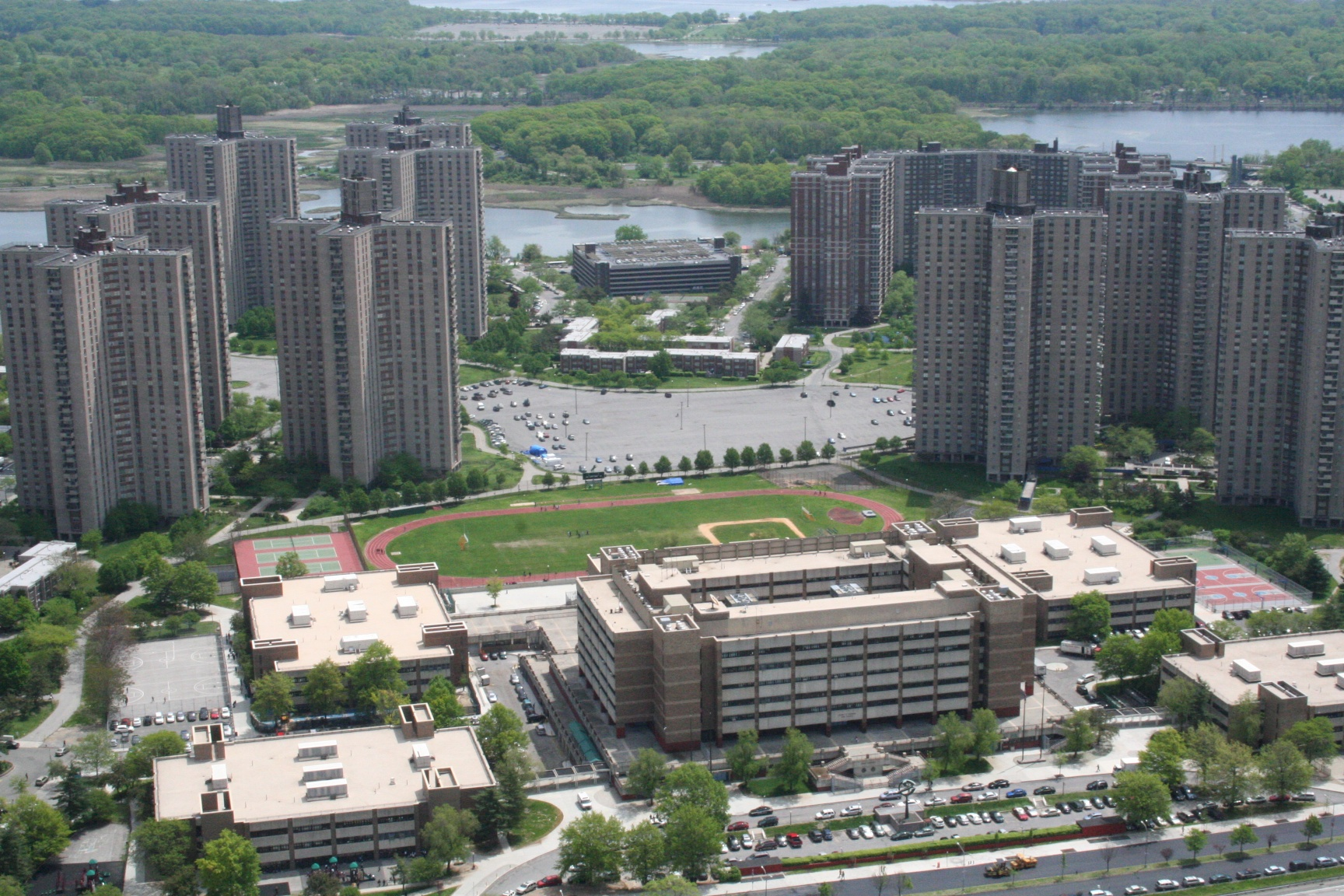
- Aerial view of Harry S. Truman High School and Co-op City

Location
- 750 Baychester Ave; Bronx, New York 10475; United States; 40°52′27″N 73°49′55″W

Information
- Type: Public
- Established: September 10, 1973
- School district: New York City Geographic District #11
- NCES School ID: 360008801963
- Principal: Keri Alfano
- Teaching staff: 143.65 (on an FTE basis)
- Grades: 9-12
- Enrollment: 1,892 (2022-2023)
- Student to teacher ratio: 13.17
- Campus: City: Large
- Colors: Green and White
- Mascot: Mustangs
- Website: www.bxtrumanhighschool.com

Harry S. Truman High School is a public high school at 750 Baychester Avenue, in the Co-op City section of the Bronx, New York City, United States. The school is designated as an Empowerment School by the New York City Department of Education, which allows it more autonomy in choosing a curriculum. Truman shares a uniquely designed and interconnected campus with two middle schools, MS 180 and 181, and two elementary schools, PS 178 and 153. The campus was designed to be a one-stop and close-to-home solution for students and families in the Co-op City neighborhood, although many of the students commute to school from other parts of the city. The main Truman building is also home to the Bronx Health Sciences High School, which occupies a portion of the third floor, and PS 176X, a special education school for autistic students, which shares a small portion of the first and second floors.

Truman High School is one of the remaining large high schools in the Bronx that has not been phased out and broken up into a number of small schools. This trend, which has been popular in the city, has seen other high schools in the borough, such as Evander Childs High School and Roosevelt High School closed and split into a number of smaller schools located in the same building. However, Truman High does host Bronx Health Sciences High School, created as part of the small schools movement, and previously hosted two additional high schools later moved to other locations. Truman High School and Bronx Health Sciences compose Harry S. Truman Educational Campus.

== History ==
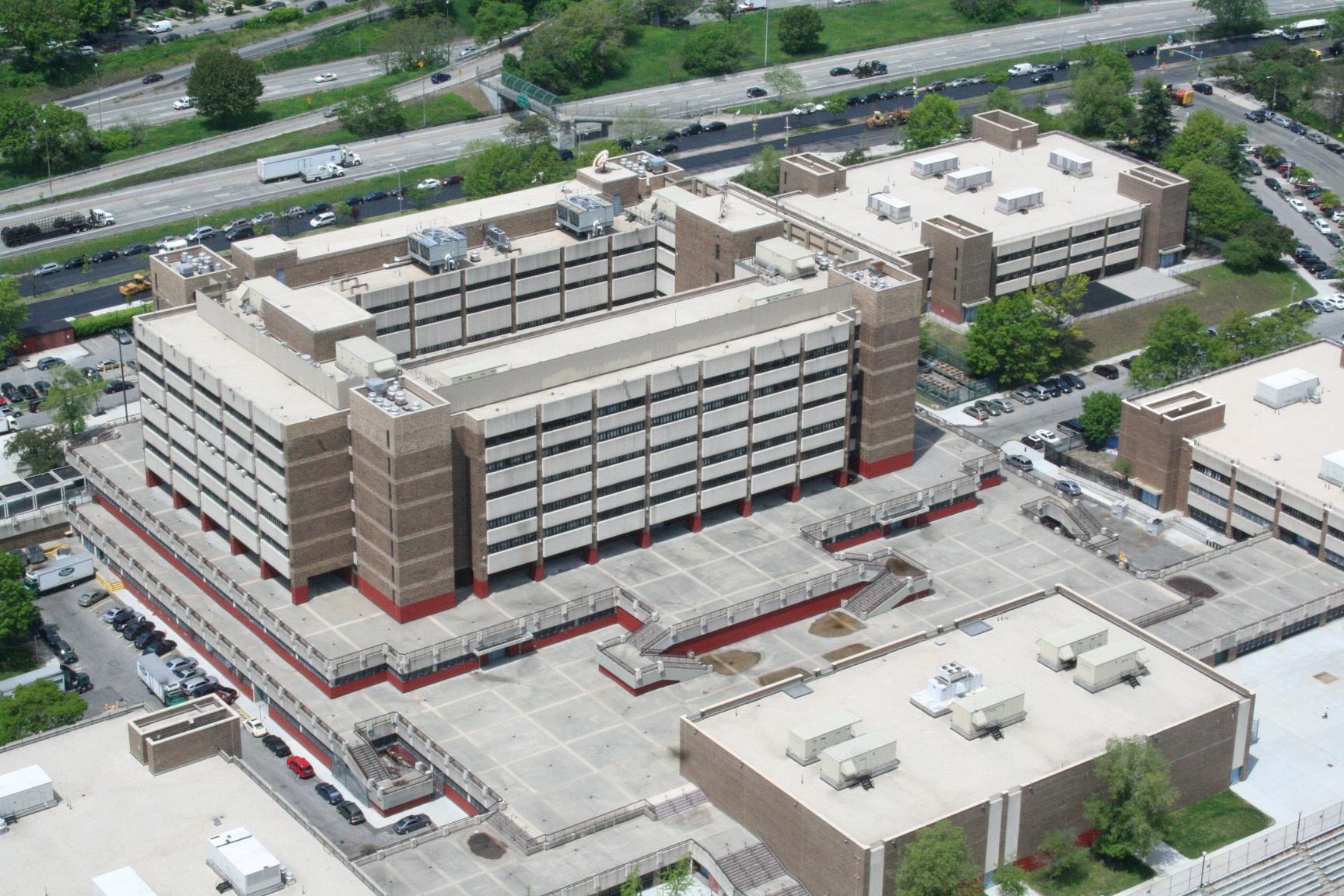
Closeup aerial view of Truman High School

The site of Truman High School and the rest of Co-op City was originally home to the Freedomland amusement park. In the mid-1960s, when Co-op City was being constructed, the city proposed to construct a large high school in the development as well as Herbert H. Lehman High School and Adlai E. Stevenson High School in eastern Bronx, John F. Kennedy High School in western Bronx, South Shore High School in Brooklyn, and August Martin High School in Queens. Both Truman and Kennedy High Schools were planned as "educational parks", containing multiple schools in park settings, and integrating students from multiple areas and backgrounds to stave off de facto segregation within the school system. Truman's academic park was also called "Northeast Bronx Educational Park" or "East Bronx Educational Park", with a total of five schools planned in the complex to serve 10,400 students from both Co-op City and surrounding neighborhoods. The Northeast Bronx Park was funded by a grant as part of the Elementary and Secondary Education Act, and was to be the prototype for numerous academic parks in other parts of the city. The project was sponsored and developed by the United Housing Foundation and RiverBay Corporation, who also developed Co-op City.

Construction on the complex began in 1969. During this time, a shopping center within the neighborhood was used as a temporary elementary school for local students. The first school completed within the park, PS 153, opened on September 13, 1971. The three remaining elementary and intermediate schools opened by September 1972. Truman High School opened on September 10, 1973, along with Beach Channel High School in Rockaway, Queens. The entire project cost $76 million. The completion of the athletic field was delayed due to the 1970s fiscal crisis. Soon after opening, the buildings of the complex were found to have numerous structural problems including leaks, cracking, and faulty utilities. The complex was boycotted by local residents in 1975 until repairs were made. The issues led New York State Comptroller Edward V. Regan to audit the complex in late 1979.

In 1998, Sana Q. Nasser became the principal of Truman. Under a partnership with the non-profit organization "P.E.N.C.I.L.", she has created six small career-themed academies in TV Production/Media Communications, Culinary Arts, Air Force Junior ROTC, Engineering & Robotics, Law, and Business Computing. The academies serve to create and maintain the benefits and feeling of a small high school, with the variety of courses and extracurricular activities that can only be offered at a large high school. Students take their academy classes every day, for all four years of high school, and change academies (or enroll in more than one), if their schedule permits. Statistical analysis done by the school has indicated that among students who participate in the academies, on-time graduation rates are significantly higher, and overall attendance, behavior and academic performance in the core subject areas have improved.

As part of the small schools movement championed by Mayor Michael Bloomberg and the Department of Education, three additional small high schools were opened within the Truman facility in September 2004: Bronx Health Sciences High School, East Bronx Academy for the Future, and Performance Conservatory High School (aka Bronx High School for Performance and Stagecraft). Truman was retained as a large high school. East Bronx Academy was moved to a new building in Crotona Park East in 2005, while Performance Conservatory is now part of the Herman Ridder Educational Campus and in the process of closing.

Bronx Health Sciences High School is a public high school. The high school opened in 2004. Its principal is Miriam Rivas. It has approximately 318 students, and a 19:1 student-teacher ratio.

On June 18, 2009, during his bid for re-election, Mayor Bloomberg claimed that during his administration, reported crimes at the school had dropped by a staggering 85%.

On September 6, 2013, Principal Sana Q. Nasser retired from her post as leader of the school.

== Awards and achievements ==
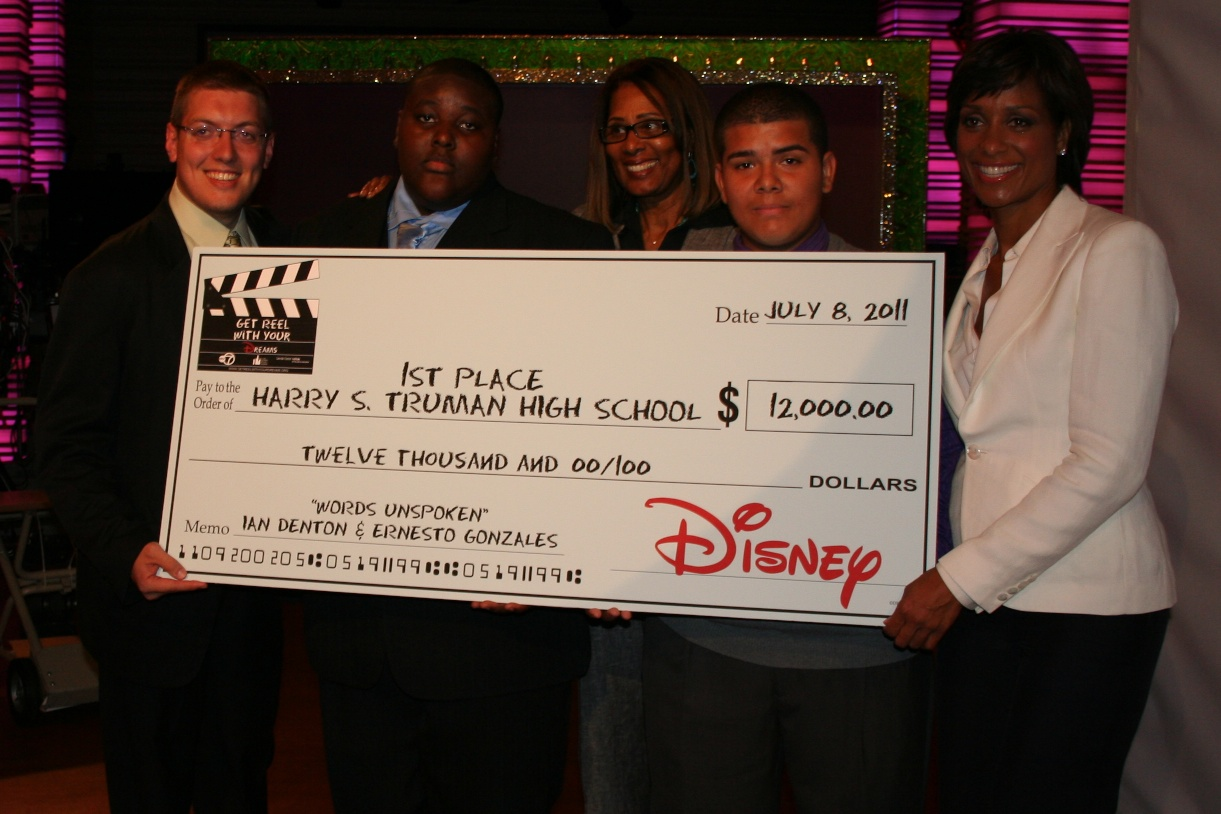
Students pose with Sade Baderinwa at WABC-TV to receive their first prize scholarship check.

In February 2011, Truman Media Academy students, while working on an internship at the Bronxnet Television network, received a daytime Emmy nomination for their work on a show called "Open 2.0" in the Teen: Program/Special category.

In June 2011, Truman Media Academy students Ernesto Gonzalez and Ian Denton won first place in the "Get Reel With Your Dreams" scholarship competition, hosted by Sade Baderinwa of WABC-TV and The Walt Disney Company for creating a 30-second public service announcement about child abuse.

In October 2011, Principal Nasser was selected to receive a NY Post Liberty Medal, for her work in creating a "small school feel, with higher graduation rates," at Truman.

In June 2015, Truman Media Academy student Oscar Anzora won first place in the 7th Annual "Get Reel With Your Dreams" scholarship competition, hosted by Sade Baderinwa of WABC-TV and The Walt Disney Company for creating a 30-second public service announcement about "Racism has always been a problem".

== School facilities ==
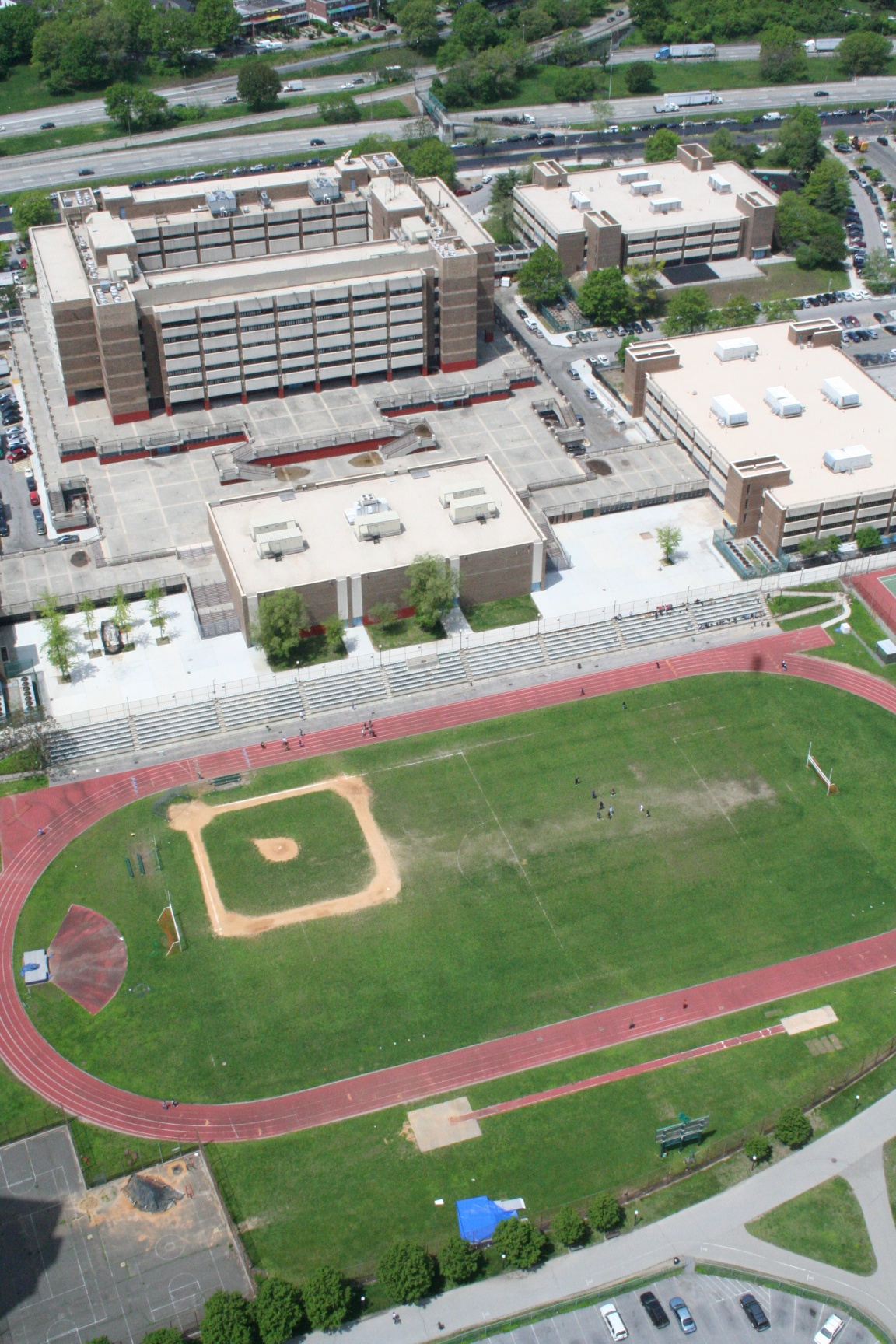
Aerial photo of the rear of Harry S. Truman High School. The three-section gymnasium appears at foreground.

The Truman complex is located on the east side of Baychester Avenue and the New England Thruway in western Co-op City, between sections 1 and 3 of the development. Truman High School sits at the center of the complex, circumscribed by the other four schools and the Truman gymnasium. The high school is seven stories high with a basement, designed for 4,000 students. The school's gymnasium building is located immediately east of the high school, featuring several dance studios, a wrestling gym, weight room, aerobics facility and a large gymnasium which can be separated into three smaller gyms. Outside at the east end of the complex, the school hosts a multi-purpose grass field for football and baseball surrounded by a six-lane track and field competition area, along with five tennis courts and handball courts.

The school's auditorium spans nearly three stories of the building vertically, and has two tiers of audience seating. The auditorium is shared with the connecting middle and elementary schools. Students can access it using tunnels that connect the five separate buildings.

When it was built, the school housed two indoor swimming pools. An Olympic-sized competition pool, which had been closed since 1995 due to eroded pipes was reopened in January 2012. An adjacent shallow training pool, also in disrepair, was not fixed due to a lack of sufficient funds. It is now hidden from view behind a wall built during the renovation.

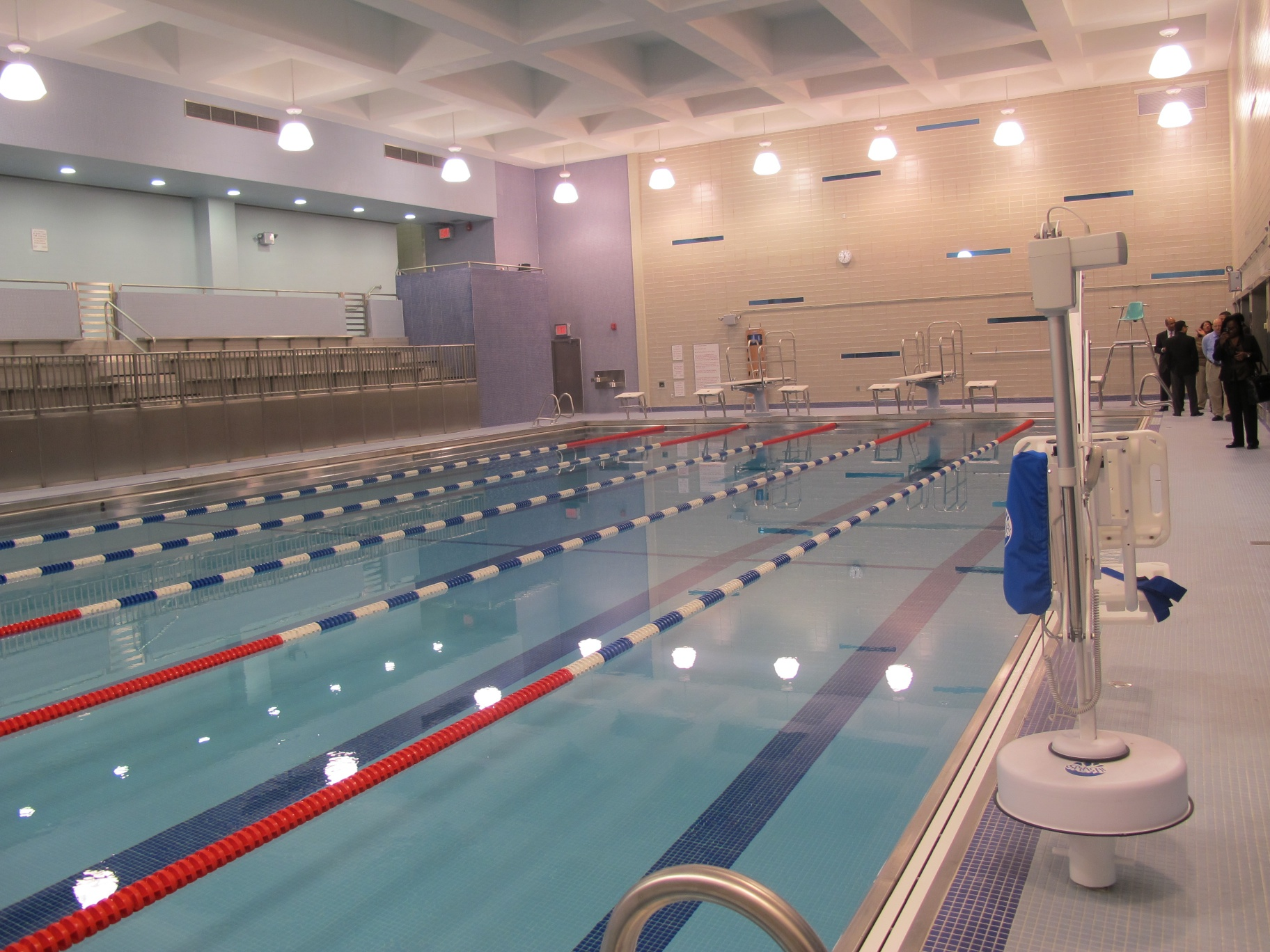
Renovated Pool area at Harry S. Truman High School

The Northeast Bronx Planetarium is also housed on the first floor of Truman's main building. Truman alumnus and former Bronx Borough President Adolfo Carrion Jr. secured $375,000 in capital funds to rehabilitate the space. The renovation replaced a decades-old system of over a dozen slide projectors with two high-resolution digital projectors, operated by a computer automation system. New carpet and seating was also installed. A ribbon cutting ceremony was held in November 2011 to officially reopen the space. In September 2013, a new Astronomy course was opened up to Truman students under the leadership of instructor Kathleen Robbins. The class meets daily in the planetarium, and several students in the program are trained to operate the digital facilities on their own.

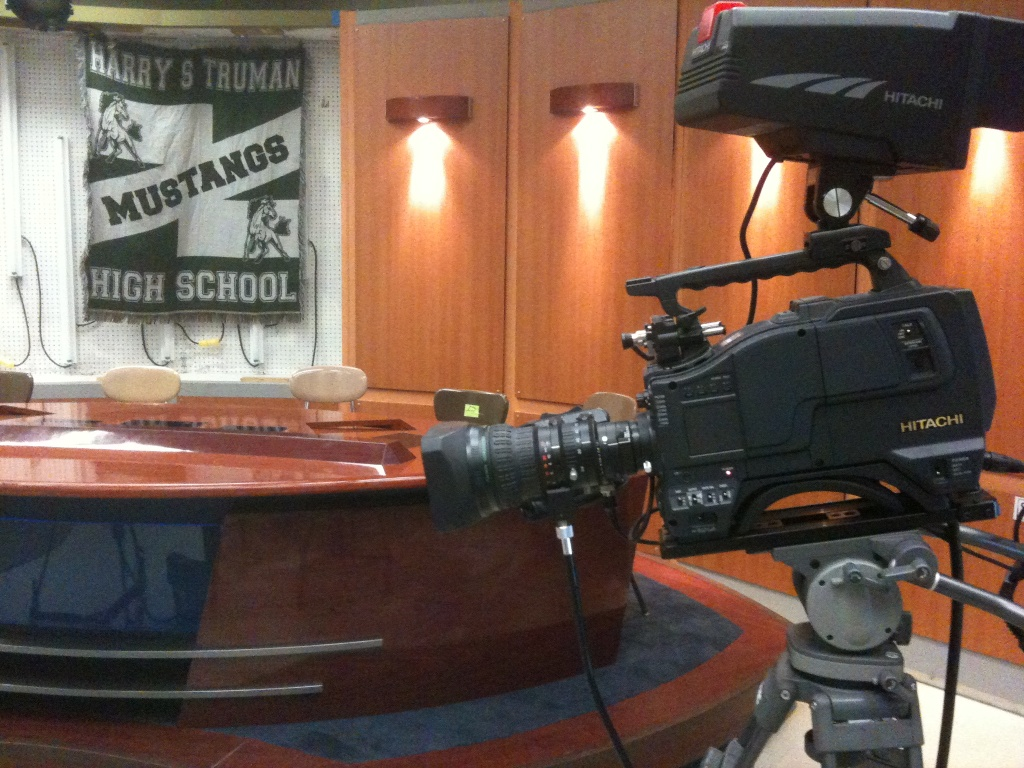
Television studio with anchor desk and set donated by News 12 Networks

Several areas of the building have also been customized to meet the needs of the special academies. These modifications include a television editing lab, control room and studio, as well as a radio studio on the first floor. Two classroom-kitchens were built on the 5th and 6th floors to accommodate the culinary arts program and a third is being planned for the 7th floor. The law program is housed in a custom-built courtroom and law library, complete with judge and witness benches and a jury box. The engineering and robotics program works in a competition-style field-of-play on the first floor. In the fall of 2013, a new museum opened on the 6th floor, highlighting the history and evolution of the school.

== Controversy ==
In May 2019, a lawsuit was filed against the city, the New York City Department of Education, and school administration for the wrongful death of 16-year-old student Mya Vizcarrondo-Rios. Vizcarrondo-Rios, who enrolled at the school in September 2017, was sexually assaulted by two male students in the school auditorium on February 28, 2018, and committed suicide later that same day by leaping to her death from the roof of her mother's 34-story Co-op City apartment building. She had been verbally and physically abused and bullied by other students from September 2017 to February 2018, and school officials failed to stop the bullying and notify her parents about the abuses their late daughter had endured. The lawsuit states that she had been physically and verbally assaulted by other students after the sexual assault and also during the five months preceding her death, she had complained to school officials numerous times for help; however, no action was taken.

== Notable alumni ==
- Big Tigger – is an American television/radio personality and rapper best known as the host of BET's Rap City and 106 & Park.
- Adolfo Carrión, Jr. – former Bronx Borough President
- Darcel Clark - current Bronx District Attorney
- D'Atra Hicks – singer, actress
- Stanley Jefferson – is a former Major League Baseball player who played for the New York Mets and New York Yankees.
- Miles Marshall Lewis – author and journalist
- Peter Liguori – entertainment executive
- Rod Strickland – is an American basketball executive and retired National Basketball Association player.
- Swizz Beatz – is an American record producer, rapper, businessman, and art collector.

== Notable faculty ==
- David Bernsley (born 1969), American-Israeli basketball player
