= Stan Jefferson =

American baseball player (born 1962)

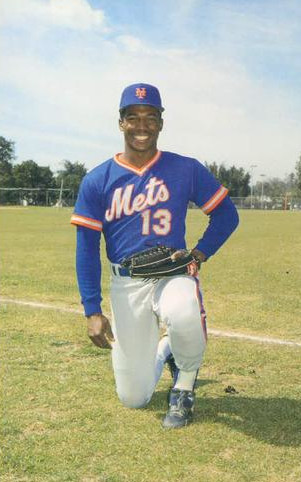
- Jefferson in 1986
- Outfielder
- Born: December 4, 1962 (age 63); New York, New York, U.S.
- Batted: Switch Threw: Right

MLB debut
- September 7, 1986, for the New York Mets

Last MLB appearance
- October 1, 1991, for the Cincinnati Reds

MLB statistics
- Batting average: .216
- Home runs: 16
- Runs batted in: 67
- Stats at Baseball Reference

Teams
- New York Mets (1986); San Diego Padres (1987–1988); New York Yankees (1989); Baltimore Orioles (1989–1990); Cleveland Indians (1990–1991); Cincinnati Reds (1991)

Stanley Jefferson (born December 4, 1962) is an American former center and left fielder in Major League Baseball who played for the New York Mets, San Diego Padres, New York Yankees, Baltimore Orioles, Cleveland Indians and Cincinnati Reds from 1986 to 1991.

== Early life and education ==
Jefferson, who grew up in Co-Op City in the Bronx and played many years in the Co-Op City Little League, graduated from Harry S. Truman High School in the Bronx in 1980. He attended Bethune-Cookman College in Daytona Beach, Florida from 1981 to 1983, and later obtained his bachelor's degree at Mercy College in Dobbs Ferry, New York.

== Career ==
=== Professional baseball ===
Jefferson displayed impressive speed and agility and was selected by the New York Mets in the first round (20th pick overall) of the free agent draft on June 6, 1983. After playing in the minors for three years, Jefferson played in 14 games for the Mets during the last month of the 1986 season.

On December 11, 1986, the Mets traded Jefferson, Kevin Mitchell, Shawn Abner, Kevin Armstrong, and Kevin Brown to the San Diego Padres for Kevin McReynolds, Gene Walter, and Adam Ging. Though he became a regular in the Padres outfield in 1987, he clashed with manager Larry Bowa in May and spent much of the first half on the disabled list. Jefferson stole 33 bases and batted .230 that year.

In 1988, Jefferson performed poorly, batting .144 over 111 at bats. At the end of the season he was traded with Jimmy Jones and Lance McCullers to the New York Yankees for Jack Clark and Pat Clements. He logged 12 at-bats with the Yankees before being traded to the Orioles in July 1989. For the next year and a half, he played intermittently for the Baltimore Orioles, Cleveland Indians, and Cincinnati Reds. Jefferson’s career ended in 1991 after suffering a career ending injury to his Achilles’ tendon.

Jefferson later became a coach for Butte Cooper Kings of the Pioneer League. When the player's strike threatened the 1995 season, Jefferson became a maligned replacement player for his original team, sharing the outfield with fellow ex-Met Herm Winningham.

=== NYPD ===
In 1997, following his professional baseball career, Jefferson joined the New York City Police Department. He was on duty during the September 11 attacks, and worked at Ground Zero after the collapse of the World Trade Center. He suffered health problems as a result of his time at Ground Zero, and retired from the NYPD in 2004.

== Personal life ==
Jefferson lives in Florida and has two grown daughters who live in Virginia. During the peak of his career, Jefferson shied away from the spotlight and preferred a private, low key profile. In 2016, in an interview on SNY, he reflected on his baseball career and his career as an NYPD officer, addressing his experience during the September 11 terrorist attacks. In 2018, Jefferson was recognized for his athletic and heroic contributions by Bethune-Cookman University and was inducted into their Hall of Fame alongside other accomplished alumni.
