= Co-op City, Bronx =

Neighborhood in New York City

Co-op City
- Neighborhood of the Bronx
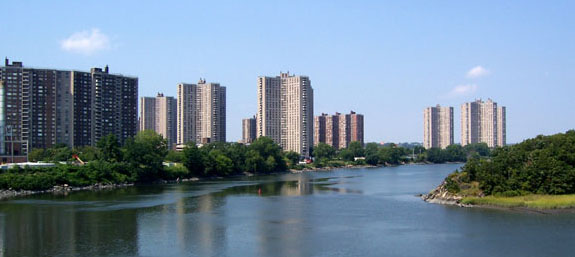
- Co-op City (here seen from the east) sits along the Hutchinson River.
- Interactive map of Co-op City
- Coordinates: 40.874°N 73.829°W
- Country: United States
- State: New York
- City: New York City
- Borough: The Bronx
- Community District: The Bronx 10
- Constructed: 1966-73

Area
  - Total: 0.936 sq mi (2.42 km^{2})

Population (2010)
  - Total: 43,752
  - Density: 46,700/sq mi (18,000/km^{2})

Race & Ethnicity
  - White: 7%
  - Black: 59%
  - Hispanic: 29%
  - Asian: 2%
  - Other: 1%

Economics
  - Median Household Income: $51,951
- Time zone: UTC−05:00 (Eastern (EST))
  - Summer (DST): UTC−04:00 (Eastern (EDT))
- ZIP Code: 10475
- Area codes: 718, 347, 929, and 917
- Website: https://coopcity.com/

Co-op City (short for Cooperative City) is a cooperative housing development located in the northeast section of the borough of the Bronx in New York City, New York, U.S. It is bounded by Interstate 95 to the southwest, west, and north and the Hutchinson River Parkway to the east and southeast, and is partially in the Baychester and Eastchester neighborhoods. With 43,752 residents as of the 2010 United States census, it is the largest housing cooperative in the world. It is in New York City Council District 12.

The Co-op City site was marshland before being occupied by an amusement park called Freedomland U.S.A. from 1960 to 1964. Construction began in 1966 and the first residents moved in two years later, though the project was not completed until 1973. The construction of the community was sponsored by the United Housing Foundation and financed with a mortgage loan from New York State Housing Finance Agency.

The community is part of Bronx Community District 10 and its ZIP Code is 10475. Nearby attractions include Pelham Bay Park, Orchard Beach and City Island.

== Description ==
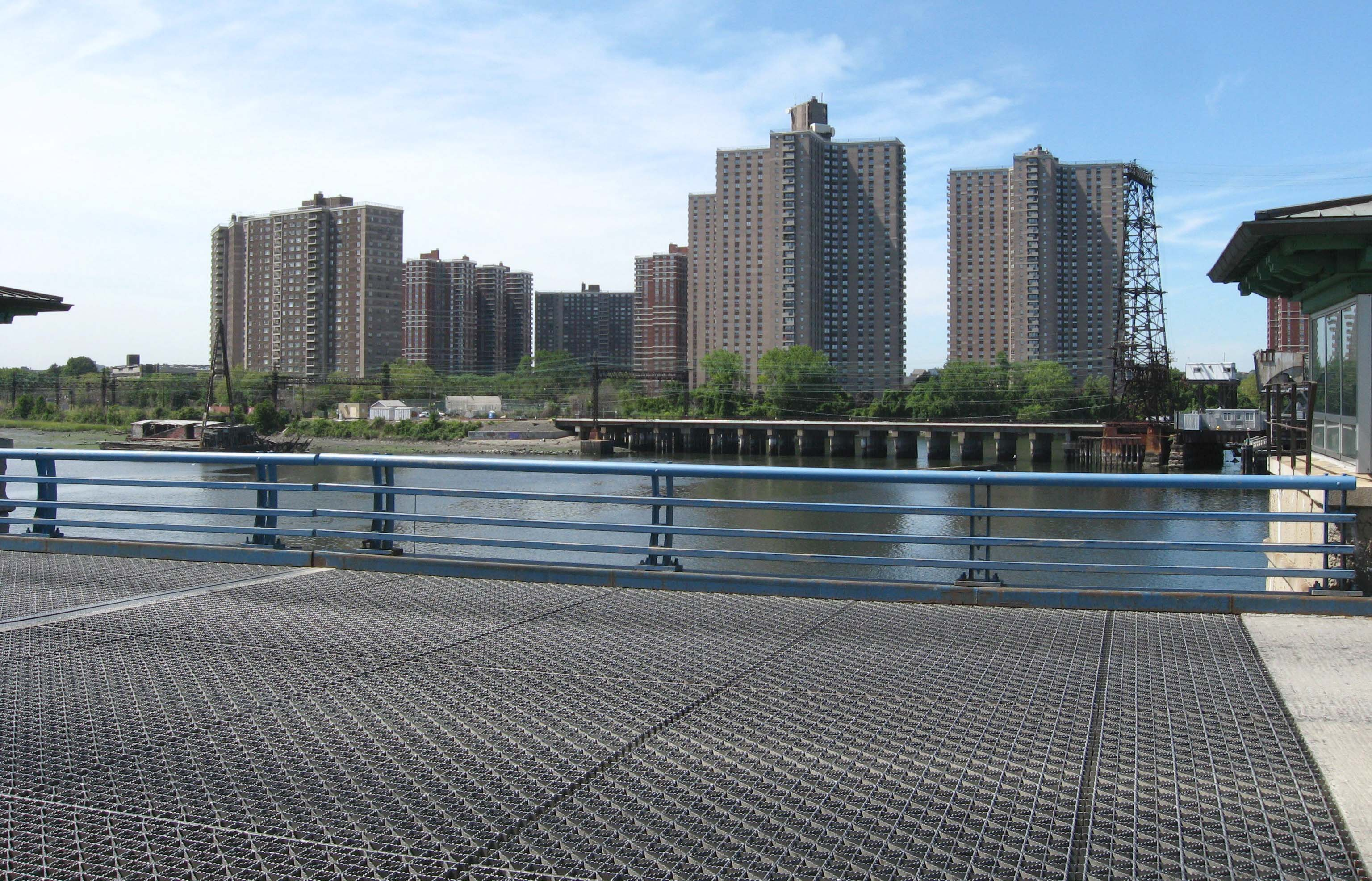
Viewed from the Pelham Bridge

Co-op City's 35 high-rise buildings and seven clusters of townhouses include 15,372 residential units, making it the largest residential development in the United States. It sits on 320 acres (1.3 km^{2}), though only 20% of the land was developed, leaving many green spaces. The apartment buildings range from 24 to 33 floors. There are four types of buildings: 10 Triple Core (26 stories high with 500 apartment units per building), 10 chevron (24 stories, 414 units), 15 tower (33 stories, 384 units), and 236 town houses. The townhouses are three stories high and have a separate garden apartment and upper duplex apartment.

This "city within a city" also has eight parking garages, three shopping centers, a 25-acre (0.10 km^{2}) educational park, including a high school, two middle schools, and three grade schools. More than 40 offices are rented by doctors, lawyers, and other professionals, and there are 15 houses of worship. Spread throughout the community are six nursery schools and day care centers, four basketball courts, and five baseball diamonds. The adjacent Bay Plaza Shopping Center has a 13-screen multiplex movie theater, department stores, and a supermarket.

The development was built on landfill, and the original marshland still surrounds it. The building foundations extend down to bedrock through 50,000 pilings, but the land surrounding Co-op's structures settles and sinks a fraction of an inch each year, creating cracks in sidewalks and entrances to buildings.

=== Street names ===
Most streets in the community are named after notable historical personalities. Generally, streets in section one begin with the letter "D", section two begins with the letter "C", section three with the letter "A", section four with the letter "B" and section five with the letter "E". Baychester Avenue is in section 1

- Adler Place – named for archaeologist Cyrus Adler
- Alcott Place – named for author Louisa May Alcott; it is located directly above the former path of Rattlesnake Brook, which originated in Edenwald
- Aldrich Street – named for author Thomas Bailey Aldrich
- Asch Loop – named for author Sholem Asch
- Bellamy Loop – named for writer Edward Bellamy; it was located on the eastern edge of Pinckney's Meadow and on the path of Rattlesnake Brook before becoming part of Freedomland
- Benchley Place – named for writer Robert Benchley
- Broun Place – named for sportswriter Heywood Broun
- Carver Loop – named for inventor George Washington Carver; it was formerly swampland and a tidal creek, not part of Freedomland
- Casals Place – named for conductor Pablo Casals; it was formerly swampland and not part of Freedomland
- Cooper Place – named for author James Fenimore Cooper; it was formerly a navigable tidal creek
- Darrow Place – named for lawyer Clarence Darrow
- Debs Place – named for socialist Eugene V. Debs
- Defoe Place – named for author Daniel Defoe
- De Kruif Place – named for microbiologist Paul de Kruif
- Donizetti Place – named for composer Gaetano Donizetti; it was a mill lane for 250 years before Co-op City was built
- Dreiser Loop – named for journalist Theodore Dreiser; it was part of the parking lot for Freedomland and located on the path of Rattlesnake Brook
- Earhart Lane – named for aviator Amelia Earhart; it was formerly occupied by barges and frame houses
- Einstein Loop – named for physicist Albert Einstein; it is the site of Givans and Barrow Creeks, on what was formerly the 14-acre Rose Island
- Elgar Place – named for composer Edward Elgar; it is the site of Givans Creek
- Erdman Place – named for poet Loula Grace Erdman; it is the site of Givans Creek
- Erskine Place – named for educator, author, pianist, and composer John Erskine

Other streets include:

- Bartow Avenue – named after Reverend John Bartow who served as rector of St. Peter's Episcopal Church in Westchester Square, and whose son later owned land in Pelham Bay Park
- Baychester Avenue – originally called South 18th Avenue and Comfort Avenue; named after the Baychester real estate venture of the 1890s
- Hutchinson River Parkway – named for the Hutchinson River, which is named for Anne Hutchinson
- Hunter Avenue

== History ==
=== Previous land use ===
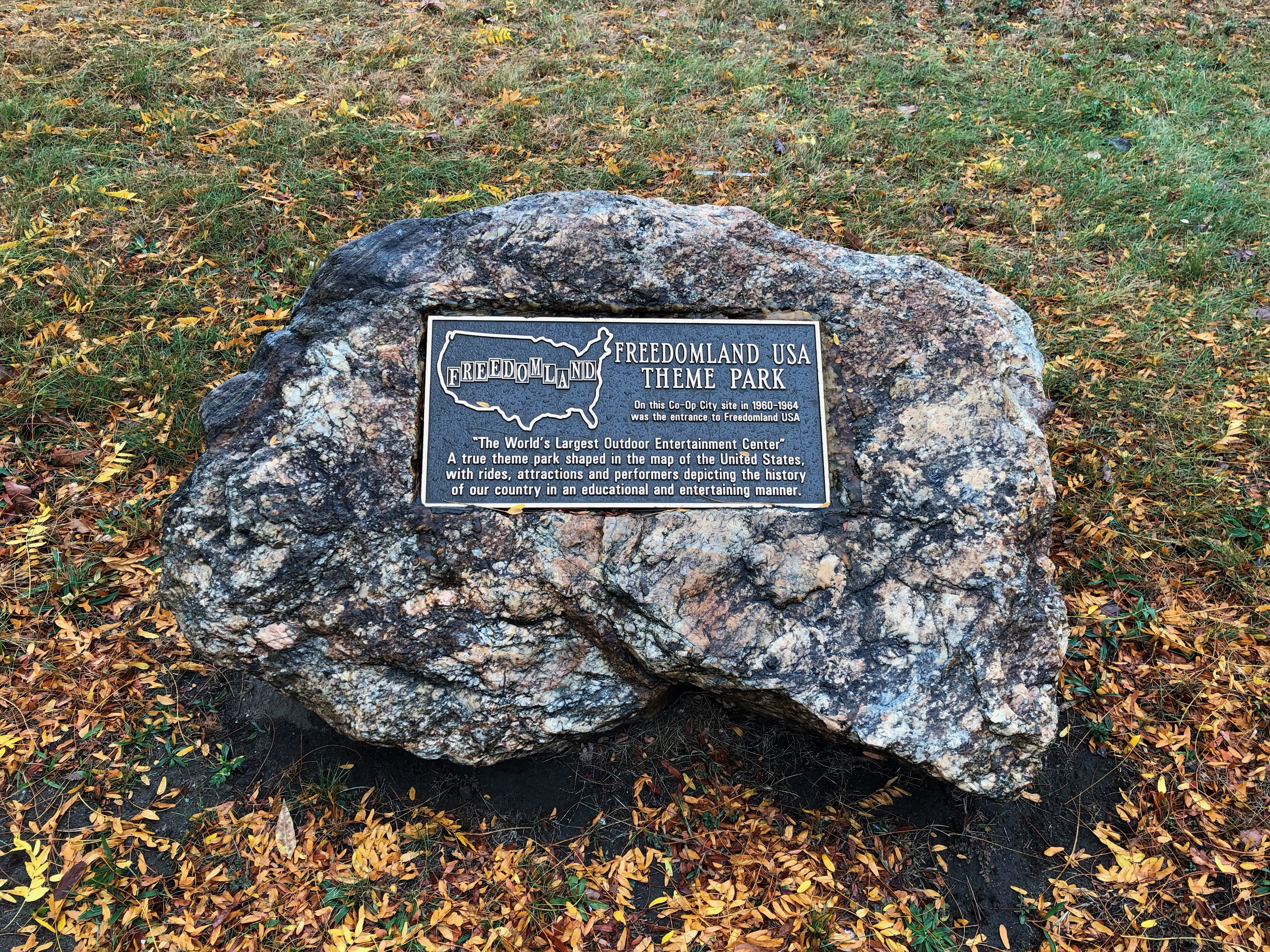
Plaque commemorating former Freedomland U.S.A. theme park

In the 1920s the land that would become Co-op City had been set aside, intended for a future municipal airport.

The land north of the Hutchinson River Parkway was a large swampy area known by residents as "the dump", and most of the land on the north side of the Hutchinson River was flat land used for recreation.

The land to the south of the Hutchinson River (now Section 5 of Co-op City) was swampland. A tidal estuary reached from the Hutchinson River at the New Haven Railroad along a route just north of Hunter and Boller Avenue to pass under the Hutchinson River Parkway. The estuary was the site of boat yards and canoe rental sites during the 1950s.

The northern portion of the site became the home of Freedomland U.S.A., a 205-acre theme park. This operated from June 19, 1960 until September 1964, when it closed after going bankrupt. A small portion of the former park site at the northeast corner of Bartow and Baychester Avenues in Co-op City remains zoned as a C7 district, reserved "for large open amusement parks". The zoning district is a holdover from Freedomland's operation.

=== Development ===
In February 1965, plans were announced for the residential Co-op City development, the world's largest housing cooperative, on the site. The plans for Co-op City were announced in May 1965, with no provisions for an amusement park. Construction on Co-op City began in May 1966. While much of the Freedomland site and some of the surrounding land was infilled, several existing houses were retained along Givans Creek (near Section 5 of Co-op City) because of opposition from residents there. These houses received sewage and other utilities, though these projects were delayed. There was a controversy when Co-op City builders filled the land to grade, because the existing houses were located as much as 12 feet (3.7 m) below grade, and filling for the main development caused storm runoff to flood the existing houses.

Residents began moving in during December 1968, and construction was completed in 1973. The project was sponsored and built by the United Housing Foundation, an organization established in 1951 by Abraham Kazan and the Amalgamated Clothing Workers of America, and was designed by cooperative architect Herman J. Jessor. The name of the complex's corporation itself was later changed to RiverBay at Co-op City.

=== Financing ===
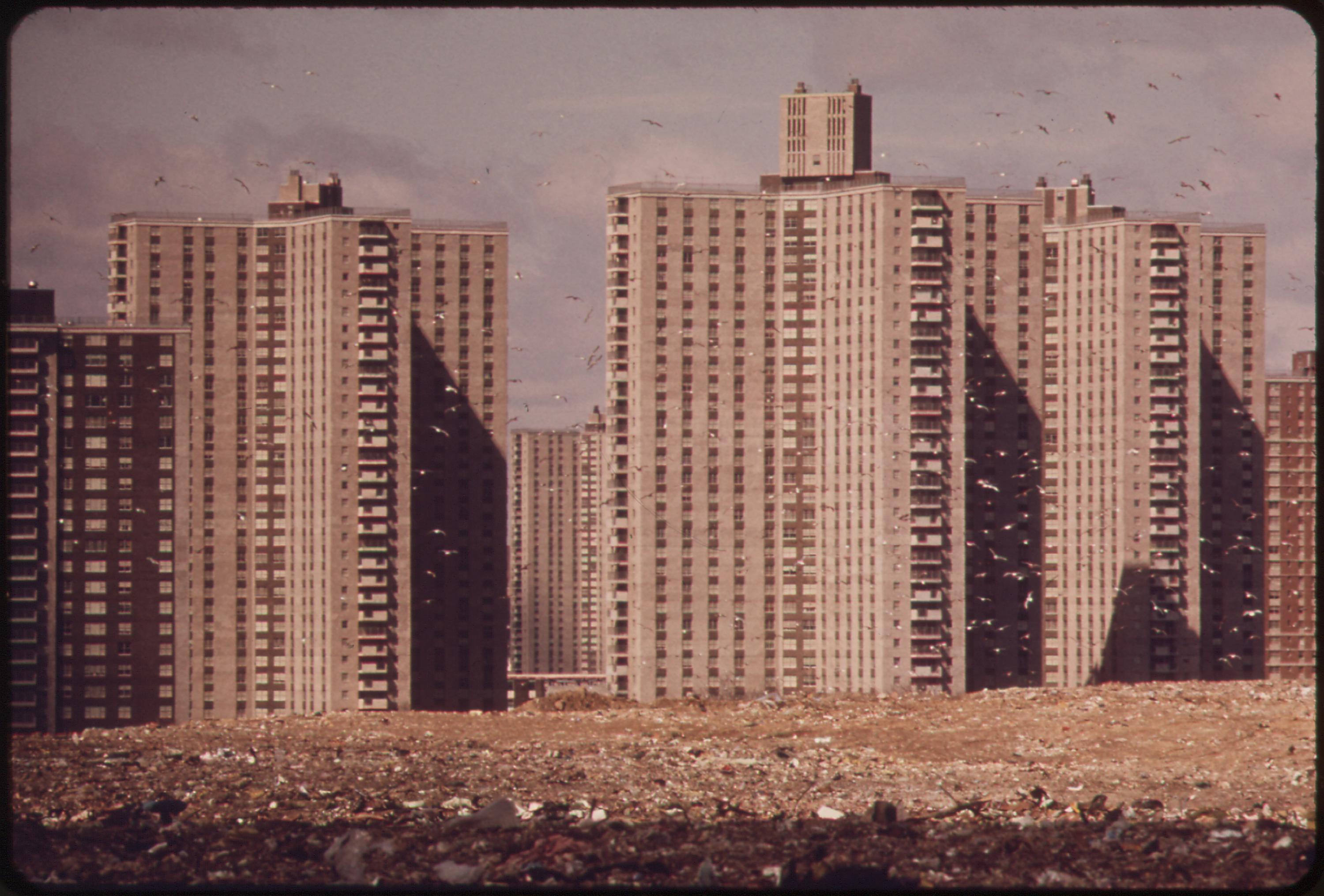
Co-op City in 1973; the lot in the foreground is a dump

The construction of the community was financed with a mortgage loan from New York State Housing Finance Agency (HFA). The complex defaulted on the loan in 1975 and has had ongoing agreements to pay back HFA.

Mismanagement, shoddy construction, and corruption led to the community's defaulting on its loan in 1975. The original Kazan board resigned, and the state took over control. Cooperators, faced with a 25-percent increase in their monthly maintenance fees, organized residents to refuse to pay their monthly maintenance fees. New York State threatened to foreclose on the property and evict the residents, which would mean the loss of their equity. However, cooperators stayed united and held out for 13 months (the longest and largest strike of its kind in United States history) before a compromise was finally reached, with mediation from then-Bronx Borough President Robert Abrams and then-New York Secretary of State Mario Cuomo. Cooperators would remit $20 million in back payments of maintenance fees, but they would get to take over management of the complex and set their own fees.

The shares of stock that prospective purchasers bought to enable them to occupy Co-op City apartments became the subject of protracted litigation, culminating in a United States Supreme Court decision United Housing Foundation, Inc. v. Forman. 57 residents sued because they had been charged for costs that were not described in a 1965 Information Bulletin seeking to attract residents for apartments in Co-op City. The Supreme Court held that federal courts have no jurisdiction of shares of stock that allow the purchaser to live in an apartment in Co-op City because they are not federally-regulated shares of commercial stock.

In 2004, Co-op City was financially unable to continue payments to HFA due to the huge costs of emergency repairs. New York Community Bank helped RiverBay satisfy its $57 million mortgage obligation, except for $95 million in arrears, by refinancing the loan later that same year. This led to the agreement that Co-op City would remain in the Mitchell-Lama Housing Program for at least seven more years as a concession on the arrears and that any rehabilitation that Co-op City took on to improve the original poor construction (which happened under New York State's watch) would earn credit toward eliminating the debt. By 2008, RiverBay had submitted enough proof of construction repairs to pay off the balance of arrears to New York State.

=== Renovations ===
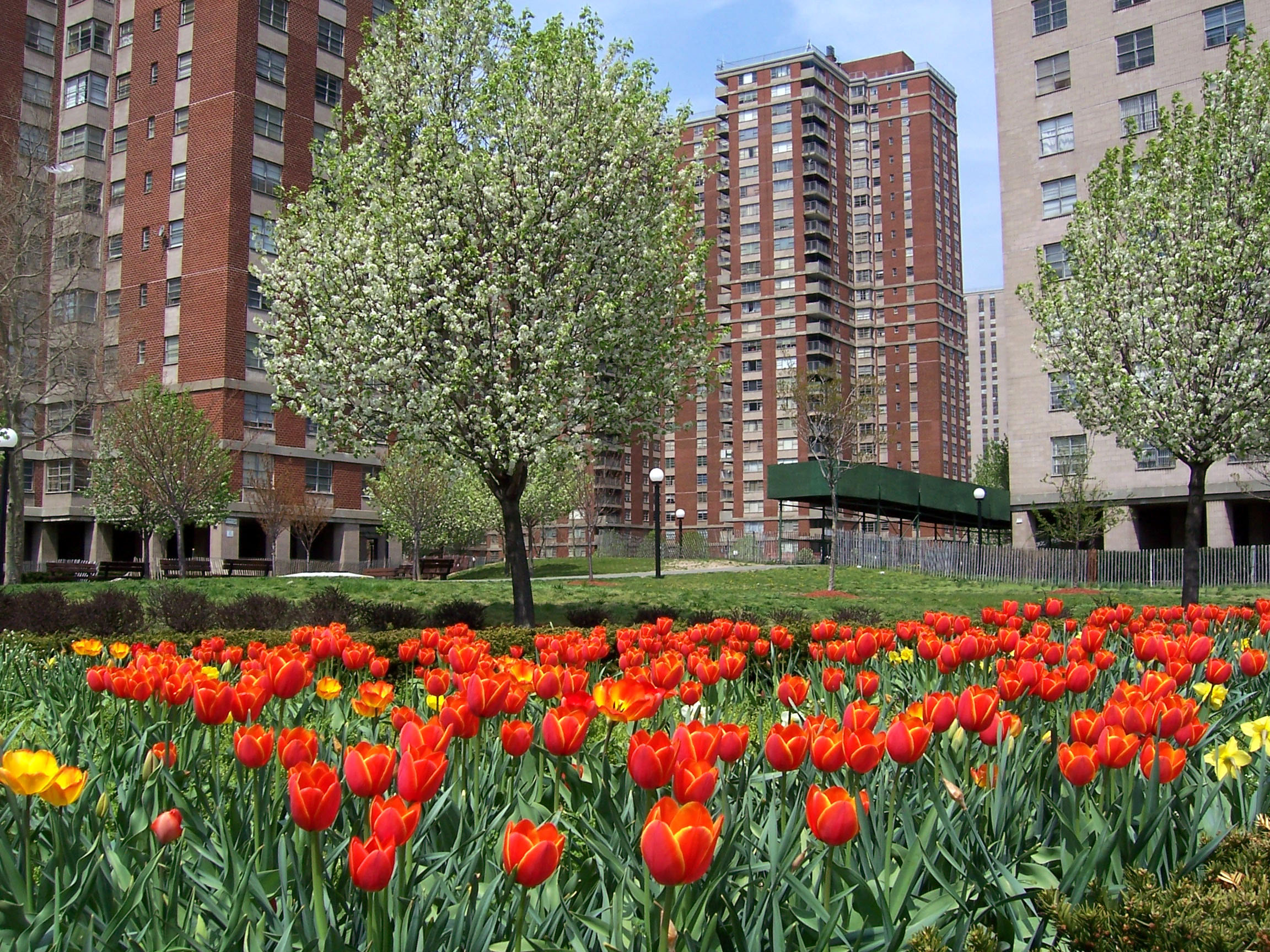
View from corner of Asch Loop/Co-op City Boulevard in 2006

Within the first decade of the 2000s, the aging development began undergoing a complex-wide $240 million renovation, replacing piping and garbage compactors, rehabilitating garages and roofs, upgrading the power plant, making facade and terrace repairs, switching to energy-efficient lighting and water-conserving technologies, replacing all 130,000 windows and 4,000 terrace doors (costing $57.9 million in material and labor) and all 179 elevators. The word "renaissance" is being used to describe this period in Co-op City history. Many of these efforts are also helping in the "greening" of the complex: the power-plant will be less polluting, the buildings will be more efficient and recycling efforts will become more extensive. The New York State Energy Research and Development Authority (NYSERDA) awarded its largest ever grant—$5.2 million—to the community under its NY Energy $mart Assisted Multifamily Program.

In 2003, after a partial collapse in one garage, inspectors found 5 of the 8 garages to be unsafe and ordered them closed for extensive repairs. The other 3 garages were able to remain partially open during repairs. To deal with the parking crisis, New York City allowed angled parking in the community, the large greenways in the complex were paved over to make outdoor parking lots and agreements were made with nearby shopping centers to use their extra parking spaces. All garages were re-opened by January 2008, and work began to restore the greenways that had been paved.

Financial responsibility for these upgrades was the subject of a protracted dispute between RiverBay and the State of New York. Co-op City was developed under New York's Mitchell-Lama Program, which subsidizes affordable housing. RiverBay charged that the state should help with the costs because of severe infrastructure failures stemming from the development's original shoddy construction, which occurred under the supervision of the state. The state countered that RiverBay was responsible for the costs because of its lack of maintenance over the years. In the end, a compromise had the state supplying money and RiverBay refinancing the mortgage, borrowing $480 million from New York Community Bank in 2004, to cover the rest of the capital costs.

In 2007, the power plant was in the process of upgrading from solely managing the electricity brought in from Con Edison to a 40-megawatt tri-generation facility with the ability to use oil, gas or steam (depending on market conditions) to power turbines to produce its own energy. The final cost of this energy independence could be as much as $90 million, but it is hoped to pay for itself with the savings earned—with conservative estimates at $18 million annually—within several years. Also, whatever excess power generated after satisfying the community's needs will be sold back to the electrical grid, adding another source of income for RiverBay.

In September 2007, a report by the New York Inspector General, Kristine Hamann, charged that the Division of Housing and Community Renewal (DHCR), which is responsible for overseeing Mitchell-Lama developments, was negligent in its duties to supervise the contracting, financial reporting, budgeting and the enforcement of regulations in Co-op City (and other M-L participants) during the period of January 2003 to October 2006. The report also chided Marion Scott management for trying to influence the RiverBay Board by financing election candidates and providing jobs and sports tickets to board members and their family/friends—all violations of DHCR and/or RiverBay regulations. The DHCR was instructed to overhaul its system of oversight to better protect the residents and taxpayer money.

In October 2007, a former board president, Iris Herskowitz Baez, and a former painting contractor, Nickhoulas Vitale, pleaded guilty to involvement in a kickback scheme. While on the RiverBay Board, Baez steered $3.5 million in subsidized painting contracts for needed work in Co-op City apartments, to Vitale's company, Stadium Interior Painting, in exchange for $100,000 in taxpayer money. Herskowitz Baez was sentenced to 6 months in jail and 12 months' probation and given a $10,000 fine in March 2008.

=== 2010s to present ===
During January 2015, an outbreak of Legionnaires' disease sickened 8 people near Co-op City's cooling towers. Twelve people were diagnosed with Legionnaires' disease between December 2014 and the end of the outbreak in January 2015. Another outbreak of Legionnaires' disease in 2018 sickened three people, one of whom died.

As a result of the continued presence of the amusement park zoning lot at Bartow and Baychester Avenues, there were no restrictions on the heights of signs on that lot. In late 2017, the site's owner began erecting tall LED billboards on the lot, a move opposed by Co-op City residents since one of the billboards faced Co-op City, keeping residents awake at night. The following year, residents proposed changing the lot's zoning to a standard commercial use. A tall wind turbine was erected on the lot in December 2019. The turbine toppled later that month, knocking down the billboard, but causing no injuries.

== Management ==
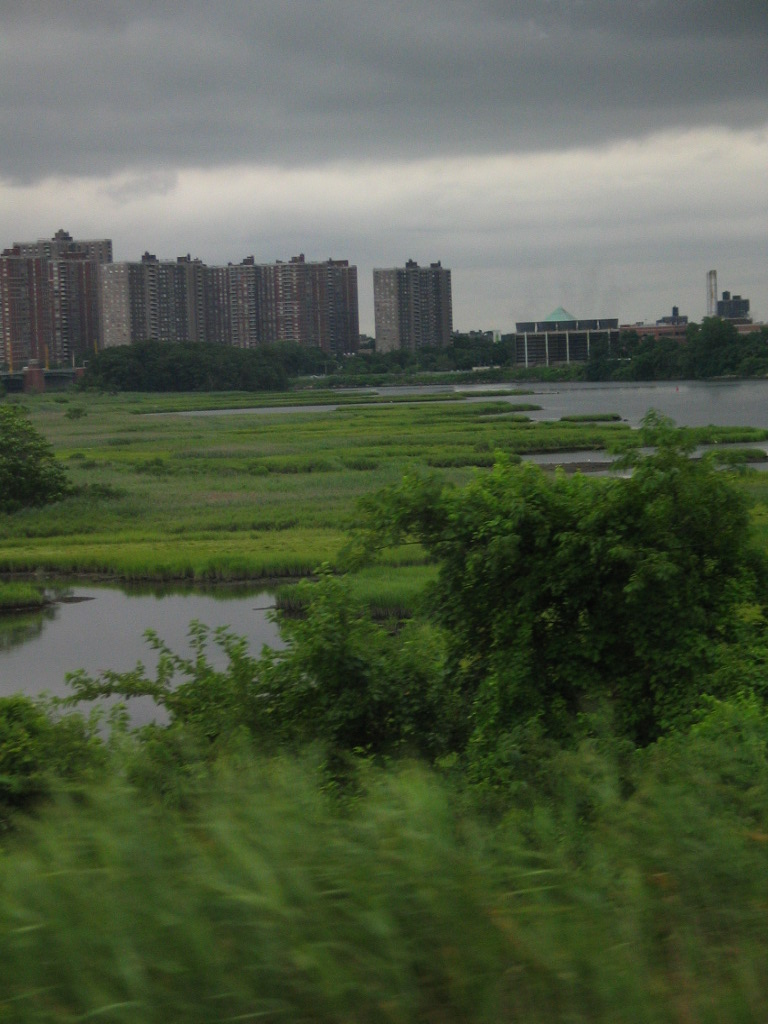
Co-op City in 2005

RiverBay Corporation is the corporation that operates the community and is led by a 15-member board of directors. As a cooperative development, the tenants run the complex through this elected board. There is no pay for serving on the board. The corporation employs over 1000 people and has 32 administrative and operational departments to serve the development.

The complex has its own Public Safety Department with more than 100 sworn officers. In December 2007, the cable television company Cablevision gave RiverBay permission to use its fiber optic cables in order to install additional surveillance cameras throughout the complex to be viewed at the Public Safety Command Center. In 2008, trained supervisors were granted the power to write summonses for parking and noise violations and Segways were acquired – along with bikes – to help the officers patrol during the warmer months.

Co-op City was managed by Marion Scott Real Estate, Inc. from October 1999 to November 2014. Before then the property was run by in-house general managers. The development is currently managed by Douglas Elliman Property Management.

There are two weekly newspapers serving the community: Co-op City Times (the official RiverBay paper) and City News.

=== Qualifications for resident application ===
When Co-op City first opened, the original residents were required to pay $450 per room in equity and subsequently $25 per room in carrying charges.

As of November 15, 2022, people who applied to live in Co-op City must meet the following requirements.

- Applicants must not have any criminal convictions for producing methamphetamine in the home
- Applicants must not be legally required to be a lifetime registrant on the state sex offender registry
- Applicants must have a FICO credit score of at least 650 or, if no credit score, documentation of bills paid consistently
- Applicants must be subject to a home visit during the application process
- Applicants' children must attend school if age 5+

The following requirements depend on the number of rooms and number of residents.

Number of rooms	Minimum residents	Maximum residents	Sales price	Monthly maintenance payment	Minimum annual income (age 18–61)	Minimum annual income (age 62+)	Maximum annual income (1–3 residents)	Maximum annual income (4+ residents)
3	1	2	$22,500	$807	$28,786	$26,370	$77,683	—
3.5	1	2	$26,250	$941	$33,472	$30,167	$89,957	—
4	1	2	$30,000	$1,007	$38,187	$34,158	$103,654	—
4.5	2	4	$33,750	$1,212	$43,027	$38,724	$115,850	$126,117
5	2	4	$37,500	$1,344	$47,781	$43,002	$121,409	$137,475
6	4	6	$45,000	$1,616	$57,315	$52,663	$145,157	$166,471
6.5	4	6	$48,750	$1,739	$62,141	$55,925	$156,315	$179,766

== Demographics ==
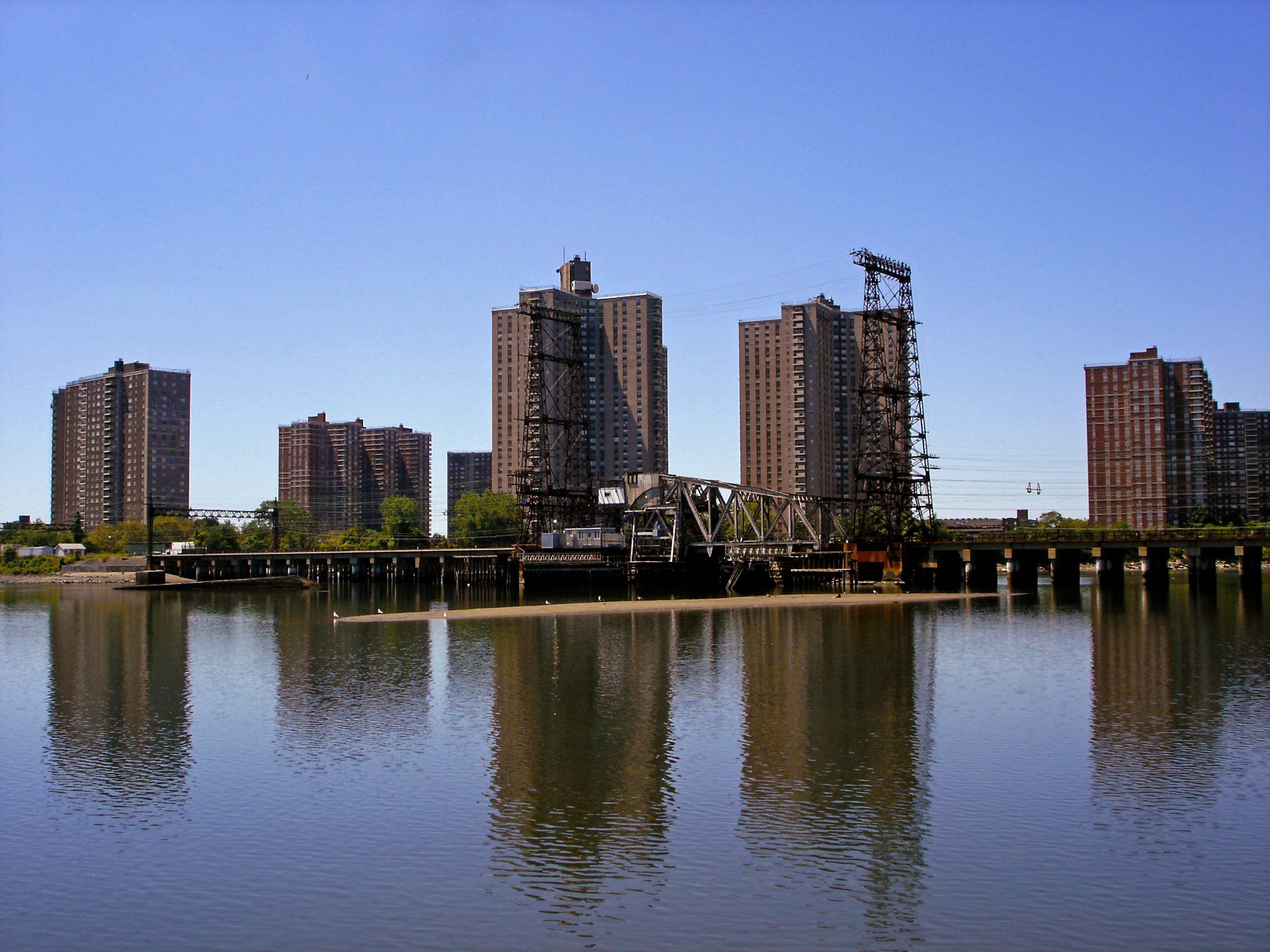
Co-op City in 2007, from the east

Based on data from the 2010 United States census, the population of Co-Op City was 43,752, an increase of 3,076 (7.6%) from the 40,676 counted in 2000. Covering an area of 857.55 acres (347.04 ha), the neighborhood had a population density of 51.0 inhabitants per acre (32,600/sq mi; 12,600/km^{2}). The racial makeup of the neighborhood was 8.5% (3,723) White, 60.5% (26,452) African American, 0.2% (108) Native American, 1.2% (522) Asian, 0.0% (7) Pacific Islander, 0.3% (125) from other races, and 1.6% (681) from two or more races. Hispanic or Latino of any race were 27.7% (12,134) of the population.

The entirety of Community District 10, which comprises City Island, Co-op City, Country Club, Pelham Bay, Schuylerville, Throgs Neck and Westchester Square, had 121,868 inhabitants as of NYC Health's 2018 Community Health Profile, with an average life expectancy of 81.1 years. This is about the same as the median life expectancy of 81.2 for all New York City neighborhoods. Most inhabitants are youth and middle-aged adults: 20% are between the ages of between 0–17, 26% between 25 and 44, and 27% between 45 and 64. The ratio of college-aged and elderly residents was lower, at 9% and 18% respectively.

As of 2017, the median household income in Community District 10 was $59,522. In 2018, an estimated 14% of Community District 10 residents lived in poverty, compared to 25% in all of the Bronx and 20% in all of New York City. One in eleven residents (9%) were unemployed, compared to 13% in the Bronx and 9% in New York City. Rent burden, or the percentage of residents who have difficulty paying their rent, is 45% in Community District 10, compared to the boroughwide and citywide rates of 58% and 51% respectively. Based on this calculation, as of 2018, Community District 10 is considered high-income relative to the rest of the city and not gentrifying.

With more than 8,300 residents aged 60 and older as of 2007, Co-op City is recognized as the naturally occurring retirement community (NORC) in the United States. Its Senior Services Program provides outreach to support aging residents, many of whom originally moved to the complex during their working years and remained after retirement.

Co-op City was home to a large Jewish community during its early years, as well as Italian Americans and Irish Americans; many of them had relocated from other areas of the Bronx, such as the Grand Concourse. With African Americans making up a large minority, the community became known for its ethnic diversity. As early tenants grew older and moved away, the newer residents reflected the current population of the Bronx, with African American and Hispanic residents comprising the majority of residents by 1987. In the 1990s, after the fall of the Soviet Union, the neighborhood received an influx of former Eastern Bloc émigrés, especially from Russia and Albania. In 2019, CUNY TV uploaded a video on YouTube called "Co-op City, The Bronx | DiverseCITY" speaking about the diverse demographics and they have mentioned there is also now a significant Asian population in the development alongside other ethnic and racial populations. This housing development also uploaded the same video on their own YouTube channel.

== Policing and crime ==
Co-Op city which is within Community District 10 is patrolled by the 45th Precinct of the NYPD, located at 2877 Barkley Avenue in Throggs Neck. The 45th Precinct ranked 28th safest out of 69 patrol areas for per-capita crime in 2010. As of 2018, with a non-fatal assault rate of 53 per 100,000 people, Community District 10's rate of violent crimes per capita is less than that of the city as a whole. The incarceration rate of 243 per 100,000 people is lower than that of the city as a whole.

The 45th Precinct has a lower crime rate than in the 1990s, with crimes across all categories having decreased by 67% between 1990 and 2022. The precinct reported five murders, 13 rapes, 235 robberies, 265 felony assaults, 108 burglaries, 609 grand larcenies, and 323 grand larcenies auto in 2022.

== Public safety ==
The Co-op City Department of Public Safety is a privately owned and operated safety & security force whose mission is to protect the residents, visitors and property of Co-op City. Co-op City Department of Public Safety currently employs about 100 NYC special patrolmen (peace officers). Special patrolmen have very limited peace officer authority in connection with their special assignment of employment pursuant to New York State Criminal Procedure Law § 2.10 sub 27 and Co-op City management policies. Co-op City special patrolmen authority is limited to the employee's geographical area of employment and only while such employee is working as defined in Chapter 13 subsection (C).. All Special patrolmen are required to comply with the New York City Police Department's rules and requirements to receive special patrolman status. Co-op City special patrolmen are issued a pistol license by the New York City Police Department and carry a firearm while performing their special assignment only.

The New York City Police Department is the primary policing and investigation agency within New York City as per the NYC Charter, which includes Co-op City.

== Fire safety ==
Co-op City is served by the New York City Fire Department (FDNY)'s Engine Co. 66/Ladder Co. 61 fire station at 21 Asch Loop.

== Health ==
As of 2018, preterm births are more common in Community District 10 than in other places citywide, though births to teenage mothers are less common. In Community District 10, there were 110 preterm births per 1,000 live births (compared to 87 per 1,000 citywide), and 10.3 births to teenage mothers per 1,000 live births (compared to 19.3 per 1,000 citywide). Community District 10 has a low population of residents who are uninsured. In 2018, this population of uninsured residents was estimated to be 7%, lower than the citywide rate of 14%, though this was based on a small sample size.

The concentration of fine particulate matter, the deadliest type of air pollutant, in Community District 10 is 0.0075 milligrams per cubic metre (7.5×10^{−9} oz/ft^{3}), the same as the city average. Fourteen percent of Community District 10 residents are smokers, which is the same as the city average . In Community District 10, 24% of residents are obese, 13% are diabetic, and 37% have high blood pressure—compared to the citywide averages of 24%, 11%, and 28% respectively. In addition, 25% of children are obese, compared to the citywide average of 20%.

Eighty-seven percent of residents eat some fruits and vegetables every day, which is the same as the city's average of 87%. In 2018, 77% of residents described their health as "good", "very good", or "excellent", about the same as the city's average of 78%. For every supermarket in Community District 10, there are 7 bodegas.

The nearest large hospitals are Calvary Hospital, Montefiore Medical Center's Jack D. Weiler Hospital, and NYC Health + Hospitals/Jacobi in Morris Park. The Albert Einstein College of Medicine campus is also located in Morris Park.

== Post offices and ZIP Code ==
Co-op City is located within ZIP Code 10475. The United States Postal Service operates three post offices in Co-op City:

- Co-op City Station – 3300 Conner Street
- Dreiser Loop Station – 179 Dreiser Loop
- Einstein Station – 127 Einstein Loop

== Parks ==
The largest open space in Co-op City itself is the Greenway, which is located in the superblock connecting all of the buildings. The majority of Co-op City was built atop Rattlesnake Creek, a small stream that emptied into the Hutchinson River to the east. A small nature preserve called the Givans Creek Woods is located at the northern portion of Co-op City, near the intersection of Baychester Avenue and Co-op City Boulevard. Despite its name, which is derived from Scottish immigrant Robert Givan, it is located above Rattlesnake Creek.

Co-op City Field, located on the waterfront of Hutchinson River at Co-op City Boulevard north of Bellamy Loop North, contains two baseball fields. Directly to the south is a proposed 1.4-acre (0.57 ha) waterfront park, which was announced in 2017 and is still in the planning stages.

== Education ==
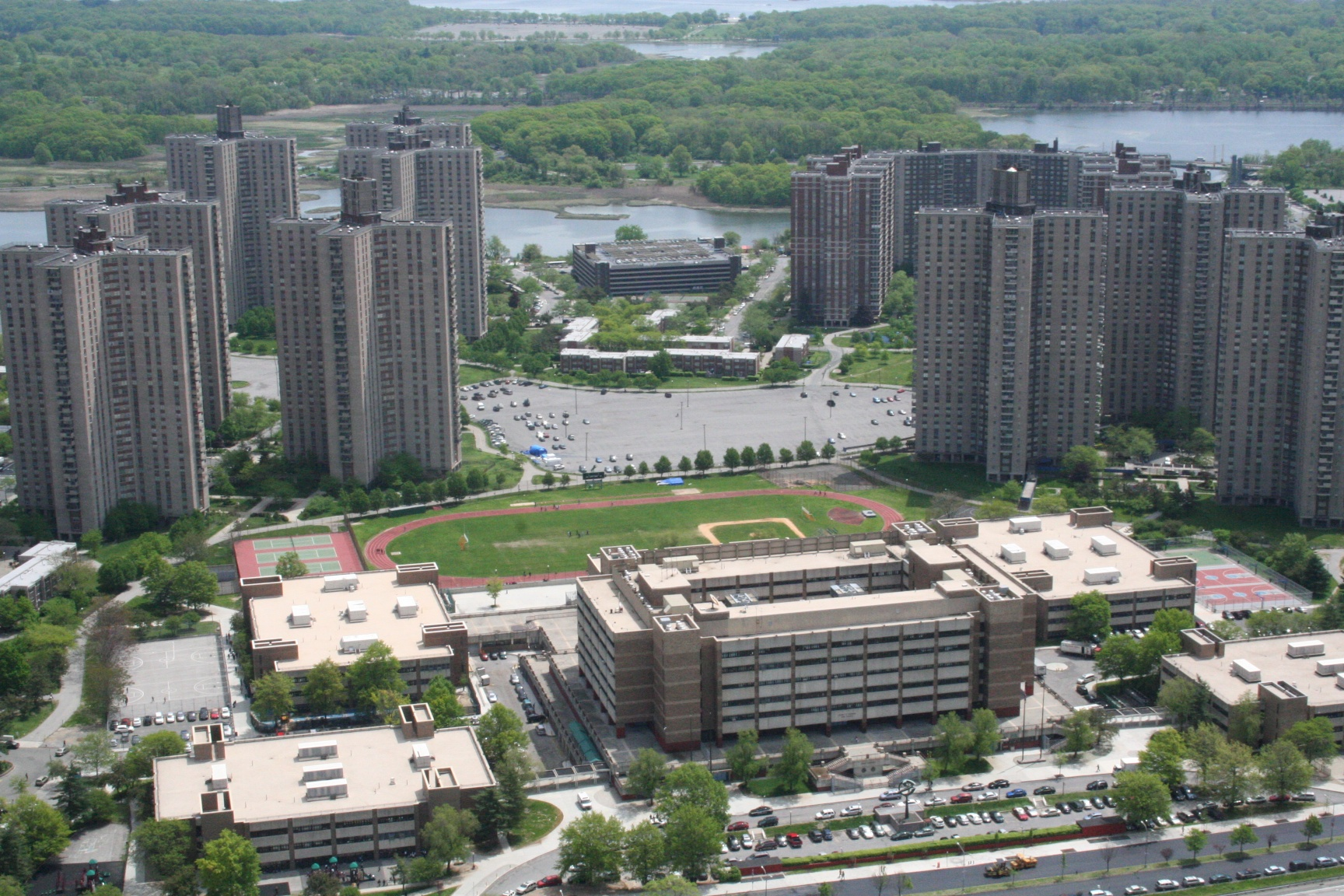
Aerial view in 2009, with Harry S Truman High School in foreground

Community District 10 generally has a lower rate of college-educated residents than the rest of the city as of 2018. While 34% of residents age 25 and older have a college education or higher, 16% have less than a high school education and 50% are high school graduates or have some college education. By contrast, 26% of Bronx residents and 43% of city residents have a college education or higher. The percentage of Community District 10 students excelling in math rose from 29% in 2000 to 47% in 2011, and reading achievement increased from 33% to 35% during the same time period.

Community District 10's rate of elementary school student absenteeism is slightly higher than the rest of New York City. In Community District 10, 21% of elementary school students missed twenty or more days per school year, a little more than the citywide average of 20%. Additionally, 75% of high school students in Community District 10 graduate on time, the same as the citywide average of 75%.

=== Schools ===
The New York City Department of Education operates the following public schools in Co-op City:

- PS 153 Helen Keller (grades PK–5)
- PS 160 Walt Disney (grades PK–5)
- PS 176 (grades PK–10)
- PS 178 Dr Selman Waksman (grades K–5)
- MS 180 Dr Daniel Hale Williams (grades 6–8)
- IS 181 Pablo Casals (grades 6–8)
- Harry S Truman High School (grades 9–12)
- Bronx Health Sciences High School (grades 9–12)

=== Library ===
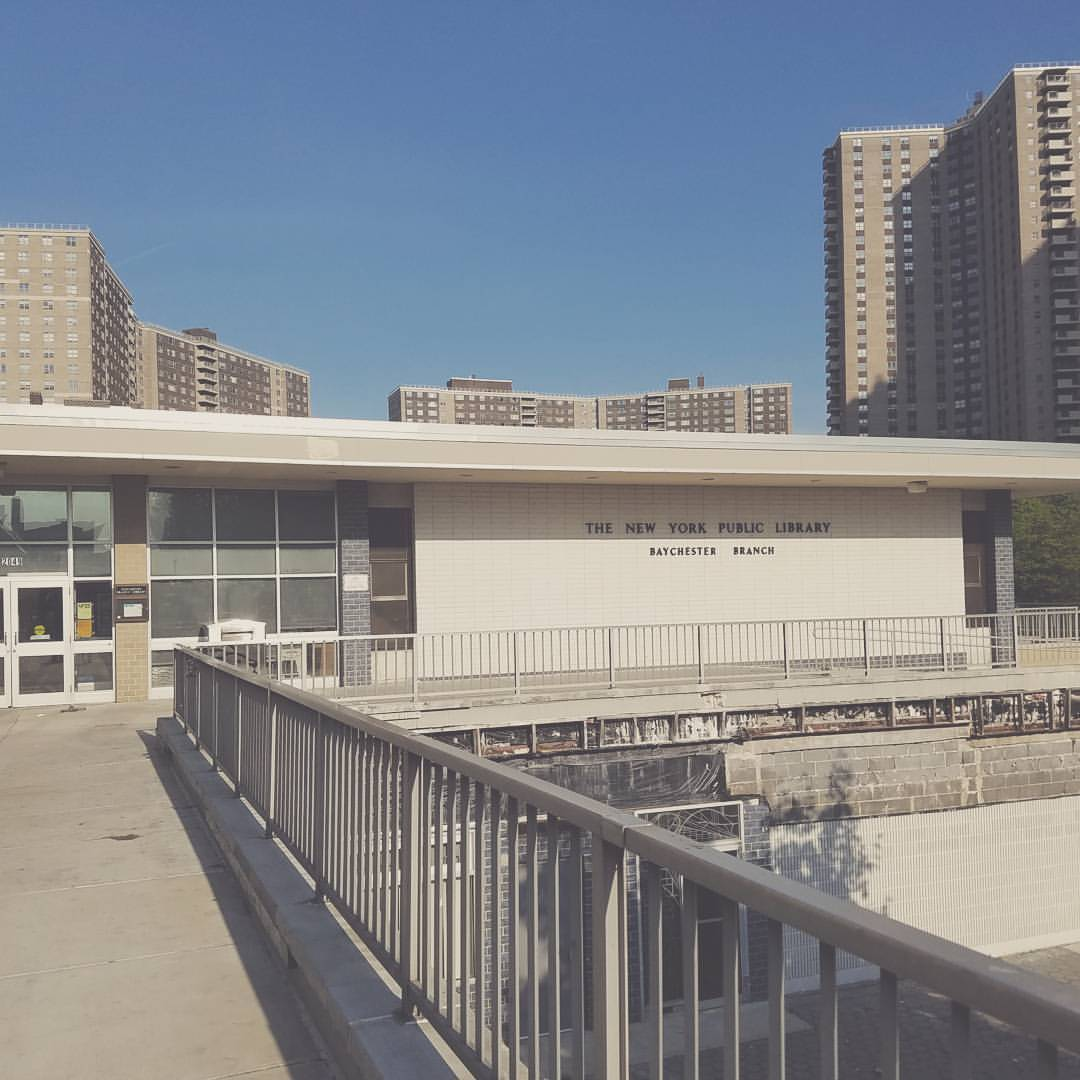
New York Public Library, Baychester branch

The New York Public Library (NYPL)'s Baychester branch is located at 2049 Asch Loop North. The one-story branch building opened in 1973 and was renovated in 2003.

== Transportation ==
Co-op City is served by several MTA Regional Bus Operations routes. (Note that sections 1-2-3-4-5 corresponds to Dreiser, Carver, Bellamy, Asch, and Einstein Loops, respectively; buses pull into Asch and Dreiser Loops directly.)

- Bx5: to Bay Plaza Shopping Center or Simpson Street station (2 and 5 trains) (via Crosby Avenue, Bruckner Boulevard, and Story Avenue; serves Bay Plaza weekends only)
- Bx12: to Bay Plaza Shopping Center to University Heights (via Fordham Road and Pelham Parkway)
- Bx12 SBS: to Bay Plaza Shopping Center or Inwood–207th Street station (A train) (via Fordham Road and Pelham Parkway)
- Bx23: to Pelham Bay Park station (6 and <6> trains) (loop via sections 1-2-3-4-5)
- Bx25: to Bay Plaza Shopping Center or Bedford Park (via sections 4–5, Allerton Avenue)
- Bx26: to Earhart Lane or Bedford Park (via sections 1–2–3, Allerton Avenue)
- Bx28: to Earhart Lane or Fordham Center (via sections 1–2–3, Gun Hill Road)
- Bx30: to Earhart Lane or Pelham Parkway station (2 and 5 trains) (via sections 2-1-4-5, Boston Road)
- Bx38: to Bay Plaza Shopping Center or Norwood–205th Street station (D train) (via sections 4–5, Gun Hill Road)
- Q50: to Earhart Lane or Flushing–Main Street station (7 and <7> trains) (via sections 2–3–5, Bronx–Whitestone Bridge; serves Co-op City rush hours only)
- BxM7: express to Dreiser Loop or Midtown Manhattan (via sections 1-2-3-4-5, Bruckner Expressway, Fifth Avenue/Madison Avenue)

Currently, there are no subway or Metro-North commuter rail stations in Co-op City (a plan to extend the IRT Pelham Line to Co-op City as part of the 1968 Program for Action ran out of money). However, as part of the Penn Station Access project to extend Metro-North service to New York Penn Station, the MTA plans to build the Co-op City station, an idea that has been proposed since the 1970s.

== Notable residents ==
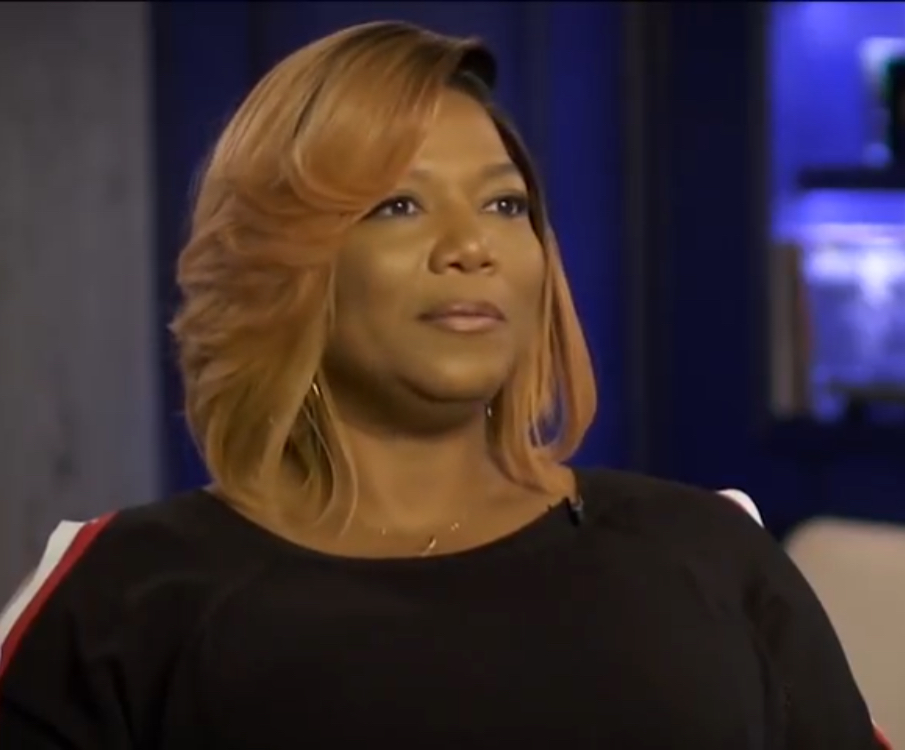
Queen Latifah

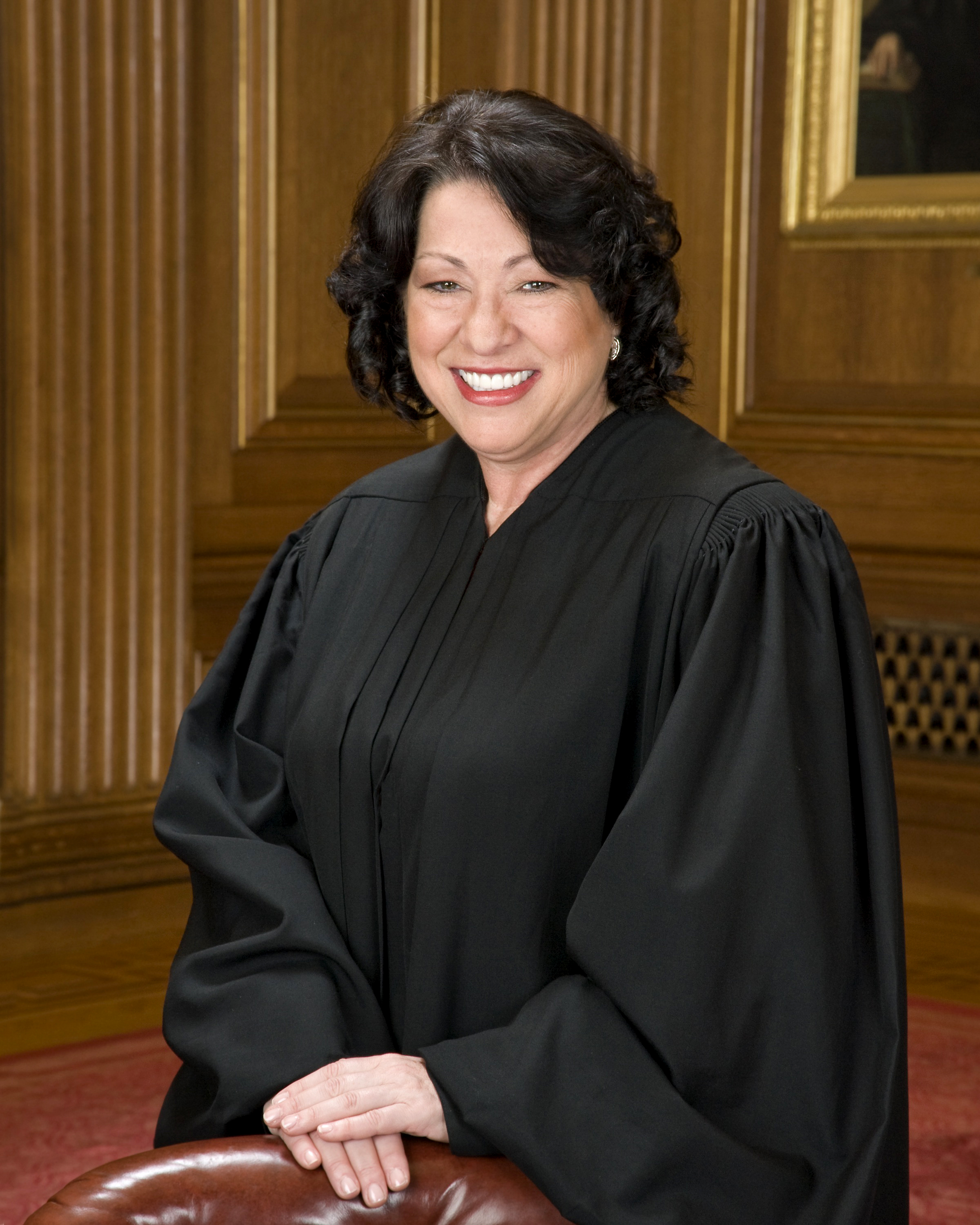
Sonia Sotomayor

- Brian Ash (born 1974), screenwriter/producer (resided in Co-op City from 1974 to 1993)
- Jamaal Bailey, politician
- Earl Battey (1935–2003), former baseball player with the Chicago White Sox and Washington Senators (later renamed the Minnesota Twins).
- David Berkowitz (born 1953), "Son of Sam" Killer (resided in Co-op City from 1968 to 1971)
- Big Tigger (born 1972), radio and television personality
- Kurtis Blow (born 1959), old school hip hop pioneer (resided in the Broun Place Townhouses during the mid-1980s)
- Chris Canty (born 1982), professional football player for the New York Giants
- Eddie Carmel (1936–1972), entertainer, known as "The Jewish Giant", his claimed height of 9 feet made him an instant celebrity with traveling circuses. At the time of his death in 1972, he resided with his parents at 100 Elgar Place.
- Christopher Scott Cherot (born 1967), screenwriter/director (resided in Co-op City from 1970 to 1981)
- Cormega (born 1970), rapper
- Eliot Engel (born 1947), United States Congressman who represented New York's 17th congressional district.
- Frank Andre Guridy (born 1971), historian, author, and Professor of History at Columbia University.
- Stan Jefferson (born 1962), professional baseball outfielder from 1983 to 1991.
- Queen Latifah (born 1970), actress and rapper (resided in Co-op City from 1980 to 1984)
- Miles Marshall Lewis (born 1970), African-American author (resided in Co-op City from 1974 to 1996)
- Tamika Mallory (born 1980), activist
- Melina Matsoukas (born 1981), music video, film, commercial, and television director.
- Mwalim (born 1968), performing artist, writer, and professor of English at the University of Massachusetts Dartmouth
- Sean Nelson (born 1980), actor
- Jourdana Phillips (born 1990), model.
- Richard Price (born 1949), novelist and screenwriter.
- Sally Regenhard (born 1946), mother of firefighter Christian Regenhard, and activist for families of the victims of the September 11 terrorist attacks.
- Christopher Rose (born 1957), professor of engineering and associate dean of faculty at Brown University
- Tricia Rose (born 1962), academic, scholar of hip hop; Chancellor's Professor of Africana Studies, Brown University
- Larry Seabrook (born 1951), former New York City Councilman
- Sonia Sotomayor (born 1954), Associate Justice of the United States Supreme Court
- Rod Strickland (born 1966), former NBA basketball player
- Ron Suno (born 2000), rapper.
- Kenneth P. Thompson (1966–2016), former District Attorney for Kings County

== See also ==
- Community Home Entertainment
- Cooperative Village
- LeFrak City
- Mitchell-Lama Housing Program
- Park La Brea, Los Angeles
- Parkchester, Bronx
- Parkfairfax, Virginia
- Parkmerced, San Francisco
- Penn South
- Riverton Houses
- Rochdale Village, Queens
- Starrett City, Brooklyn
- Stuyvesant Town–Peter Cooper Village
