= Community Home Entertainment =

American cable television company

- Company type: Private
- Founded: 1983 (as a cable company, defunct 2007)
- Headquarters: The Bronx, New York, United States
- Products: Analog Cable; Digital Cable; High Speed Internet
- Website: https://web.archive.org/web/20061130143939/http://chesma.com/

Community Home Entertainment (CHE) is a former American cable television company which began providing analog cable services to the Bronx, New York, in 1983 with most customers residing in Co-op City. Since then they have grown rapidly extending their offerings to broadband Internet and digital cable services.

== History ==
Co-op City built-in TV cable network of the 35 buildings made set-top antennas unworkable when the state's largest Mitchell-Lama complex was built in the pre-cable 1960s, so each unit was connected by cable to a master antenna to receive broadcast TV channels free and in-house channels for a fee. CHE had only 16 employees dynamically servicing thousands of cable and high-speed Internet customers. CHE provided television services at affordable rates below the competition. Around 2004 the company launch digital cable service. Future plans were to include VOIP home calling, but that never happened. Cablevision purchased CHE in 2007, and agreed to spend $300,000 in building improvements to the cable infrastructure. Cablevision was purchased by Altice USA in 2015.
