= Rod Strickland =

American basketball player and coach (born 1966)

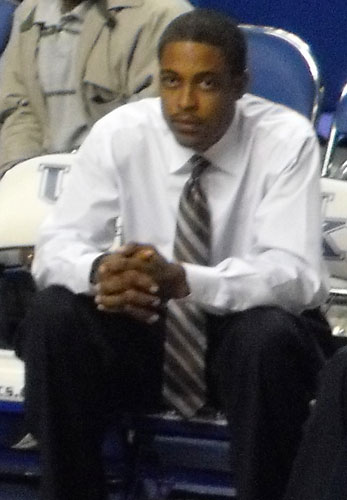
- Strickland as an assistant coach for the Kentucky Wildcats in 2009

LIU Sharks
- Title: Head coach
- League: NEC

Personal information
- Born: July 11, 1966 (age 60) The Bronx, New York, U.S.
- Listed height: 6 ft 3 in (1.91 m)
- Listed weight: 185 lb (84 kg)

Career information
- High school: Truman (The Bronx, New York); Oak Hill Academy (Mouth of Wilson, Virginia)
- College: DePaul (1985–1988)
- NBA draft: 1988: 1st round, 19th overall pick
- Drafted by: New York Knicks
- Playing career: 1988–2005
- Position: Point guard / shooting guard
- Number: 11, 1, 31
- Coaching career: 2014–present

Career history

Playing
- 1988–1990: New York Knicks
- 1990–1992: San Antonio Spurs
- 1992–1996: Portland Trail Blazers
- 1996–2001: Washington Bullets / Wizards
- 2001: Portland Trail Blazers
- 2001–2002: Miami Heat
- 2002–2003: Minnesota Timberwolves
- 2003–2004: Orlando Magic
- 2004: Toronto Raptors
- 2005: Houston Rockets

Coaching
- 2009-2010: Kentucky (assistant)
- 2014–2017: South Florida (assistant)
- 2022–present: Long Island

Career highlights
- As player: All-NBA Second Team (1998); NBA All-Rookie Second Team (1989); NBA assists leader (1998); Third-team All-American – UPI (1988); First-team Parade All-American (1985); As coach: NEC regular season champion (2026); NEC tournament (2026); NEC Coach of the Year (2026)

Career NBA statistics
- Points: 14,463 (13.2 ppg)
- Rebounds: 4,084 (3.7 rpg)
- Assists: 7,987 (7.3 apg)
- Stats at NBA.com
- Stats at Basketball Reference

Rodney Strickland (born July 11, 1966) is an American basketball coach and former professional player. He is currently the head coach at Long Island University. Prior to LIU, he served as the program manager for the NBA G League's professional path. Strickland played college basketball for the DePaul Blue Demons, earning All-American honors. He had a long career in the National Basketball Association (NBA), playing from 1988 to 2005. Strickland was an assistant coach for the South Florida Bulls, under Orlando Antigua from 2014 to 2017. He formerly served in an administrative role for the University of Kentucky basketball team under head coach John Calipari and was the director of basketball operations at the University of Memphis under Calipari. He is the godfather of current NBA player Kyrie Irving. Strickland was inducted into the New York City Basketball Hall of Fame with the Class of 2008.

== High school career ==
A native of the Bronx, Strickland played for the New York Gauchos. While a junior he led Truman High School in Co-Op City to the state championship and was ranked as one of the top 10 high school recruits in the nation. As a senior, he transferred to Oak Hill Academy in Virginia.

== College career ==
Strickland became a college star at DePaul University where he appeared in 87 games. As a junior, he was a First Team All-American after averaging 20.0 points and 7.8 assists. A 1987 and 1988 All-America pick, Strickland helped lead the Blue Demons to three-straight NCAA Tournament appearances from 1985–86 to 1987–88, including Sweet Sixteen showings in 1986 and 1987. He ranks among the program's career leaders in scoring average (8th; 16.6 ppg), assists (3rd; 557) and steals (2nd; 204). He also averaged 3.4 rebounds while shooting 53.4% during his college career.

== NBA career ==
=== New York Knicks (1988–1990) ===
He was selected in the first round of the 1988 NBA draft by his hometown New York Knicks, where he backed up point guard Mark Jackson, the 1988 NBA Rookie of the Year. Nevertheless, Jackson and Strickland shared time that season. Strickland played in all 82 games and averaged 8.9 points and 3.9 assists in 16.8 minutes per game where he was named to the NBA All-Rookie Second Team.

=== San Antonio Spurs (1990–1992) ===
The Knicks dealt Strickland to the San Antonio Spurs for veteran Maurice Cheeks in the middle of the 1989–1990 season. Strickland flourished in San Antonio. The Spurs went 18–6 with him in the starting lineup. He led the Spurs in assists 26 times and averaged 12.3 points and 11.2 assists in 10 playoff games.

In the 1990–91 season Strickland lived up to his expectations as an exciting performer when he was healthy. He missed 24 games that year because of a sore ankle and a broken bone in his right hand. In the 58 games he played, Strickland averaged 13.8 points and 8.0 assists, shooting .482 from the field and .763 from the free throw line. He led the Spurs in assists 46 times and in steals 30 times. Strickland finished the year tied with Terry Porter for 12th in the NBA in assists. In a four-game series loss to the Golden State Warriors in the first round of the 1991 NBA playoffs, he posted 18.8 points, 5.3 rebounds, 8.8 assists, and 2.25 steals in 42.0 minutes per game.

Starting the 1991–92 NBA season in a contract dispute with the Spurs management, Strickland did not play in the first 24 games of the season. He finally signed on December 23, then started 54 of 57 games and averaged 13.8 points, 8.6 assists, 4.6 rebounds, and 2.07 steals in 36.0 minutes per game. He scored in double figures 48 times and scored 20 or more points on eight occasions. He notched a then career-high 28 points against the Indiana Pacers on February 6 and made a career-high 19 assists versus the Minnesota Timberwolves on March 3. Strickland started two playoff games against the Phoenix Suns before missing the third with a broken bone in his left hand. The Suns swept the series in three games.

=== Portland Trail Blazers (1992–1996) ===
Before the start of the 1992–93 season, Strickland signed as a free agent with the Portland Trail Blazers.

On April 5, 1994, Strickland set a Trail Blazers record with 20 assists in a single game, during a 135–113 win over the Phoenix Suns.

On January 24, 1995, Strickland set a career high with 36 points scored, on 15-21 shooting from the field, in a 105–99 loss to the Knicks. During that year's playoffs, Strickland averaged 23.3 points and 12.3 assists per game in a first round loss to the Suns.

On April 5, 1996, Strickland scored 27 points and recorded 12 assists in a 110-102 Game 1 loss to the Utah Jazz. The Trail Blazers eventually lost the series 3–2, and the series was contested until Game 5, when Strickland scored only 10 points while missing 11 of his 16 shots, as the Jazz won 102–64.

Despite regular season success in Portland, Strickland and the Trail Blazers never advanced out of the first round in the playoffs. In four seasons with the Blazers, Strickland averaged 17 points and 8.6 assists per game.

=== Washington Bullets/Wizards (1996–2001) ===
Strickland and teammate Harvey Grant were traded to the Washington Bullets for Rasheed Wallace and Mitchell Butler in 1996. In his first season in Washington, Strickland averaged 17.2 ppg and 8.9 apg helping the Bullets make the playoffs in 1997 for the first time in 8 seasons.

In 1997–98, Strickland had the best season of his career as he averaged 17.8 ppg and a league leading 10.5 apg. During the year, Strickland also became only the 25th player in NBA history to record 10,000 points and 5,000 assists. Strickland was selected to the second All-NBA team. While his individual stats improved over the next few seasons for the Wizards, the team got worse, leading to a buyout of his contract.

=== Last seasons and retirement (2001–2005) ===
Strickland returned to the Portland Trail Blazers in 2001. He finished his playing career with the Miami Heat, Minnesota Timberwolves, Orlando Magic, Toronto Raptors, and the Houston Rockets. He played in 1,094 games (740 starts) and scored over 14,000 points and tallied nearly 8,000 assists. He also ranked among the NBA's top 10 in assists per game in 1991–92 (5th), 1993–94 (6th), 1994–95 (5th), 1995–96 (4th), 1996–97 (5th), 1997–98 (1st), and 1998–99 (2nd).

Strickland averaged 13.2 points, 3.7 rebounds, 7.3 assists, 1.5 steals and 30.7 minutes of floor time per game.

== NBA career statistics ==
Legend
GP	Games played	GS	Games started	MPG	Minutes per game
FG%	Field goal percentage	3P%	3-point field goal percentage	FT%	Free throw percentage
RPG	Rebounds per game	APG	Assists per game	SPG	Steals per game
BPG	Blocks per game	PPG	Points per game	**Bold**	Career high
*	Led the league

=== Regular season ===
Year	Team	GP	GS	MPG	FG%	3P%	FT%	RPG	APG	SPG	BPG	PPG
1988–89	New York	81	10	16.8	.467	.322	.745	2.0	3.9	1.2	.0	8.9
1989–90	New York	51	0	20.0	.440	.286	.638	2.5	4.3	1.4	.2	8.4
1989–90	San Antonio	31	24	36.2	.468	.222	.615	4.3	8.0	1.8	.2	14.2
1990–91	San Antonio	58	56	35.8	.482	.333	.763	3.8	8.0	2.0	.2	13.8
1991–92	San Antonio	57	54	36.0	.455	.333	.687	4.6	8.6	**2.1**	**.3**	13.8
1992–93	Portland	78	35	31.7	**.485**	.133	.717	4.3	7.2	1.7	**.3**	13.7
1993–94	Portland	**82**	58	35.2	.483	.200	.749	4.5	9.0	1.8	**.3**	17.2
1994–95	Portland	64	61	35.4	.466	.374	.745	5.0	8.8	1.9	.1	**18.9**
1995–96	Portland	67	63	37.7	.460	.342	.652	4.4	9.6	1.4	.2	18.7
1996–97	Washington	**82**	**81**	36.5	.466	.169	.738	4.1	8.9	1.7	.2	17.2
1997–98	Washington	76	76	**39.7**	.434	.250	.726	**5.3**	**10.5***	1.7	**.3**	17.8
1998–99	Washington	44	43	37.1	.416	.286	.746	4.8	9.9	1.7	.1	15.7
1999–00	Washington	69	67	31.7	.429	.048	.702	3.8	7.5	1.4	**.3**	12.6
2000–01	Washington	33	28	30.9	.426	.250	.782	3.2	7.0	1.3	.1	12.2
2000–01	Portland	21	0	16.7	.418	.000	.577	1.7	3.4	.5	.0	4.6
2001–02	Miami	76	64	30.2	.443	.308	.766	3.1	6.1	1.1	.1	10.4
2002–03	Minnesota	47	8	20.3	.432	.091	.738	2.0	4.6	1.0	.1	6.8
2003–04	Orlando	46	9	19.9	.454	.303	.750	2.6	4.0	.6	.2	6.8
2003–04	Toronto	15	1	18.8	.333	.000	.682	2.5	3.9	.5	**.3**	4.7
2004–05	Houston	16	2	12.3	.209	**.500**	**.900**	1.7	2.4	.2	.1	1.8
Career		1,094	740	30.7	.454	.282	.721	3.7	7.3	1.5	.1	13.2

=== Playoffs ===
Year	Team	GP	GS	MPG	FG%	3P%	FT%	RPG	APG	SPG	BPG	PPG
1989	New York	9	0	12.3	.449	**1.000**	.529	1.4	2.8	.4	.1	6.0
1990	San Antonio	**10**	**10**	38.4	.425	.000	.556	5.3	11.2	1.4	.0	12.3
1991	San Antonio	4	4	**42.0**	.433	.000	.810	5.3	8.8	**2.3**	.0	18.8
1992	San Antonio	2	2	40.0	.**591**	—	.625	3.5	9.5	1.5	**1.0**	15.5
1993	Portland	4	4	39.0	.423	.000	.833	**6.5**	9.3	1.3	.5	13.5
1994	Portland	4	4	38.5	.500	.000	.815	4.0	9.8	1.0	.5	**23.5**
1995	Portland	3	3	**42.0**	.415	.400	.778	4.0	**12.3**	1.0	.7	23.3
1996	Portland	5	5	40.4	.440	.500	.639	6.2	8.4	1.0	.0	20.6
1997	Washington	3	3	41.3	.423	.500	.737	6.0	8.3	1.0	.0	19.7
2001	Portland	2	0	9.5	.333	—	.667	2.0	1.0	1.0	.0	4.0
2003	Minnesota	6	0	12.2	.524	—	**1.000**	1.0	2.8	.7	.3	4.7
Career		52	35	30.7	.446	.286	.706	4.0	7.5	1.1	.2	13.4

== Coaching career ==
In September 2008, Strickland was inducted into the New York City Basketball Hall of Fame along with NBA stars Kenny Anderson and Sam Perkins, coach Pete Gillen and pioneers Lou Bender and Eddie Younger.

Strickland started his coaching career as director of basketball operations at the University of Memphis, taking over the job held by former NBA player Milt Wagner. Strickland was hired as an assistant coach at USF under former Kentucky assistant coach Orlando Antigua from 2014 to 2017.

Strickland also previously served in an administrative role at the University of Kentucky under then-coach John Calipari in 2009.

== Head coaching record ==
Record table
Season	Team	Overall	Conference	Standing	Postseason
LIU Sharks (Northeast Conference) (2022–present)
2022–23	LIU	3–26	1–15	9th	
2023–24	LIU	7–22	6–10	7th	
2024–25	LIU	17–16	12–4	2nd	
2025–26	LIU	24–11	15–3	1st	NCAA Division I Round of 64
2026–27	LIU	1–7	0–0		
LIU:		52–82 (.388)	34–32 (.515)		
Total:		52–82 (.388)			
National champion Postseason invitational champion Conference regular season champion Conference regular season and conference tournament champion Division regular season champion Division regular season and conference tournament champion Conference tournament champion

== Personal life ==
Strickland is the godfather of the 2011 NBA draft first overall pick and 2012 Rookie of the Year Kyrie Irving. Strickland's son, Tai, played college basketball for Georgia Southern (2022–23) after previously playing for Wisconsin (2018–19) and Temple (2020–21 & 2021–22). His son Terell played for James Madison (2020–). Strickland also has a daughter.

=== Arrests and legal issues ===
In 1997, while Strickland was playing for the Washington Wizards, he was arrested in Washington D.C and charged with a DUI and disorderly conduct. He pled guilty to driving while impaired. In 1999, he was arrested again for reckless driving and DUI; he failed field sobriety tests and refused a Breathalyzer test. Strickland was acquitted at trial. In 2000, he was arrested for disorderly conduct at a D.C. club. He was arrested a third time for DUI in January 2001, for which he pled guilty and spent 10 days in jail.

On September 11, 2001, Strickland and singer Chico DeBarge had criminal complaints for assault filed against them after a fight outside a TGI Friday's in Maryland. Strickland's portion of the case was dismissed in 2004.

== See also ==
- List of National Basketball Association career steals leaders
- List of National Basketball Association career turnovers leaders
