= Lavelle School for the Blind =

Private school for the blind

Coordinates: 40°52′55″N 73°51′13″W

Lavelle School for the Blind is a special education school in the Bronx, New York City. It serves children and young adults who have visual impairments and other disabilities between 3 and 21 years old. The school offers four main programs – Preschool, Elementary, Secondary, and Transition – as well as a summer program so students can continue learning year-round. Attendance is free for families, the school is funded by New York State through the 4201 and 4410 programs.

== History ==
It was established in 1904 by a Catholic blind woman, Margaret Coffey, and it was formerly known as the Catholic Institute for the Blind. It formally became a Catholic school in 1909 with the Dominican Sisters of Blauvelt beginning to operate the school in 1911. It moved to its current facility in 1916. It was renamed in 1938 in honor of Monsignor Lavelle. New York state authorities began funding the school in 1942. For a period it served as a boarding school; boarding ended in 1983.

In 1995 it had 101 students.

In 2020 it had 125 students. That year, as the COVID-19 pandemic in New York occurred, the Roman Catholic Archdiocese of New York gave the school $2,500 so it could buy seven tablet computers tailored to the school's needs.

== Curriculum ==
In 1995 it had academic and life skills classes. It has a special Individual Education Program, with its own diplomas, for multiply impaired students.

== Admissions ==
Admissions and placement is approved by the Committee on Preschool Special Education and the Committee on Special Education depending on the age of the student.

== Activities ==
The school began offering baseball as a sport in 2020.
