= Sade Baderinwa =

American journalist and news anchor at WABC-TV

- Born: Folasade Olayinka Baderinwa; April 14, 1969 (age 57); Baltimore, Maryland, U.S.
- Education: University of Maryland, College Park
- Occupations: Television news anchor, Television journalist
- Employer: The Walt Disney Company
- Television: WABC-TV (2003–present)

Folasade Olayinka Baderinwa (born April 14, 1969), known professionally as Sade Baderinwa (/ˈʃɑːdeɪ ˈbɑːdərɪnwɑː/ SHAH-day BAH-dər-in-wah), is an American broadcast journalist. Since 2003, she has been a news anchor at WABC-TV, the ABC flagship station in New York, and currently co-anchors the weekday 5 p.m. and 11 p.m. newscasts of Eyewitness News with Mike Marza.

== Early life ==
Baderinwa was born to a Nigerian father and a German mother. At age seven, her mother no longer took part in her life and her father returned to Africa, leaving her in the custody of a family friend. She was subsequently adopted in Baltimore by WBAL-TV anchor Edie House, whose parents also provided additional support. When Baderinwa was 12, her birth mother eventually took her in to live with her family in nearby Montgomery County. She has since continued to maintain contact with her biological parents, as well as with her adoptive family.

Baderinwa graduated from the University of Maryland, College Park's College of Agriculture and Natural Resources with a degree in agricultural business and resource economics.

== Career ==
=== Early career ===
Baderinwa began her career as a production assistant for ABC News' various programs, including This Week With David Brinkley, Nightline, World News Tonight, and News One. She went on to become a reporter trainee at WUSA-TV, the CBS affiliate in Washington, D.C., before becoming a reporter at WSLS-TV, the NBC affiliate in Roanoke, Virginia.

Baderinwa joined WBAL-TV, the NBC affiliate in Baltimore, in February 2000. There, she anchored the morning and noon newscasts and also hosted a weekly community affairs show.

=== 2003–present: WABC-TV ===
In 2003, Baderinwa joined WABC-TV as a reporter and anchor for the station's noon newscast before joining Diana Williams as co-anchor of the 5 p.m. newscast.

On the evening of July 23, 2004, while preparing a report on location outside of 257 Hudson Street in Hackensack, New Jersey about local flooding, she was struck by a hit and run driver who went through police lines, and was rendered unconscious following the collision. After undergoing multiple surgeries and months of physical therapy, Baderinwa returned on-air on December 13, 2004, but continued receiving physical therapy five times a week following her return. The driver in the collision was never caught.

On October 27, 2006, Baderinwa appeared on The View as a guest co-host.

In May 2011, Baderinwa became co-anchor of the 11 p.m. newscast with Bill Ritter, replacing Liz Cho, who vacated the slot to anchor the station's new 4 p.m newscast, which debuted after the end of The Oprah Winfrey Show.

She has also been a regular moderator at the United Nations' celebration of International Women's Day.

== See also ==
- New Yorkers in journalism
