= Bay Plaza Shopping Center =

Shopping mall in the Bronx, New York

Coordinates: 40°52′4″N 73°49′31″W

- Location: The Bronx, New York
- Opened: 1988
- Owner: Prestige Properties
- Num. of stores: 100+
- Num. of anchor tenants: 6
- Floor area: 2,000,000 square feet (190,000 m^{2})
- Floors: 3 (Mall at Bay Plaza), 1 (other sections)

Bay Plaza Shopping Center is a shopping center on the south side of Co-op City in the Bronx, New York City. In addition to various department stores and shops, such as Macy's, JCPenney, and Old Navy, it has a multiplex movie theater, several restaurants, a fitness club, and some office space. Constructed from 1987 to 1988 by Prestige Properties, the shopping center is located between Bartow and Baychester Avenues, just outside Sections 4 and 5 of Co-op City, on an open lot that was the site of the Freedomland U.S.A. amusement park between 1960 and 1964. The Bay Plaza Shopping Center is the largest shopping center in New York City. Since opening over 35 years ago, it has become extremely successful, the center claims to hold some of the highest performing stores on a per-square-foot basis for many national retailers.

== Expansion ==
The Mall at Bay Plaza is an expansion project of the Bay Plaza Shopping Center. The 780,000 square feet (72,000 m^{2}) center encloses a fashion mall with stores like JCPenney, Macy's and over 100 specialty stores and food court as well as a 1,800-car parking garage. It opened on August 14, 2014. The Mall at Bay Plaza is the first enclosed anchored fashion mall opened in the New York City area in almost 40 years after Queens Center opened in 1973. The developer hired the Los Angeles-based architectural firm Altoon & Porter Architects as the builder, and also hired Aurora Contractors — a New York-based firm — as Construction Manager.

The mall, which is located at the Hutchinson River Parkway and I-95, has helped grow what is already the city's largest shopping center (now 1,300,000 square feet (120,000 m^{2})) to approximately 2,000,000 square feet (190,000 m^{2}) upon its summer 2014 completion. A new 160,000 square feet (15,000 m^{2}), three-level Macy's and the existing 150,000 square feet (14,000 m^{2}) JCPenney anchors the development, which also has a 1,800-car parking garage. An H&M store, the first in the borough, opened in the mall. It created more than 2,000 construction jobs and 1,700 permanent jobs. It costs US$65 million.
