= Norwood, Bronx =

Neighborhood in New York City

Norwood
- Neighborhood of the Bronx
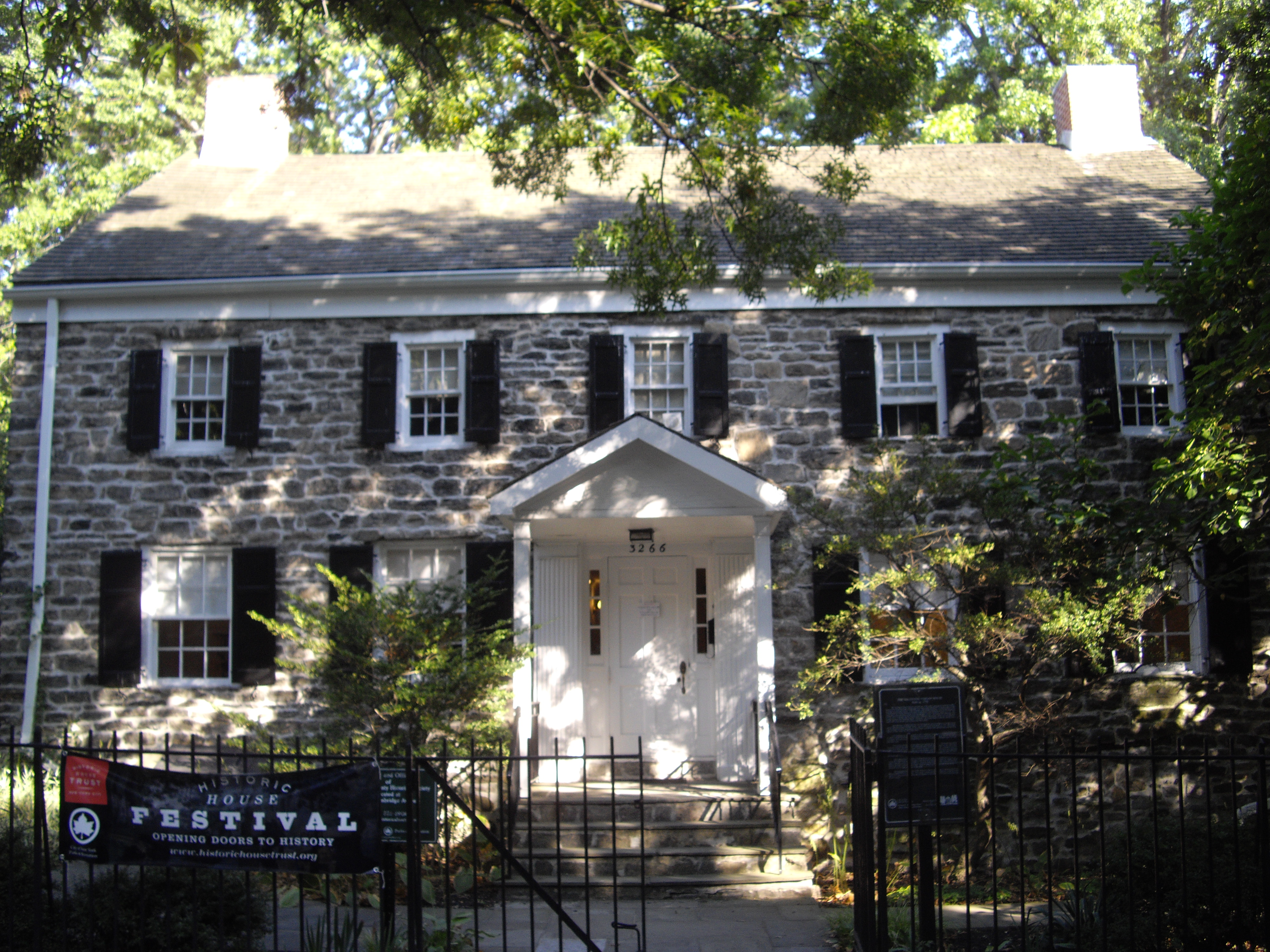
- Valentine–Varian House
- Location in New York City
- Coordinates: 40.878°N 73.878°W
- Country: United States
- State: New York
- City: New York City
- Borough: Bronx
- Community District: Bronx 7

Area
  - Total: 0.525 sq mi (1.36 km^{2})

Population (2010)
  - Total: 40,494
  - Density: 77,100/sq mi (29,800/km^{2})

Economics
  - Median income: $37,465
- ZIP Codes: 10467
- Area code: 718, 347, 929, and 917
- Website: norwood.nyc

Norwood, also known as Bainbridge, is a residential neighborhood in the northwest Bronx, New York City, U.S. It is bound by Van Cortlandt Park and Woodlawn Cemetery to the north, the Bronx River to the east, and Mosholu Parkway to the southwest. The area is dominated topographically by what was once Valentine's Hill, the highest point being near the intersection of 210th Street and Bainbridge Avenue, where Gun Hill Road intersects, and around the Montefiore Medical Center, the largest landowner and employer of the neighborhood. Norwood's main commercial arteries are Gun Hill Road, Jerome Avenue, Webster Avenue, and Bainbridge Avenue.

The neighborhood is part of Bronx Community District 7 and is patrolled by the NYPD's 52nd Precinct. As of the 2000 United States census, the seven census tracts that make up the neighborhood had a population of 40,748.

== Name ==
Due to its use in city publications, subway maps, and local media, "Norwood" is the neighborhood's more common name, but the area is also known as "Bainbridge", most consistently within the neighborhood's formerly Irish American community that is centered on the commercial zone of Bainbridge Avenue and East 204th Street. The name "Norwood" itself does not carry a great deal of currency as do nearby neighborhoods such as Riverdale and Woodlawn.

== History ==
At the time of the Civil War, the area was Westchester County farmland on the border of West Farms and Yonkers. Chief property owners included the Valentine, Varian, and Bussing families. Woodlawn Cemetery was founded in 1863 to the north. Annexed to New York City in 1873 along with the rest of the West Bronx, the area's character shifted from rural to suburban by the turn of the 20th century. The neighborhood's streets in their present form were laid out in 1889 by Josiah Briggs between Middlebrook Parkway (renamed Mosholu Parkway) and Woodlawn Cemetery. Contemporary maps show that it was then considered part of Williamsbridge, with which it continues to share a post office. Williamsbridge Reservoir was opened in 1890, transforming the natural lake into an artery that served the New York City water supply system until no longer needed in 1934.

A 19-acre (7.7 ha) tract of land, known as "Columbia Oval" was owned by Columbia University at Gun Hill Road and Bainbridge Avenue. Columbia Oval was used for sporting events including the first United States marathon (40 km), from Stamford, Connecticut in 1896. (The winner of that marathon was John McDermott, who later won the first Boston Marathon.) Columbia Oval became the site of Columbia University's War Hospital, which was taken over by the United States Army as "U.S. Army General Hospital No. 1" during the World War I.

The area went through a series of names around the turn of the 20th century, including North Bedford Park, after the neighborhood to the south, and Brendan Hill, after St. Brendan the Navigator and the parish church, established in 1908, that bears his name. The name Brendan Hill was made official by the Board of Aldermen in 1910. The name Norwood is first attributed in the form Norwood Heights—either in honor of Carlisle Norwood, a friend of Leonard Jerome, or simply a contraction of "North Woods", common to a number of places in the English-speaking world.

In the first half of the 20th century Norwood shared with the rest of the Bronx a population made up largely of European-origin Catholic, Protestant, and Jewish families affluent enough to leave Manhattan. These populations were joined by Puerto Ricans during the Great Depression and post World War II eras, and, post-1965, by other Latinos (especially Dominicans), Bangladeshis, Albanians, West Indians (especially Guyanese), West Africans (especially Ghanaians), and a new group of Irish immigrants.

=== Irish population ===
In the 1970s through the 1990s the neighborhood was well known for its Irish and Irish American population, having attracted a number of immigrants from Catholic areas of Northern Ireland who fled the Troubles, and others seeking work. During this time that the neighborhood became known by two more names: Bainbridge, after the Bainbridge Avenue – East 204th Street commercial strip – included Irish restaurants, groceries, and pubs, and Little Belfast, after the city from which many immigrants came.

The area contributed much in Irish and Irish-American culture and politics during this time. The musical group Black 47, made up of Irish expatriates, first made their name touring the bar scene here. Their lyrics would go on to reflect the experiences of the Irish in the area, in such songs as "Funky Ceílí", "Her Dear Donegal", and "Rockin' the Bronx". Irish pubs in the area attracted press attention as centers of strong support for Irish republicanism, which supports ending the remaining British rule in Ireland. A few pubs hosted benefits for Noraid, the Northern Irish Aid Committee, accused by Unionists of gun running for the Irish Republican Army (IRA). At least one area bar, The Phoenix, was raided by law enforcement in 1994, with Irish authorities simultaneously raiding its owner's holiday home in Donegal. Thomas Maguire, the owner, and five others, were charged with smuggling thousands of bomb detonators to Ireland from Tucson via New York. A jury found the defendants not guilty on all counts.

A number of factors have contributed to the decline of the Irish population in Bainbridge. The most critical was the downturn in the US economy which forced many Irish immigrants to return to Ireland or to seek work in Germany (whose reunification process coincided with the American recession). A substantial portion of the Irish population were illegally in the country, and thus subject to INS investigation and deportation. The end of the Troubles period, with the signing of the Good Friday Agreement, encouraged some residents to return voluntarily to Ireland, particularly with the improvement of the northern economy. The growth of the economy of the Republic of Ireland – the so-called "Celtic Tiger" – persuaded some residents to move there. Others have continued to live in New York, moving to the Bronx neighborhoods of Riverdale and Woodlawn Heights, or to nearby Yonkers. The same factors which encouraged return to Ireland have also discouraged further immigration to Bainbridge. Most of the Irish American residents moved out of the area due to over-population and the area becoming an economically depressed neighborhood. Irish pubs were replaced by "99 Cent" stores. The last Irish pub, McDwyers Pub, closed down in 2011.

== Demographics ==
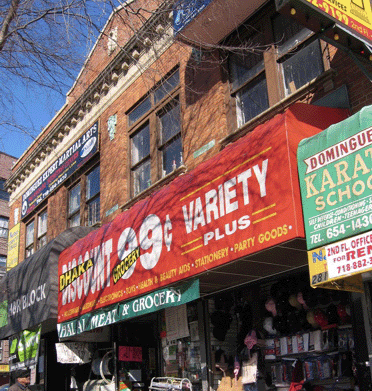
Storefronts along East 204th Street

=== 2010 Census ===
Based on data from the 2010 United States census, the population of Norwood was 40,494, a decrease of 323 (0.8%) from the 40,817 counted in 2000. Covering an area of 360.93 acres (146.06 ha), the neighborhood had a population density of 112.2 inhabitants per acre (71,800/sq mi; 27,700/km^{2}).

The racial makeup of the neighborhood was 9.9% (3,998) White, 17.9% (7,262) African American, 0.3% (114) Native American, 11.0% (4,451) Asian, 0.0% (9) Pacific Islander, 0.7% (264) from other races, and 1.5% (611) from two or more races. Hispanic or Latino of any race were 58.7% (23,785) of the population.

The entirety of Community District 7, which comprises Norwood and Bedford Park, had 148,163 inhabitants as of NYC Health's 2018 Community Health Profile, with an average life expectancy of 79.4 years. This is lower than the median life expectancy of 81.2 for all New York City neighborhoods. Most inhabitants are youth and middle-aged adults: 26% are between the ages of between 0–17, 31% between 25 and 44, and 23% between 45 and 64. The ratio of college-aged and elderly residents was lower, at 11% and 9% respectively.

As of 2017, the median household income in Community District 7 was $35,355. In 2018, an estimated 26% of Norwood and Bedford Park residents lived in poverty, compared to 25% in all of the Bronx and 20% in all of New York City. One in seven residents (14%) were unemployed, compared to 13% in the Bronx and 9% in New York City. Rent burden, or the percentage of residents who have difficulty paying their rent, is 61% in Norwood and Bedford Park, compared to the boroughwide and citywide rates of 58% and 51% respectively. Based on this calculation, as of 2018, Norwood and Bedford Park are considered low-income relative to the rest of the city and not gentrifying.

=== 2000 Census ===
As of the 2000 United States census, the seven census tracts that make up the neighborhood had a population of 40,748. The racial makeup of the neighborhood was 32.66% White, 22.27% African American, 0.90% Native American, 9.01% Asian, 0.09% Pacific Islander, 28.23% from other races, and 1.59% from two or more races. 52.78% of the population were Hispanic or Latino of any race. 21.17% were Puerto Rican and 8.84% Dominican.

The median income for a household in the neighborhood was $28,724, and the median income for a family was $29,679. Males had a median income of $24,876 versus $20,814 for females. The per capita income for the neighborhood was $13,550.

35.15% of the population, (14,324 individuals), were foreign born. Another 8.55% were born in Puerto Rico, and were thus considered by some to be native born. Of the foreign born, 32.46% were born in the Caribbean, 13.95% in South America, 11.64% in South Central Asia, 11.44% in Central America, 11.35 in Eastern Europe, 5.35% in Southeast Asia, 3.60% in East Asia, 3.00% in West Africa, 0.84% in Southern Europe, 0.72% in Western Asia, and 0.71% in Western Europe. The countries which are represented by at least 2.5% (358 individuals) of the neighborhood's foreign born population are the Dominican Republic (21.17%), Mexico (7.81%), Jamaica (6.49%), Ecuador (5.65%), Bangladesh (5.42%), Guyana (4.64%), the Philippines (4.52%), Albania (4.07%), Ireland (3.00%), and Pakistan (2.81%).

Based on sample data from the same census, the U.S. Census Bureau estimates that 37.44% of the population 5 and older speak only English at home. 46.15% speak Spanish at home, either exclusively or along with English. Other languages spoken at home by more than 0.5% of the population of Norwood include Tagalog (1.89%), Urdu (0.93%), Korean (0.79%), French (0.68%), Serbo-Croatian (0.69%), Chinese (0.60%) and Gujarati (0.58%). In addition, 2.69% speak "Other Indic languages" (mainly Bengali), 2.47% speak "Other Indo-European languages" (mainly Albanian), 0.85% speak "African languages", and 0.56% speak "Other Slavic languages" (mainly Bulgarian).

== Politics ==
Norwood is a part of New York City's 11th City Council district, represented by Eric Dinowitz.

In 2022, after redistricting resulting from the 2010 Census, there were major changes in the other levels of government representation. The neighborhood was absorbed into New York State Senate District 33, represented by Gustavo Rivera. The neighborhood was split for the New York State Assembly between two districts: the 80th Assembly District, represented by John Zaccaro Jr., and the 81st Assembly District, represented by Jeffrey Dinowitz. Additionally, it became a part of New York's 15th congressional district, represented by Ritchie Torres. All its representatives are members of the Democratic Party.

== Landmarks ==
- Montefiore Medical Center
- Williamsbridge Oval, commonly referred as "the Oval" or "Oval Park", is a park that features children's playgrounds, dog runs, basketball and tennis courts, and a football field (doubling as a soccer pitch). From the late 19th century into the early part of the 20th century, the Oval was an active reservoir, distributing water to the North Bronx.
- The Keeper's House at Williamsbridge Reservoir, built in 1889, which was then bought and restored by the Mosholu Preservation Corporation for use as a community space. Both houses have been named landmarks by the New York City Landmarks Commission. It is also the headquarters of the Norwood News.
- The Valentine–Varian House, a fieldstone farmhouse built in 1758, which now houses the Museum of Bronx History.
- St. Brendan's Church and School, founded in 1908, including the St. Brendan's School of Music.
- The Shrine Church of St. Ann, founded in 1927, including the School of St. Ann (merged in 2012 in a regional system).
- Mosholu Library, a branch of the New York Public Library
- The Lenru

== Police and crime ==
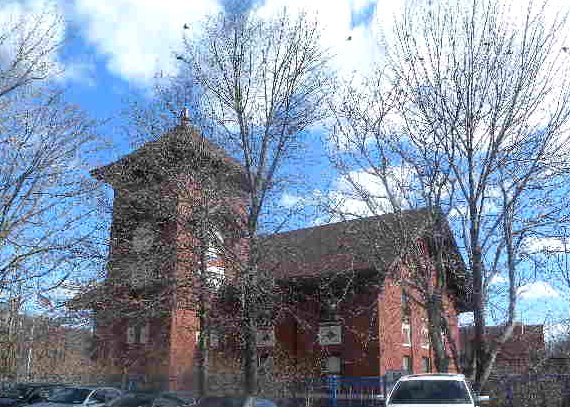
NYPD 52nd Precinct building at 3016 Webster Avenue

Norwood and Bedford Park are patrolled by the 52nd Precinct of the NYPD, located at 3016 Webster Avenue. The 52nd Precinct ranked 49th safest out of 69 patrol areas for per-capita crime in 2010. As of 2018, with a non-fatal assault rate of 97 per 100,000 people, Norwood and Bedford Park's rate of violent crimes per capita is greater than that of the city as a whole. The incarceration rate of 583 per 100,000 people is higher than that of the city as a whole.

The 52nd Precinct has a lower crime rate than in the 1990s, with crimes across all categories having decreased by 76.1% between 1990 and 2022. The precinct reported 14 murders, 37 rapes, 410 robberies, 598 felony assaults, 192 burglaries, 666 grand larcenies, and 254 grand larcenies auto in 2022.

The reported crimes for year 2019 include 8 murders; 34 rapes; 363 robberies; 564 felony assaults; 184 burglaries; 726 grand larceny; and 78 grand larceny auto.

== Fire safety ==
Norwood is located near two New York City Fire Department (FDNY) fire stations. Engine Co. 79/Ladder Co. 37/Battalion 27 is located at 2928 Briggs Avenue. Engine Co. 62/Ladder Co. 32 is located at 3431 White Plains Road.

== Health ==
As of 2018, preterm births are less common in Norwood and Bedford Park than in other places citywide, though births to teenage mothers are more common. In Norwood and Bedford Park, there were 85 preterm births per 1,000 live births (compared to 87 per 1,000 citywide), and 30.3 births to teenage mothers per 1,000 live births (compared to 19.3 per 1,000 citywide). Norwood and Bedford Park has a relatively average population of residents who are uninsured. In 2018, this population of uninsured residents was estimated to be 16%, higher than the citywide rate of 12%.

The concentration of fine particulate matter, the deadliest type of air pollutant, in Norwood and Bedford Park is 0.0078 milligrams per cubic metre (7.8×10^{−9} oz/ft^{3}), more than the city average. Twelve percent of Norwood and Bedford Park residents are smokers, which is lower than the city average of 14% of residents being smokers. In Norwood and Bedford Park, 33% of residents are obese, 19% are diabetic, and 35% have high blood pressure—compared to the citywide averages of 24%, 11%, and 28% respectively. In addition, 25% of children are obese, compared to the citywide average of 20%.

84% of residents eat some fruits and vegetables every day, which is less than the city's average of 87%. In 2018, 67% of residents described their health as "good", "very good", or "excellent", lower than the city's average of 78%. For every supermarket in Norwood and Bedford Park, there are 18 bodegas.

The Montefiore Medical Center and North Central Bronx Hospital are located in Norwood.

== Post office and ZIP Code ==
Norwood is part of ZIP Code 10467. The United States Postal Service operates the Van Cott Station at 3102 Decatur Avenue.

== Education ==
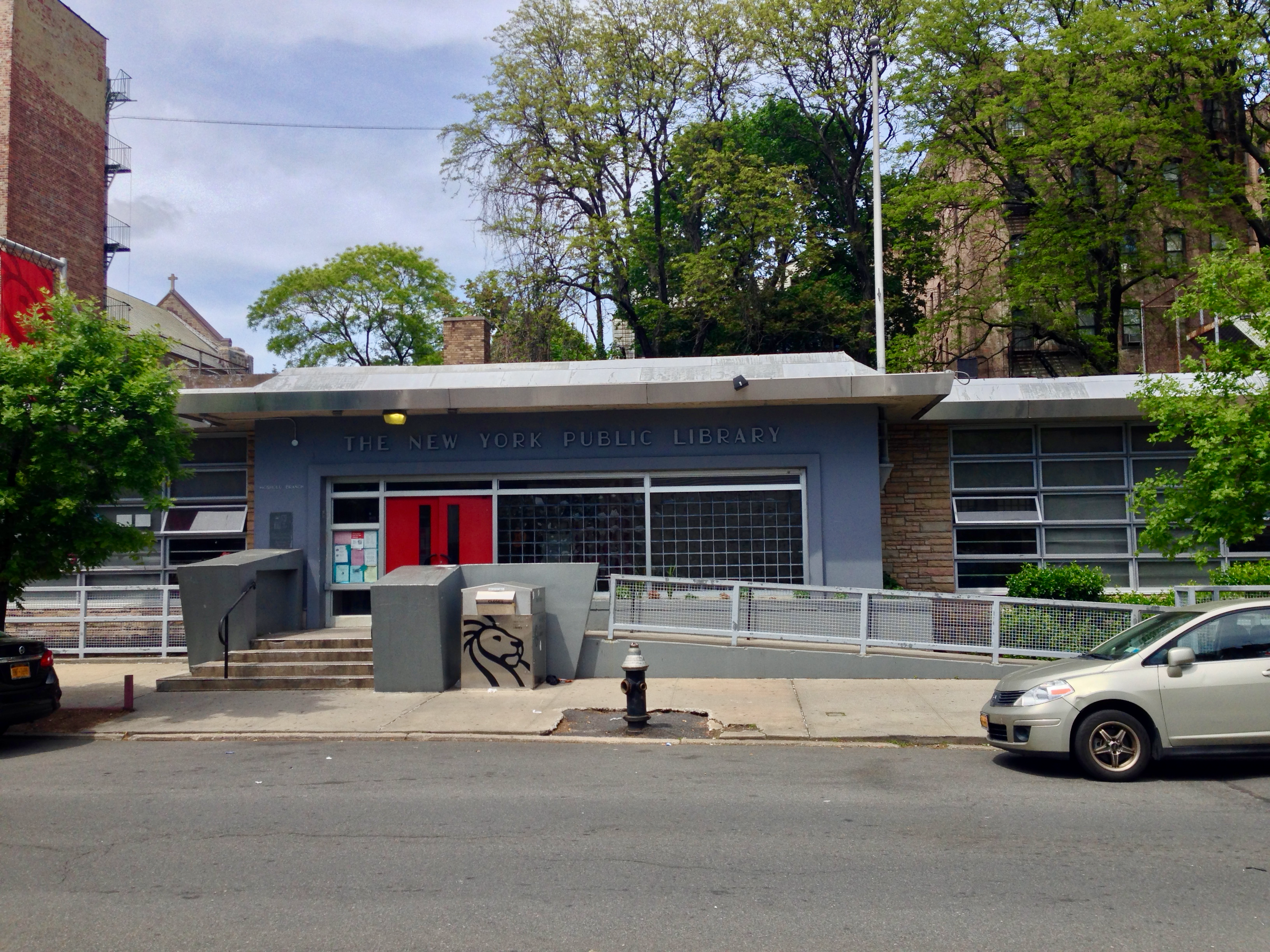
New York Public Library, Mosholu branch

Norwood and Bedford Park generally have a lower rate of college-educated residents than the rest of the city as of 2018. While 23% of residents age 25 and older have a college education or higher, 32% have less than a high school education and 45% are high school graduates or have some college education. By contrast, 26% of Bronx residents and 43% of city residents have a college education or higher. The percentage of Norwood and Bedford Park students excelling in math rose from 21% in 2000 to 48% in 2011, and reading achievement increased from 28% to 33% during the same time period.

Norwood and Bedford Park's rate of elementary school student absenteeism is more than the rest of New York City. In Norwood and Bedford Park, 28% of elementary school students missed twenty or more days per school year, higher than the citywide average of 20%. Additionally, 70% of high school students in Norwood and Bedford Park graduate on time, lower than the citywide average of 75%.

=== Schools ===
New York City Department of Education operates public schools in the area. The zoned neighborhood schools are PS/MS 280 Mosholu Parkway (grades K-8) and PS 56 (grades K-5). Area students attend several high schools, including Evander Childs High School and DeWitt Clinton High School. St. Brendan's School is an area Catholic K–8 school. C. J. Hughes of The New York Times stated that according to residents of the Norwood area, the high schools in the community were "hit-or-miss".

=== Library ===
The New York Public Library (NYPL) operates the Mosholu branch at 285 East 205th Street. The branch opened in 1955 and contains two floors: a ground floor and a basement.

== Transportation ==
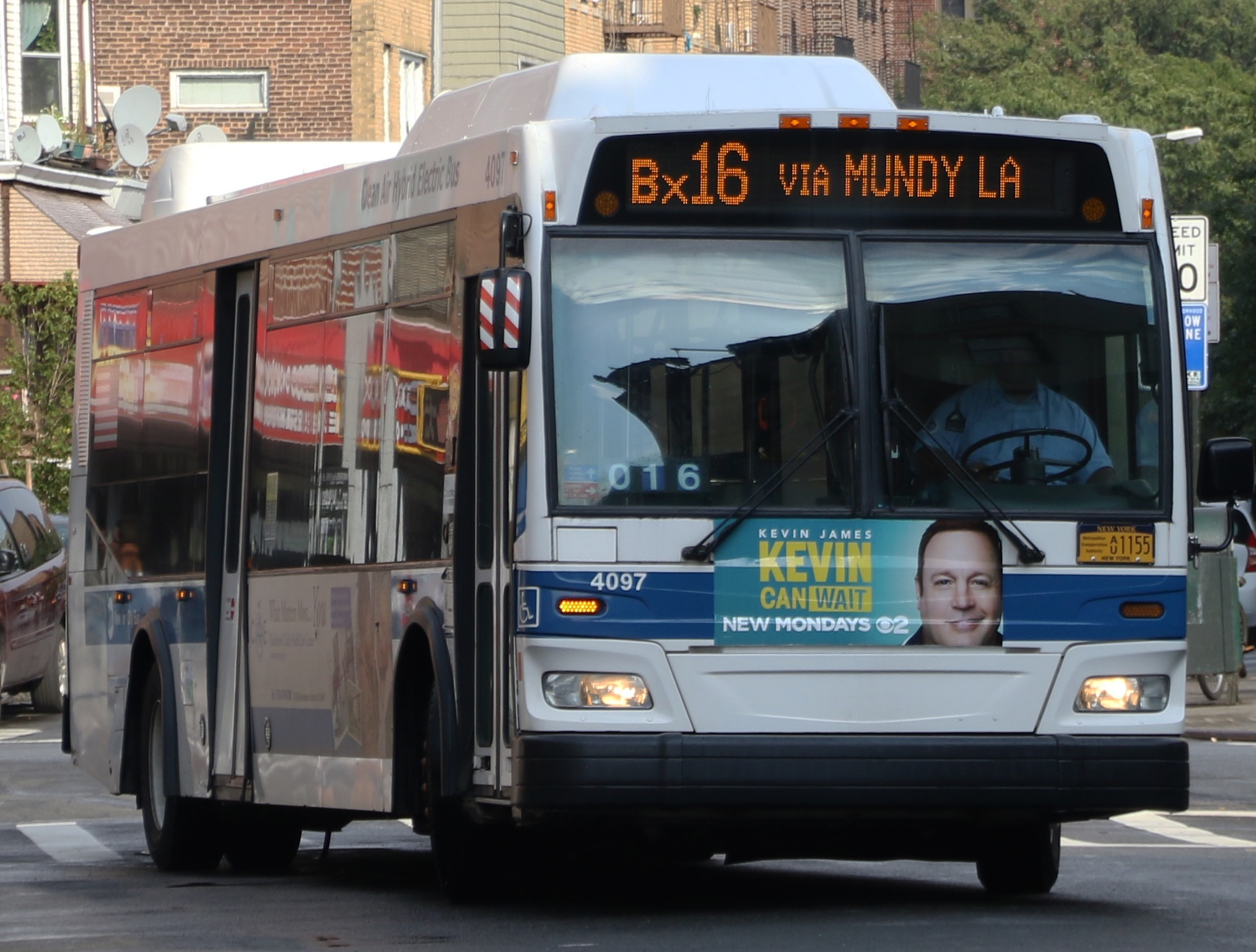
Bx16 bus turning onto 206th Street from Bainbridge Avenue

The following New York City Subway stations serve Norwood:

- Norwood–205th Street to Coney Island–Stillwell Avenue (D train)
- Woodlawn to Crown Heights–Utica Avenue (4 train)
- Mosholu Parkway to Crown Heights–Utica Avenue (4 train)

The Metro-North Railroad's Harlem Line to Grand Central serves Norwood at the Williams Bridge station located on the neighborhood's eastern border.

The following MTA Regional Bus Operations bus routes serve Norwood:

- Bx10: to Riverdale from 206th Street (via Riverdale Avenue)
- Bx16: to Eastchester from 206th Street (via Nereid Avenue-Mundy Lane)
- Bx28: to Co-op City or Fordham from Bainbridge Ave (via Gun Hill Road, Section 5 in Co-op City)
- Bx34: to Woodlawn or Fordham from Bainbridge Ave (via Bainbridge Avenue)
- Bx38: to Bay Plaza Shopping Center from Bainbridge Avenue or 206th Street (via Gun Hill Road, Sections 1-2-3 in Co-op City)
- Bx41 (including Select Bus Service): to Gun Hill Road or Third Avenue–149th Street stations from 204th Street (via Webster Av)

Norwood is also served by the following Bee-Line Bus System routes to Westchester County, New York:

- BL4: to Getty Square, Yonkers from Jerome Ave/Mosholu Parkway
- BL20: to White Plains via Cross County Shopping Center from Jerome Ave/Mosholu Parkway

== Adjoining areas ==
Nearby neighborhoods include Bedford Park, Williamsbridge, Olinville, Woodlawn Heights, and Allerton. Norwood is sometimes referred to as a section of Williamsbridge, but given how different Norwood's adjoining area to the east is, it is difficult to understand how this notion ever came into being. Possible sources of such a misconception could be the shared zip code between Norwood and Williamsbridge (10467) or due to the "Williamsbridge Oval" in Norwood.

== See also ==
- Irish Americans in New York City
- Woodlawn Heights, Bronx
- Woodlawn Cemetery, Bronx
- Norwood News
