= E. T. Bedford =

American businessman (1849–1931)

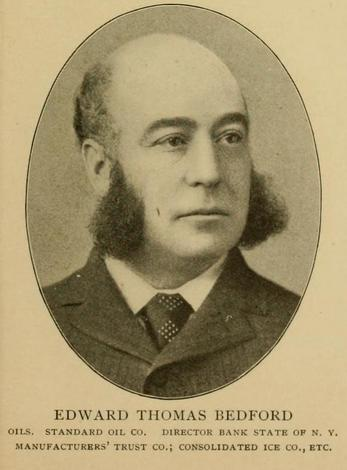
- Born: Edward Thomas Bedford; February 19, 1849; Brooklyn, New York, U.S.
- Died: May 21, 1931 (aged 82); Fairfield County, Connecticut, U.S.
- Occupation: Businessman
- Employer(s): Standard Oil, Corn Products Refining Co.
- Spouse: Mary Ann Dingle
- Parent(s): Frederick Thomas Bedford; Mary Anne Elizabeth Pace

Edward Thomas Bedford (February 19, 1849 – May 21, 1931) was an American executive of Standard Oil. In 1902, he founded the Corn Products Refining Company, now known as Ingredion. Bedford was an active member of the community in Westport, Connecticut, having donated buildings to the city for its middle school, firehouse, and a YMCA founded in 1923, for the youth to use. After resigning from his position at the Standard Oil Company of New Jersey in 1909, he worked full-time for the Corn Products Refining Co., up until his death on May 21, 1931.

== Early life ==
E.T. Bedford was born February 19, 1849, in Greens Farms, Connecticut, to Frederick Thomas Bedford and Mary Anne Elizabeth Pace, British immigrants who had arrived from London the previous year. Frederick was a deacon in the church and a noted wood carver; the hand carved frame for the portrait of The Prince of Wales, who was King Edward VII at the time, was his most famous piece.

Bedford went to school at Adams Academy in Greens Farms, as well as the public schools of Brooklyn, and Maple Grove Academy in Westport, Connecticut.

== Career ==
Bedford spent his time working on the farm with his father and neighbors. One of his proudest moments was buying a winter jacket from the money he earned as a 14-year-old farm hand. Frederick Thomas was a farmer and made a large amount of money selling onions, which had a large boom post-Civil War. Taking what he learned from farming with his father and the community, E.T. joined Charles Pratt and Company as a salesman.

Bedford helped the chemist Robert Chesebrough establish sales for his new product, Vaseline. By 1880, Bedford was the managing partner of the firm Thompson and Bedford Company, Limited, consisting of R.J. Thompson, himself, Charles Pratt, and Henry H. Rogers, most of whom became prominent leaders in petroleum through the Standard Oil Co. His firm was the eastern selling agents for Standard Oil, which owned the majority stake in his company's stock. Thompson retired and Bedford became the president of the company on May 15, 1911. The Standard Oil Company was dissolved under the Sherman Antitrust Act. His department at the Standard Oil Company became the Thompson and Bedford department again, but with Thompson retired, Bedford was the president and head of the company once more.

In 1903, Bedford was elected director of the Standard Oil Company of New Jersey. On January 1, 1909, he retired from active management of the company to pursue his interest in the Corn Products Refining Company (CPRC), which was an $80 million company of which he was president. After a public sale of $10 million in bonds, Bedford was able to make the CPRC grow and become highly profitable, with a profit of over $3 million per year.

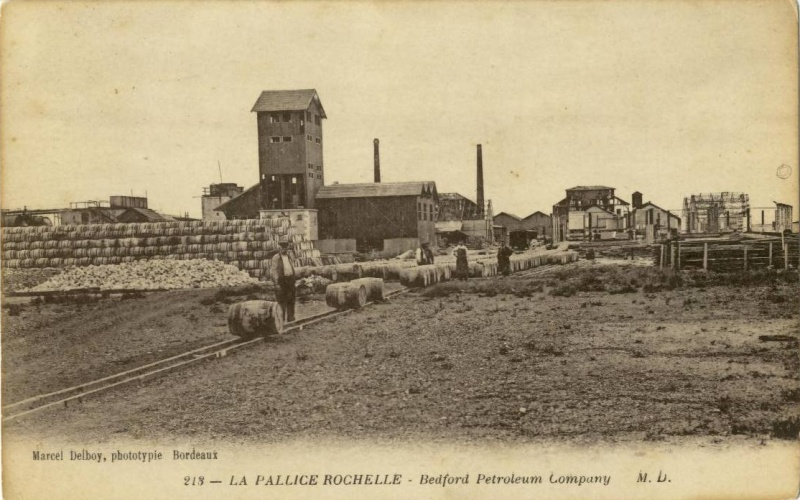
Bedford Petroleum Company in La Pallice near La Rochelle in France

Bedford had many businesses ventures. He was associated with the ice business in New York with the notorious Charles W. Morse. he was the President of Corn Oil Refining Products, the New York Glucose Company, the Bedford Petroleum Company of France, the Colonial Oil Company of New Jersey, and the Self Winding Clock Company; Vice President of the Matheson Lead Company; a Director of the Standard Oil Company of New Jersey, the Bush Terminal Company, the Thompson-Starrett Company; and a Trustee and Director of the Title Guarantee and Trust Company, the Southport Trust Company of Connecticut, and the Long Island Safe Deposit Company of Brooklyn.

=== Horse racing ===
Aside from several business ventures, Bedford was an expert breeder and horseman. He held a world record in the team to road wagon over a half-mile track of 2:12.25, and the race record to wagon of 2:08.25, which is the fastest mile driven in which more than two horses competed.

== Legacy ==
Bedford was actively involved in community projects and philanthropy. The first YMCA building in Westport, CT was donated by him in 1923 so the youth of the day would have a place to congregate in a safe and recreational fashion. A quote from his commencement speech on the opening of the YMCA building:

Sometimes on a Saturday afternoon and often of an evening I used to go to Westport and I have stood outside the windows of the old Westport hotel, where this building now stands, watching a game of pool or billiards. I was not allowed to enter on account of the saloon. The recollection of this and the experience taught me as to the need of some place for boys and young men to congregate lead to this building, which I hope may not only fill this want, but also be the headquarters for many good things that can be done for the benefit of our town.

As reported in the Westporter Herald- "In our office we have perhaps 400 young men and women. Occasionally we hear from their mothers, sometimes from their fathers, that they work too hard. In my experience, this has never been true. It is not the extra hour at the office that is impairing their health or lessening their strength, it is the hours they spend in enjoyment, dancing, late suppers, etc. It is my belief no one has ever shortened his life from work. Of course they might worry in connection with their work, but not from the work itself. Take Mr. Edison. We know the hours he works in his laboratory, disregarding time, in the interest he takes in his work, and see what a vigorous man he is and what he has accomplished."

Do not think, boys and young men, that you work too hard – the whole question is, do you work hard enough?

Bedford Park, Bronx was named after Bedford in 1906 by his contemporary Leonard Jerome, who had developed that part of the Bronx. Bedford Park, Illinois, was also named for Bedford, having been the owner of the company Corn Products International which brought in the work for the area.
