= The Lenru =

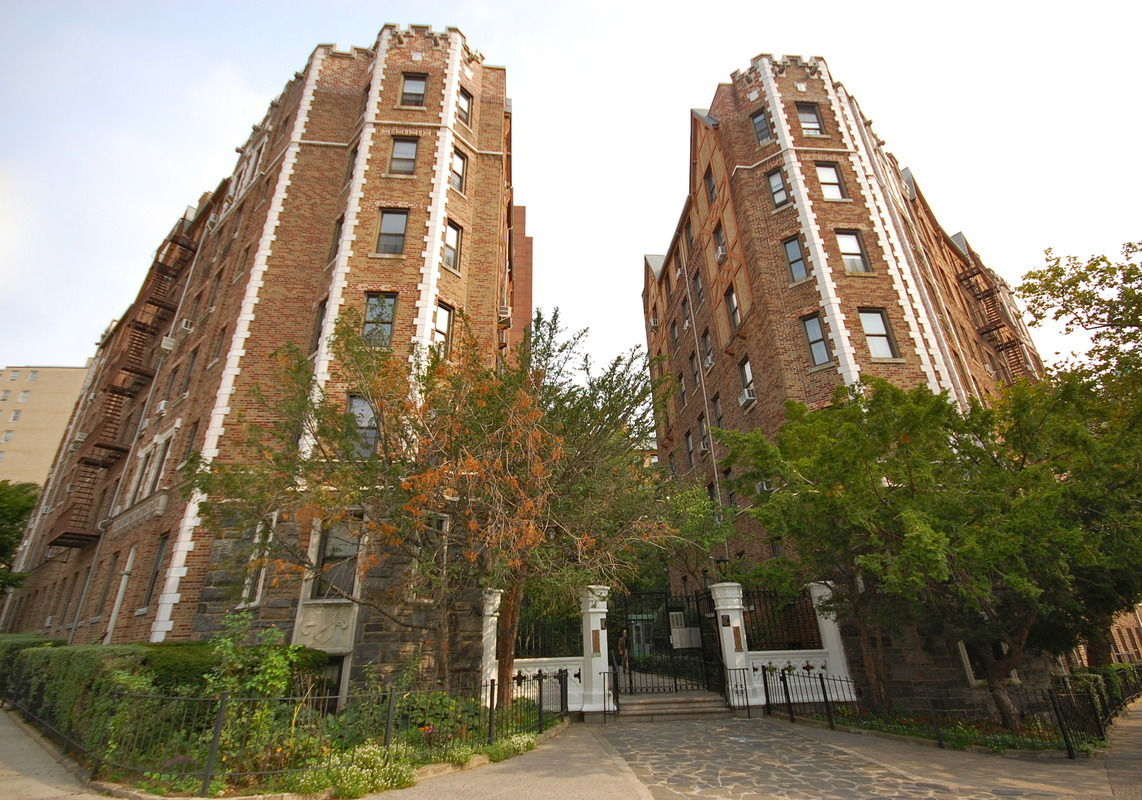
- A view of the front of The Lenru facing Williamsbridge Oval Park. Built in 1928, it is a pre-war building located at 3388-3400 Wayne Avenue.
- Interactive map of the The Lenru area

General information
- Type: Residential
- Architectural style: Jacobethan Revival
- Location: Norwood, The Bronx, New York City, 3388-3400 Wayne Avenue, The Bronx, New York, 10467
- Coordinates: 40°52′45″N 73°52′39″W
- Completed: 1928
- Owner: The Lenru Apartment Corporation

Technical details
- Floor count: 6
- Floor area: 148,000 sq ft (13,700 m^{2})

The Lenru is a co-operative apartment building in the Norwood neighborhood of the Bronx, New York City. The Lenru, (named after its original owner and his sister, Lenny and Ruth Kandell), was built in 1928 in the Jacobethan Revival style, which combined Tudor Revival and Gothic Revival or Elizabethan accents and was earmarked for restoration by the Mosholu Preservation Corporation in the late 1980s, becoming the corporation's first rehabilitation project. It sold to the Lenru Apartment Corporation to complete its conversion into a co-op in 1991.

The structure stands across from the Williamsbridge Oval Park, the former site of the old Williamsbridge Reservoir. It contains 104 units and has 6 stories.

== Image gallery ==
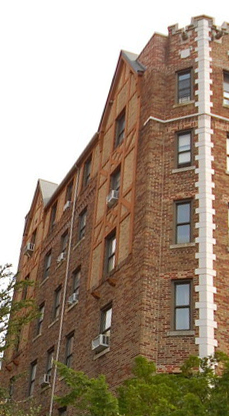
A Tudor Revival accent on The Lenru with steeply pitched roof and decorative half-timber.

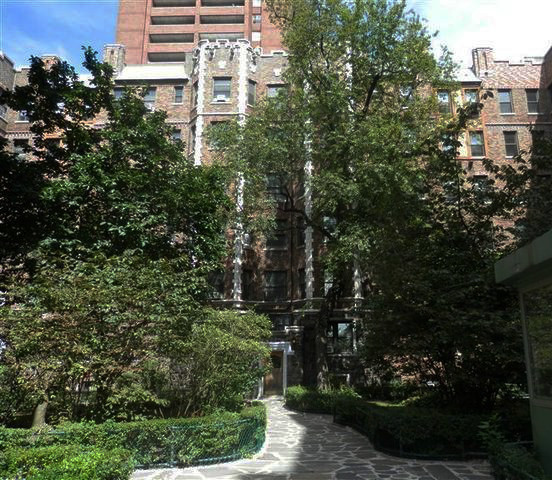
A crenelated parapet, redolent of Collegiate Gothic styling, is visible from this view in the courtyard of The Lenru.

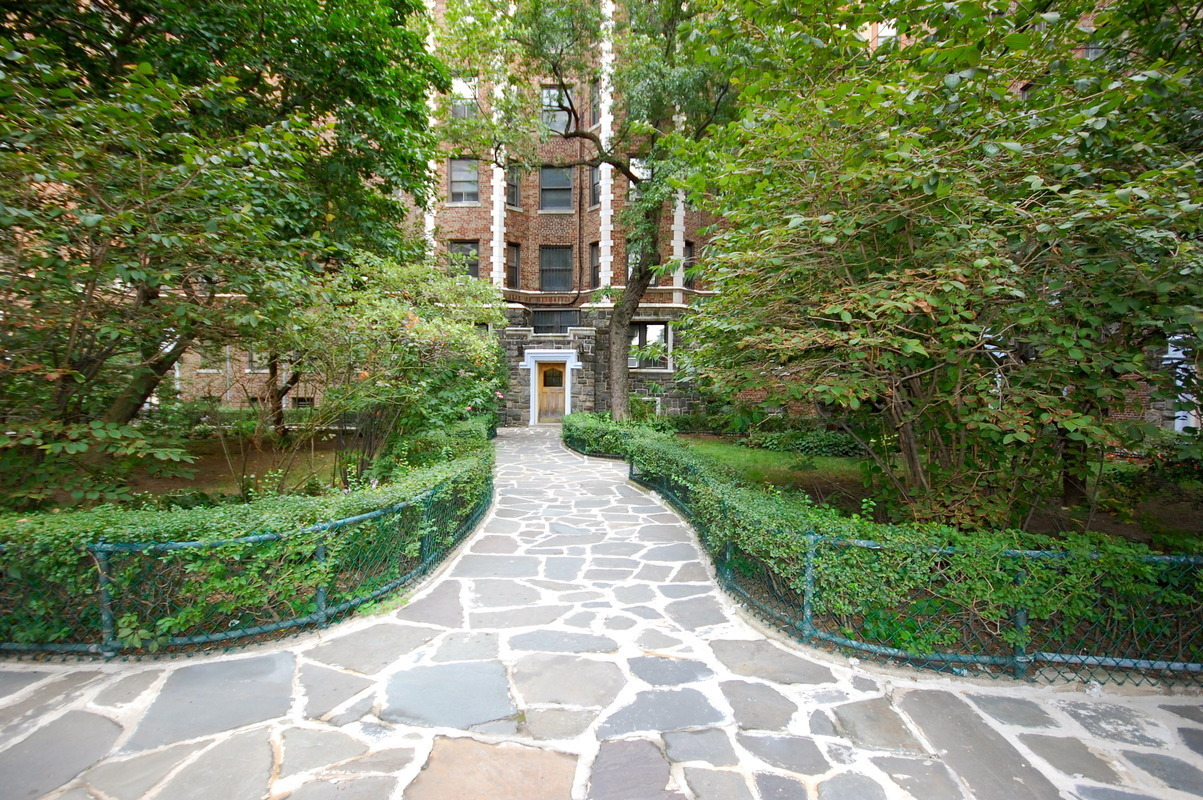
A courtyard view of The Lenru showing contrast of dark brick and masonry trim frame detailing.

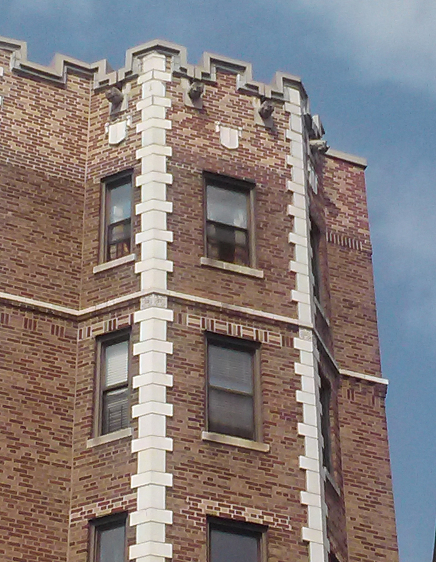
Four of the 38 stone gargoyles that overlook from the parapets around The Lenru.

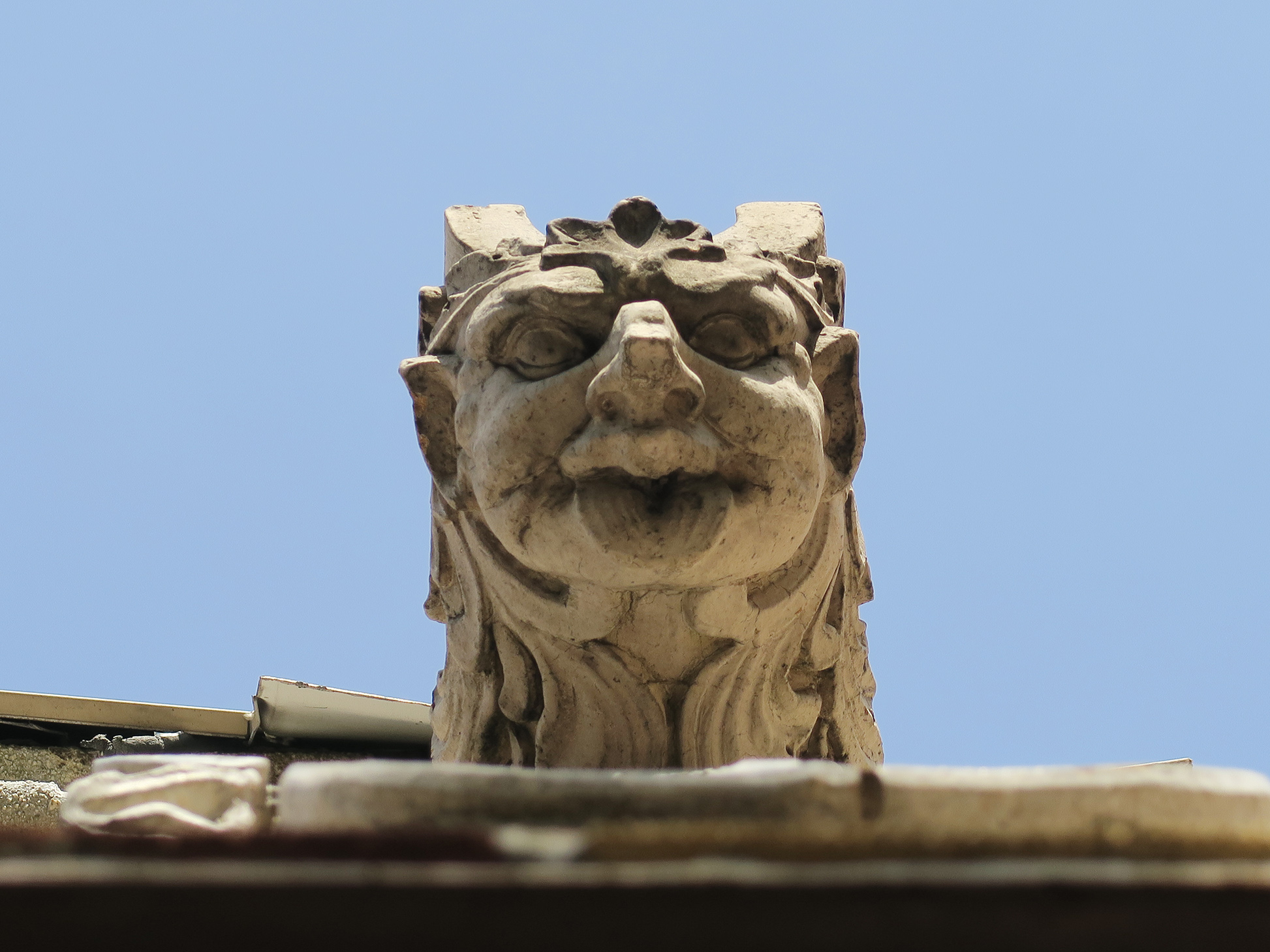
Closer look at one of the 38 stone gargoyles around The Lenru.

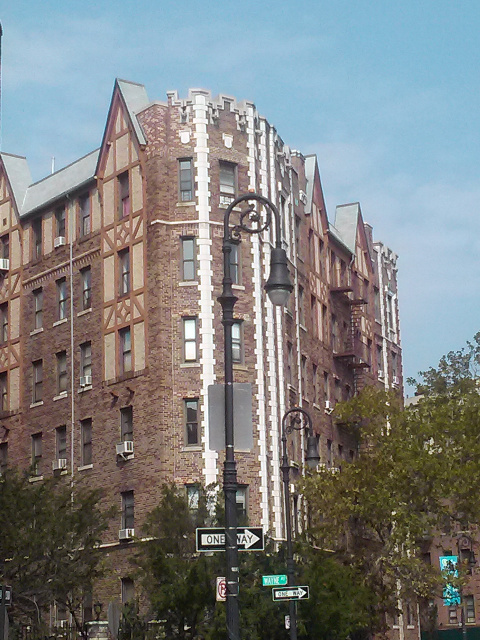
A corner view of The Lenru. The apartment was built in 1928 and reflects Jacobethan styled architecture with strong Tudor revival accents.

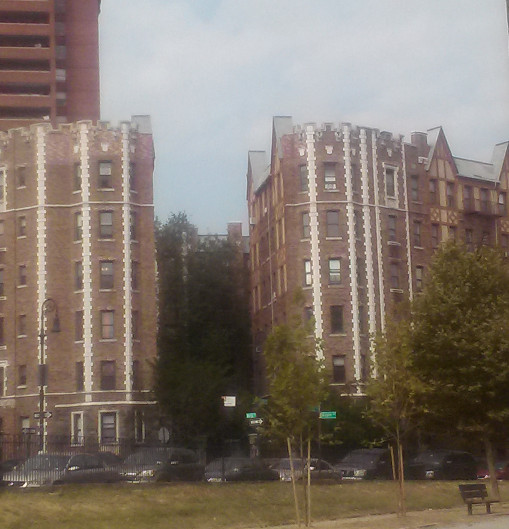
The Lenru apartment in the Norwood neighbourhood of the Bronx in New York City seen from the Williamsbridge Oval Park.

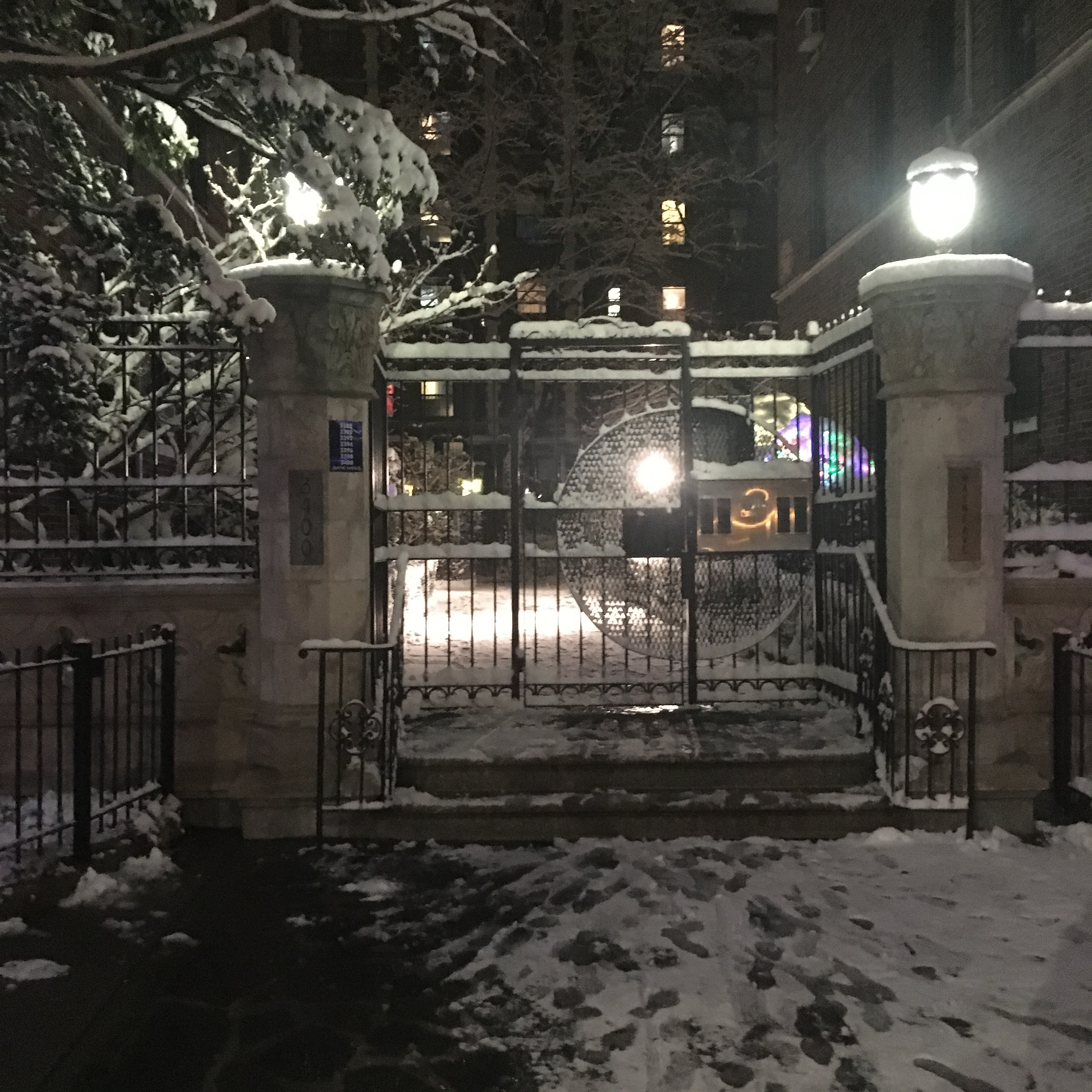
The season's magical first snow as seen outside the gates of The Lenru in the evening.
