= Bedford Park, Bronx =

Neighborhood in New York City

Bedford Park
- Neighborhood of the Bronx
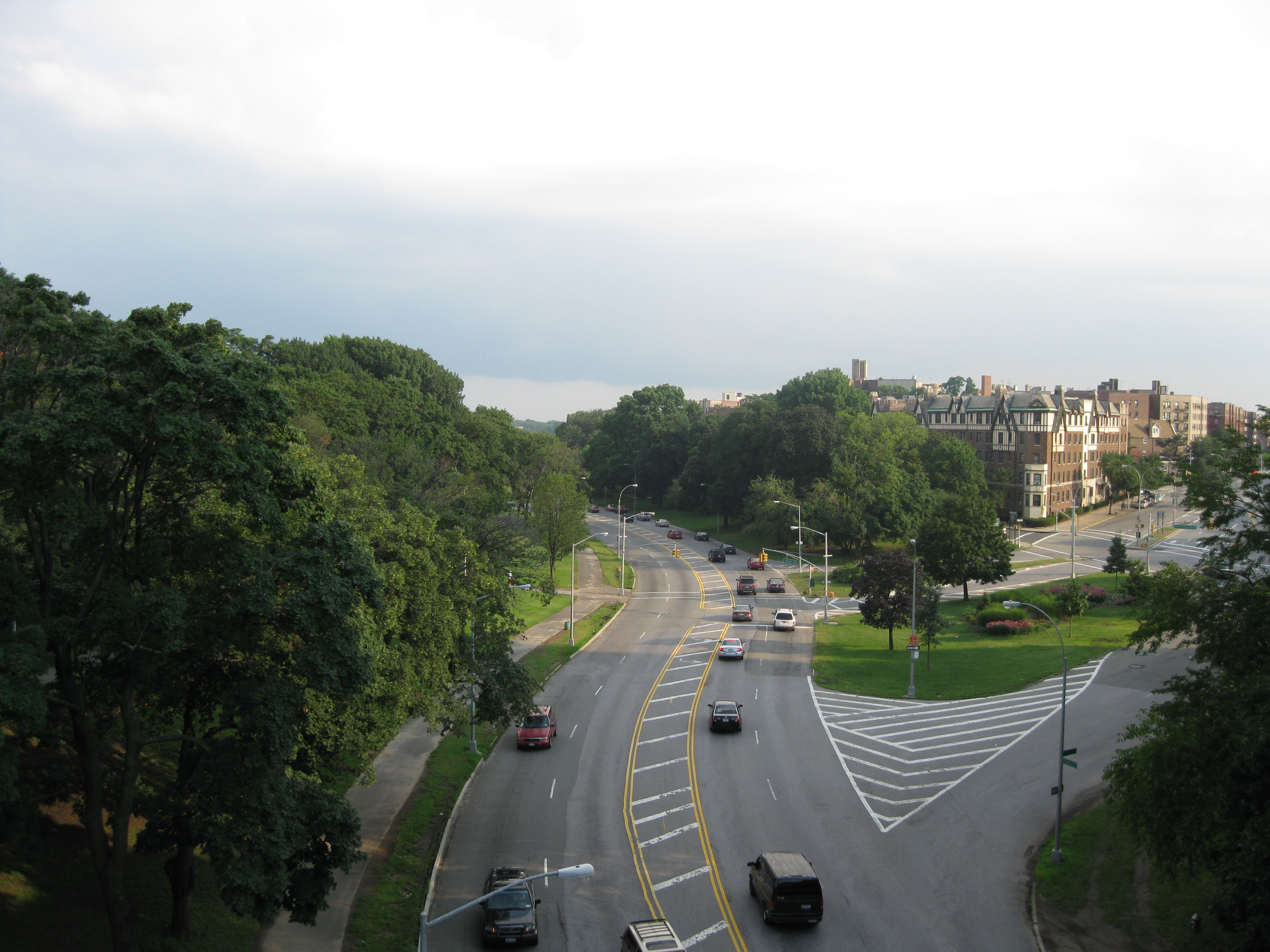
- View of the Mosholu Parkway in Bedford Park
- Interactive map of Bedford Park
- Coordinates: 40.870°N 73.886°W
- Country: United States
- State: New York
- City: New York City
- Borough: Bronx
- Community District: Bronx 7

Area
  - Total: 0.455 sq mi (1.18 km^{2})

Population (2011)
  - Total: 37,344
  - Density: 82,100/sq mi (31,700/km^{2})

Economics
  - Median income: $43,850
- ZIP Codes: 10458, 10468
- Area code: 718, 347, 929, and 917
- Website: bedfordpark.nyc

Bedford Park is a residential neighborhood in the northwest Bronx, New York City, adjacent to the New York Botanical Garden. Its boundaries, starting from the north and moving clockwise, are: Mosholu Parkway to the north, Webster Avenue to the east, East 196th Street to the south, and Jerome Avenue to the west.

The neighborhood is part of Bronx Community District 7, and its ZIP Codes include 10458 and 10468. The area is patrolled by the 52nd Precinct of the New York City Police Department.

== History ==
The area now known as Bedford Park was mostly farmland outside the town of Kingsbridge, then an unincorporated suburb of New York City. The area began to be developed with the construction of the Jerome Park Racetrack, for thoroughbred horse racing, by Leonard Jerome and August Belmont, Sr. in 1866. Jerome Park Racecourse became the first home of the famous Belmont Stakes horse race, until 1890. To attract the wealthy to the racecourse, Leonard Jerome built what is today Jerome Avenue. The town of Kingsbridge was officially incorporated into New York City in 1874.

In 1890, Jerome Park Racecourse was sold. Construction was started to convert it into the Jerome Park Reservoir, to store fresh water from the New Croton Aqueduct. At the same time, the neighborhood of Bedford Park was beginning to take shape. Forty "villas" (suburban houses) were built on a 23-acre (93,000 m^{2}) stretch, in a planned community, named Villa Avenue.

The area became a part of the newly created Borough of the Bronx in 1898. The Italian and Irish immigrants who worked on the Jerome Park Reservoir project soon anchored the community there. In 1906, 200th Street was renamed Bedford Park Boulevard, likely named after Edward Thomas Bedford, a director of Standard Oil, president of the Bank of the State of New York, who was an associate of Leonard Jerome.

Development continued with the completion of the Grand Concourse, a multilane thoroughfare, in 1914; and the extension of subway to the area with the IRT Jerome Avenue Line (present-day 4 train) in 1917. The Grand Concourse saw a boom in housing construction in the post-World War I era. Much of this was from middle-class people (primarily Jews, Italians, and Irish) moving from Manhattan.

During the 1970s and 1980s, when poverty, crime, arson, and drug use were prevalent across the Bronx, Bedford Park was able to somewhat withstand this compared to other neighborhoods in the more southern parts of the borough. This was largely due to community activists and organizers taking an aggressive stance on drugs and demanding increased law enforcement in the area.

== Demographics ==
Based on data from the 2010 United States census, the population of Bedford Park was 54,415, a change of -914 (-1.7%) from the 55,329 counted in 2000. Covering an area of 343.81 acres (139.13 ha), the neighborhood had a population density of 158.3 inhabitants per acre (101,300/sq mi; 39,100/km^{2}). The racial makeup of the neighborhood was 6.7% (3,637) White, 18% (9,805) African American, 0.3% (145) Native American, 5% (2,727) Asian, 0.1% (29) Pacific Islander, 0.9% (490) from other races, and 1.1% (623) from two or more races. Hispanic or Latino of any race were 67.9% (36,959) of the population.

The entirety of Community District 7, which includes Bedford Park, Jerome Park, Fordham, Kingsbridge Heights and Norwood, had 148,163 inhabitants as of NYC Health's 2018 Community Health Profile, with an average life expectancy of 79.4 years. This is lower than the median life expectancy of 81.2 for all New York City neighborhoods. Most inhabitants are youth and middle-aged adults: 26% are between the ages of 0 and 17, 31% between 25 and 44, and 23% between 45 and 64. The proportions of college-aged and elderly residents were lower, at 11% and 9% respectively.

As of 2017, the median household income in Community District 7 was $35,355. In 2018, an estimated 26% of Bedford Park and Norwood residents lived in poverty, compared to 25% in all of the Bronx and 20% in all of New York City. One in seven residents (14%) were unemployed, compared to 13% in the Bronx and 9% in New York City. Rent burden, or the percentage of residents who have difficulty paying their rent, is 61% in Bedford Park and Norwood, compared to the boroughwide and citywide rates of 58% and 51% respectively. Based on this calculation, as of 2018, Bedford Park and Norwood are considered low-income relative to the rest of the city and not gentrifying.

=== Culture ===
Bedford Park is home to people of many ethnicities including Korean, Indians, and Bangladeshis. Reflecting a population greatly composed of foreign-born immigrants, there are distinct ethnic enclaves in Bedford Park.

Bedford Park's ethnic diversity manifests itself in an assortment of ways besides the formation of enclaves. Among the national symbols one may see strolling the neighborhood include the double-headed eagle (the emblem of Albania), the icon of Our Lady of Guadalupe (sacred to Catholic Mexicans), the shamrock of Ireland, the Arabic calligraphy of the shahadah (the Muslim profession of faith), or the coquí of Puerto Rico. A vast assortment of newspapers are sold in local convenience stores, including The Irish Echo, Albanian-language Bota Sot of Kosovo, and the Spanish-language local newspapers El Diario/La Prensa, and El Hoy.

== Land use and terrain ==
Bedford Park is dominated by 5- or 6-story apartment buildings and three-story Victorian houses. The apartments on the Grand Concourse are often taller. Tracey Towers are two 41-story subsidized apartment buildings built close to the Jerome Park Reservoir. Designed by noted architect Paul Rudolph, they were completed in 1972 as a part of New York City's Mitchell Lama housing development initiative. The total land area is a little less than half a square mile.

== Politics ==
In the 2016 Presidential election, most precincts in Bedford Park voted for the Democratic Party candidate, Hillary Clinton, over her Republican Party opponent Donald Trump.

Bedford Park is in New York's 13th congressional district. Before redistricting in 2012, it used to be in New York's 16th district, which included the West Bronx and South Bronx; after redistricting, it includes parts of the northern Bronx and southern Westchester County. The district is represented by Adriano Espaillat as of 2018.

== Police and crime ==
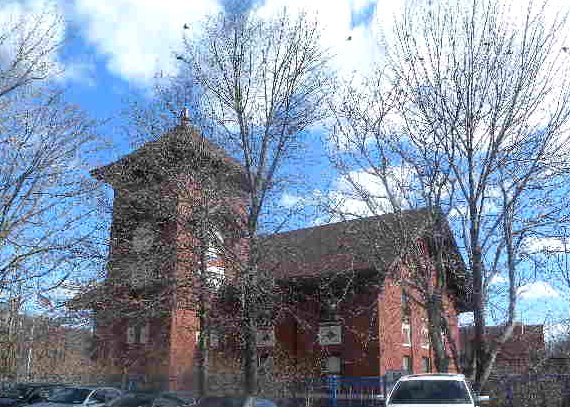
NYPD 52nd Precinct building at 3016 Webster Avenue

Bedford Park is patrolled by the 52nd Precinct of the NYPD, located at 3016 Webster Avenue. The 52nd Precinct ranked 49th safest out of 69 patrol areas for per-capita crime in 2010. As of 2018, with a non-fatal assault rate of 97 per 100,000 people, Bedford Park's rate of violent crimes per capita is greater than that of the city as a whole. The incarceration rate of 583 per 100,000 people is higher than that of the city as a whole.

The 52nd Precinct has a lower crime rate than in the 1990s, with crimes across all categories having decreased by 76.1% between 1990 and 2022. The precinct reported 14 murders, 37 rapes, 410 robberies, 598 felony assaults, 192 burglaries, 666 grand larcenies, and 254 grand larcenies auto in 2022.

== Fire safety ==
Bedford Park contains a New York City Fire Department (FDNY) fire station, Engine Co. 79/Ladder Co. 37/Battalion 27, at 2928 Briggs Avenue.

== Health ==
As of 2018, preterm births are less common in Bedford Park and Norwood than in other places citywide, though births to teenage mothers are more common. In Bedford Park and Norwood, there were 85 preterm births per 1,000 live births (compared to 87 per 1,000 citywide), and 30.3 births to teenage mothers per 1,000 live births (compared to 19.3 per 1,000 citywide). Bedford Park and Norwood has a relatively average population of residents who are uninsured. In 2018, this population of uninsured residents was estimated to be 16%, higher than the citywide rate of 12%.

The concentration of fine particulate matter, the deadliest type of air pollutant, in Bedford Park and Norwood is 0.0078 milligrams per cubic metre (7.8×10^{−9} oz/ft^{3}), more than the city average. Twelve percent of Bedford Park and Norwood residents are smokers, which is lower than the city average of 14% of residents being smokers. In Bedford Park and Norwood, 33% of residents are obese, 19% are diabetic, and 35% have high blood pressure—compared to the citywide averages of 24%, 11%, and 28% respectively. In addition, 25% of children are obese, compared to the citywide average of 20%.

Eighty-four percent of residents eat some fruits and vegetables every day, which is less than the city's average of 87%. In 2018, 67% of residents described their health as "good", "very good", or "excellent", lower than the city's average of 78%. For every supermarket in Bedford Park and Norwood, there are 18 bodegas.

The nearest hospitals are St Barnabas Hospital in Belmont, James J. Peters VA Medical Center in Kingsbridge Heights, North Central Bronx Hospital and Montefiore Medical Center in Norwood.

== Post offices and ZIP Codes ==
Bedford Park is divided into two ZIP Codes. The area west of Grand Concourse is located within 10468, while the area east of Grand Concourse is in 10458. The United States Postal Service operates two post offices near Bedford Park: the Botanical Station at 2963 Webster Avenue and the Van Cott Station at 3102 Decatur Avenue.

== Education ==
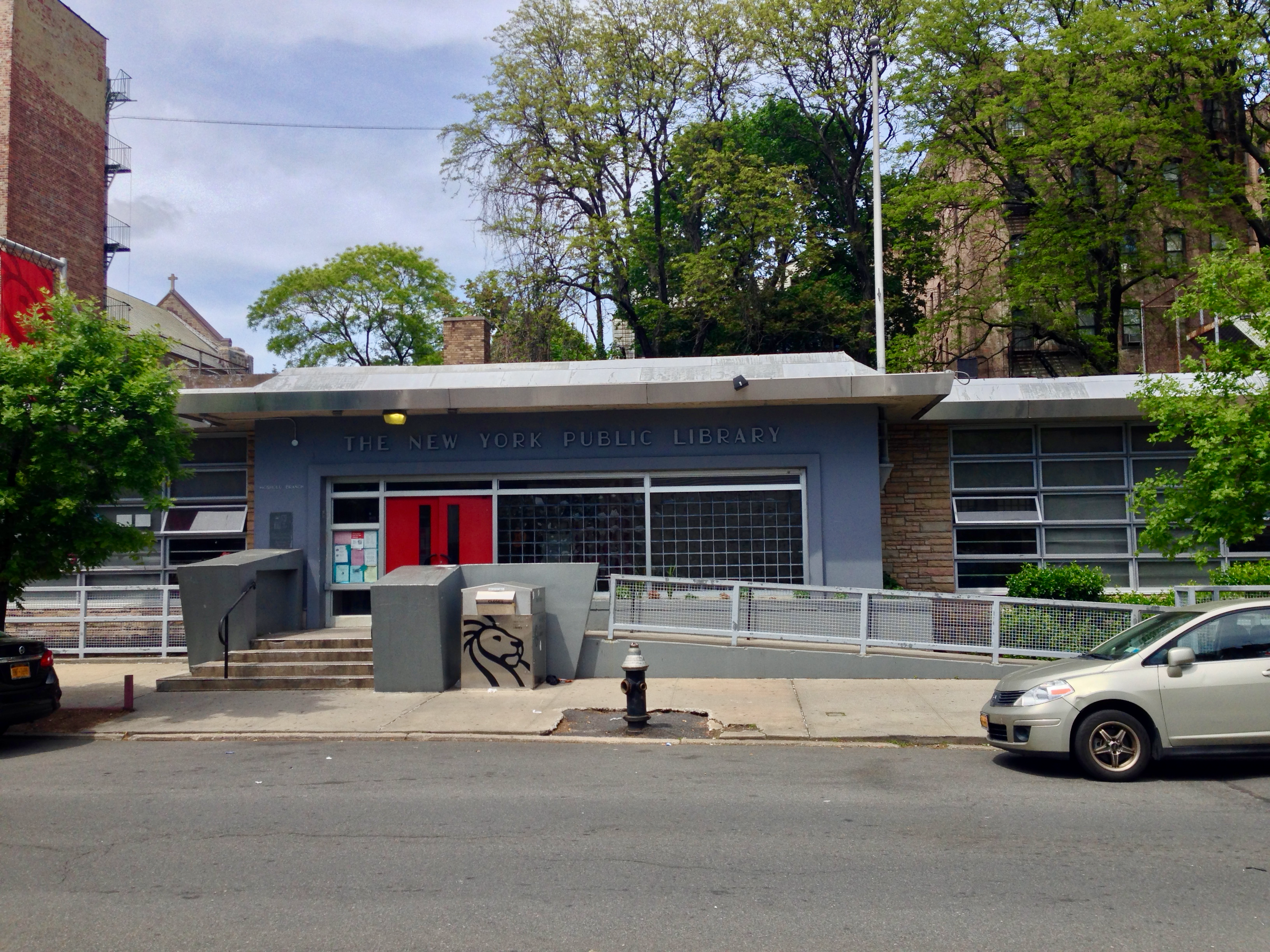
New York Public Library, Mosholu branch

Bedford Park and Norwood generally have a lower rate of college-educated residents than the rest of the city as of 2018. While 23% of residents age 25 and older have a college education or higher, 32% have less than a high school education and 45% are high school graduates or have some college education. By contrast, 26% of Bronx residents and 43% of city residents have a college education or higher. The percentage of Bedford Park and Norwood students excelling in math rose from 21% in 2000 to 48% in 2011, and reading achievement increased from 28% to 33% during the same time period.

Bedford Park and Norwood's rate of elementary school student absenteeism is more than the rest of New York City. In Bedford Park and Norwood, 28% of elementary school students missed twenty or more days per school year, higher than the citywide average of 20%. Additionally, 70% of high school students in Bedford Park and Norwood graduate on time, lower than the citywide average of 75%.

=== Schools ===
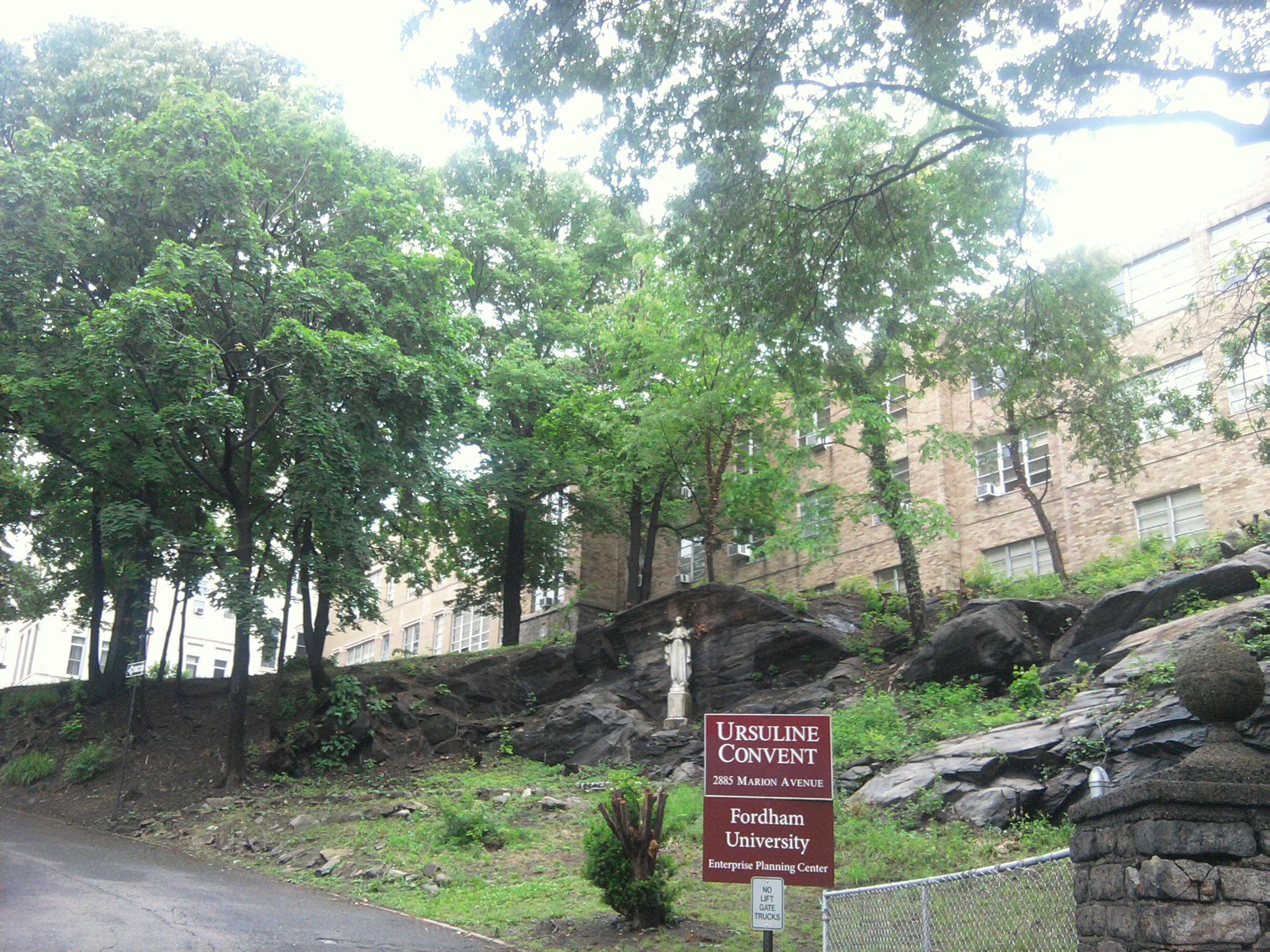
Ursuline Convent

In the 1930s, unclaimed land near the Jerome Park Reservoir offered opportunities for New Deal-related construction to alleviate unemployment from the Great Depression. Therefore, Bedford Park is home to a group of schools and a college located along the Jerome Park Reservoir, known as "Educational Mile". There are three high schools there (Walton, DeWitt Clinton, and Bronx Science), along with two elementary schools and Lehman College, formerly the Bronx Campus of Hunter College. After the end of World War II, in 1946 Hunter College's Bronx Campus served briefly as host of the United Nations. Currently, two of the nine specialized high schools in New York City are in the Bedford Park area, which includes Bronx High School of Science and the High School of American Studies at Lehman College. There was also a small private high school, Bedford Park Academy (founded in 1932, sold to Grace Lutheran Church in 1981), and a private Lutheran elementary school, Grace Lutheran School, which closed in 2006.

The Convent of Mount St. Ursula is located on Bedford Park Boulevard and Bainbridge Avenue. It was established by a group of Roman Catholic nuns from the Ursuline order in 1892. The Academy of Mount St. Ursula High School, an all-girls prep-school, is located there today; the order is also associated with the St Philip Neri Elementary School. It recently celebrated its 150th anniversary with the class of 2005. The academy is now the oldest, all female Catholic school in New York state.

One of the most notable places in the neighborhood is Lehman College, which was originally Hunter College's uptown campus. The Works Progress Administration built the original four buildings of the campus in grey stone in the Collegiate Gothic style, with finials, turrets, and other decorative features. Additional buildings, including the Lehman Library and Center for the Performing Arts, were added in the style of modern architecture. The newest building, the APEX, has facilities for athletics and dance. The scenic campus, which spans into Kingsbridge, has been used as a shooting location for episodes of the television series Law & Order and its spin-offs.

=== Library ===
The New York Public Library (NYPL) operates the Mosholu branch at 285 East 205th Street, next to Whalen Park. The branch opened in 1955 and contains two floors: a ground floor and a basement. The library hosts several programs, such as ESL for Non-English Speaking Adults and kids programs. The library contains a well stocked children area and brightly lit adult reading area.

== Religion ==
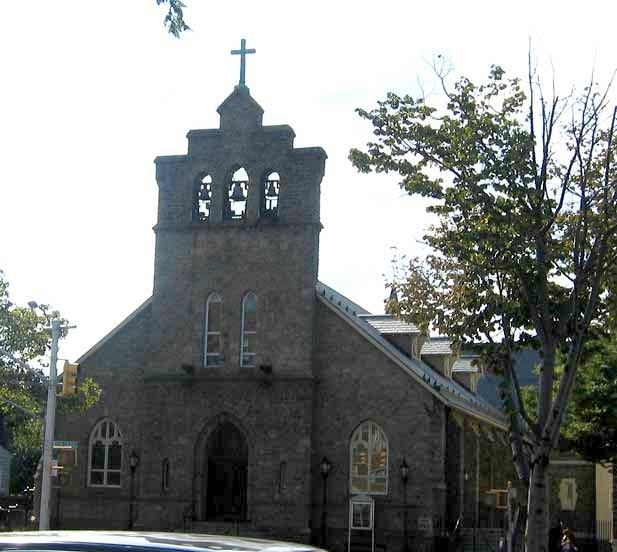
Church of St. Philip Neri

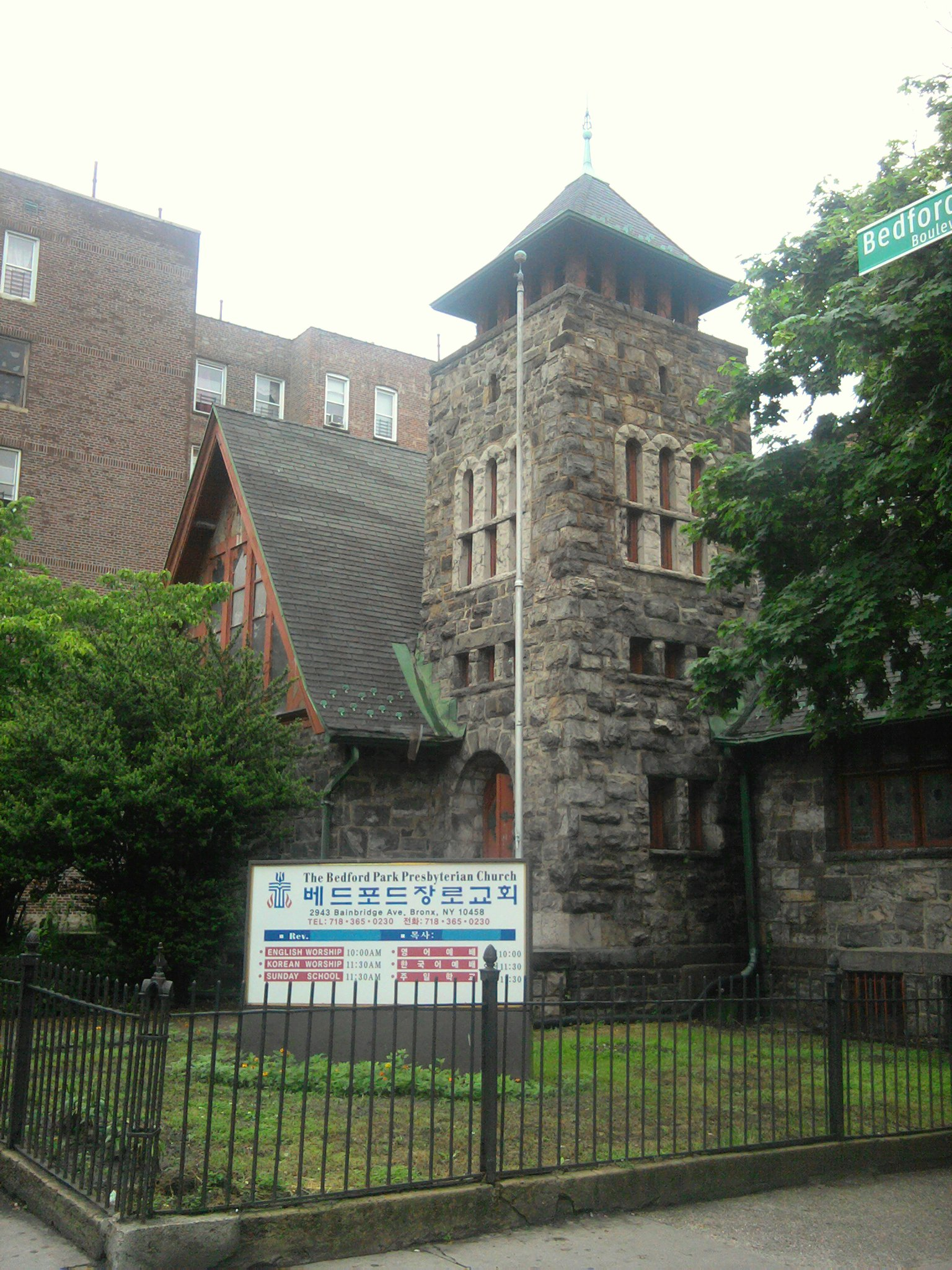
Bedford Park Presbyterian Church

Among Bedford Park's oldest buildings are its churches and other religious institutions. The oldest church in the area, Bedford Park Congregational Church at the corner of Bainbridge Avenue and East 201st Street, dates to 1882. Its American Queen Anne-style design hints at Bedford Park's origin as a small rural community. It was designated a City Landmark in 2000. (New York City Landmarks Commission 2005)

On the Grand Concourse lies the Roman Catholic Church of St. Philip Neri (Bronx, New York). The church was dedicated to the Italian saint due to its origin as a church for immigrant Italian laborers, who also worked on the construction of the Jerome Park Reservoir. The cornerstone of the church (dated 1899) was in fact quarried from what became Jerome Park Reservoir, and brought there by a horse-drawn carriage. (Greene 2002) When built and for many years thereafter, this parish served an Italian and Irish congregation. On June 13, 1997, the church suffered a massive fire, and was given major renovation into the mid-2000s.

== Transportation ==
=== Rail ===
The following New York City Subway stations serve Bedford Park:

- Bedford Park Boulevard–Lehman College (4 train)
- Mosholu Parkway station (4 train)
- Bedford Park Boulevard station (B and D trains)

The Metro-North Railroad's Harlem Line also serves Bedford Park via the Botanical Garden station.

=== Roads ===
The most notable roads in the area include Jerome Avenue, Grand Concourse, Bedford Park Boulevard, Sedgwick Avenue, and Mosholu Parkway.

- Mosholu Parkway is a part limited access, part surface highway that is the main east–west arterial through the neighborhood, and acts as the northern border of Bedford Park. The limited access section ends at an intersection with Gun Hill Road and Goulden Avenue on the border between Bedford Park and Van Cortlandt Park.
- Jerome Avenue is one of two main north–south arterials through Bedford Park. The Jerome Avenue elevated (4 train) runs above Jerome Avenue.
- Grand Concourse is the other main north–south arterial through Bedford Park, and is the widest street in the neighborhood. The Concourse subway (B and D trains) runs below Grand Concourse.
- Sedgwick Avenue is an east–west divided avenue that connects the Mosholu Parkway with the Major Deegan Expressway (I-87).
- Bedford Park Boulevard, the road most commonly associated with the neighborhood thanks to its name, is the main business district in Bedford Park. While not a major road, it is still an east–west arterial that serves as a slower alternate to the Mosholu Parkway. It is also served by two of the three subway stations in the neighborhood.

Other smaller but still noteworthy streets in Bedford Park include Goulden Avenue, which runs north–south along the Jerome Reservoir; Gun Hill Road, a major street that clips the corner of the neighborhood; Webster Avenue, which is just over the border in Bronx Park; and 198th Street, which is just across the border in Kingsbridge.

=== Buses ===
The following MTA Regional Bus Operations bus routes serve Bedford Park:

- Bx1: to Riverdale and Third Avenue–138th Street station (6 and <6> trains) (via Grand Concourse)
- Bx2: to Kingsbridge Heights and Third Avenue–138th Street station (6 and <6> trains) (via Grand Concourse)
- Bx10: to Riverdale and Norwood–205th Street station (D train) (via Riverdale Avenue)
- Bx22: to Castle Hill (via Castle Hill Avenue). Bus terminates in Bedford Park.
- Bx25, Bx26: to Co-op City (via Allerton Avenue). Bus terminates in Bedford Park.
- Bx28, Bx38: to Co-op City and Fordham (via Gun Hill Road)
- Bx34: to Woodlawn and Fordham (via Bainbridge Avenue)
- Bx41, Bx41 SBS: to Gun Hill Road station (2 and 5 trains) and Third Avenue–149th Street station (2 and 5 trains) (via Webster Avenue)

Bedford Park is also served by the following Bee-Line Bus System routes to Westchester County, New York:

- BL20 and BL21: to White Plains (via Jerome Avenue and Central Avenue)
- BL4: to Yonkers (via McLean Avenue)

== See also ==
- Norwood News, a local newspaper.
