= Bronx Community Board 7 =

Bronx Community District 7
- Community District
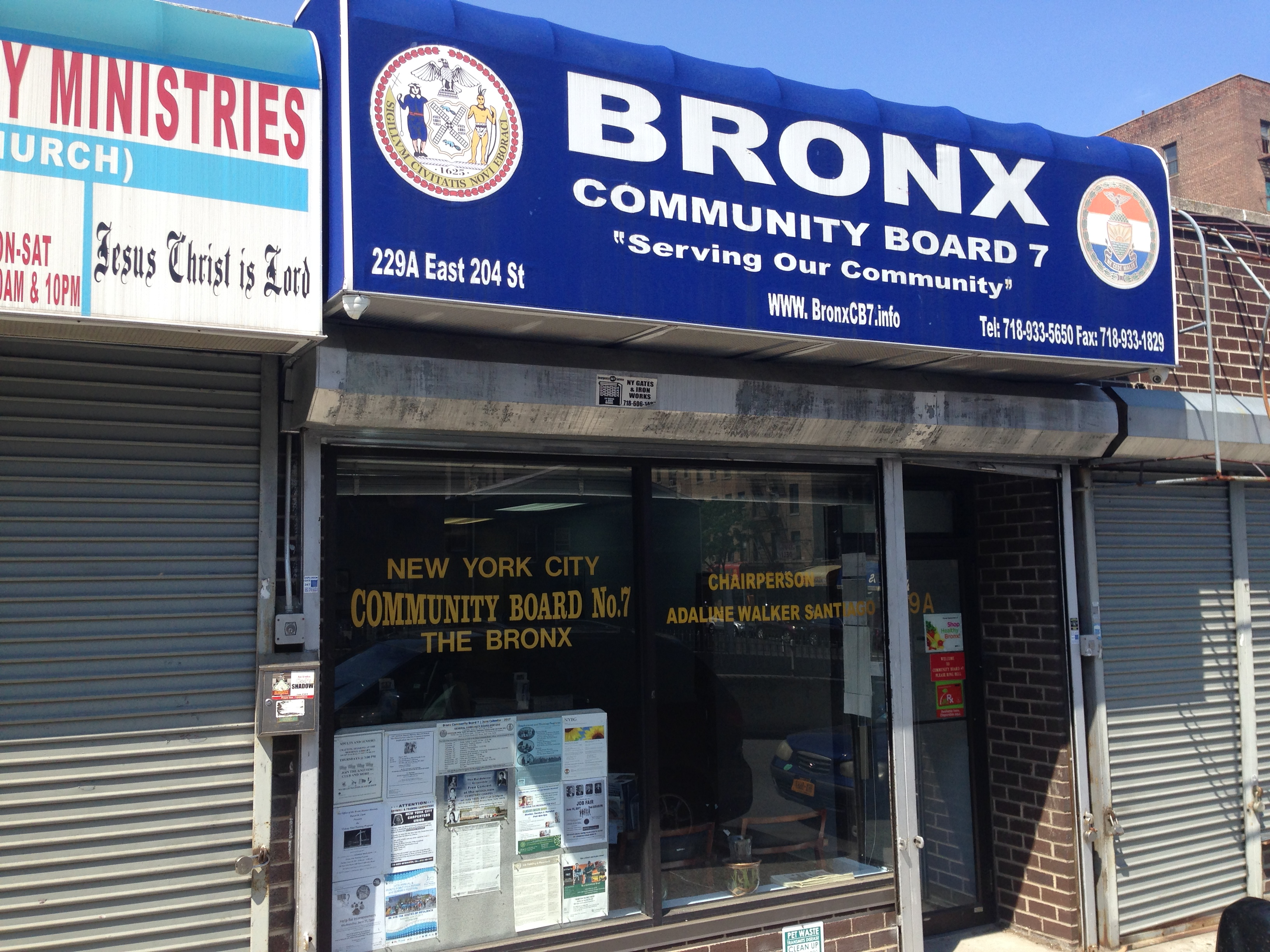
- Bronx Community Board 7 office.
- Country: United States
- State: New York
- City: New York City
- Borough: The Bronx
- Neighborhoods: list: Bedford Park; Fordham North; Jerome Park; Parts of Kingsbridge Heights; Norwood; Parts of University Heights

Government
  - Chair: Leurys Acosta
  - District Manager: Karla Cabrera Carrera

Area
  - Total: 1.9 sq mi (4.9 km^{2})

Population (2000)
  - Total: 141,411
  - Density: 74,000/sq mi (29,000/km^{2})

Ethnicity
  - Hispanic: 59.2%
  - African-American: 20%
  - White: 10.7%
  - Asian: 6.4%
  - American Indian or Alaska Native: 0.3%
  - Others: 0.8%
- ZIP codes: 10453, 10458, 10463, 10467, 10468
- Area codes: 718, 347, 646, 917
- Police Precinct: 52nd (website)
- Commanding Officer: Deputy Inspector Chase A. Maneri
- Website: www.nyc.gov/bronxcb7

Bronx Community Board 7 the governing body of Bronx Community District 7, a local government unit of the city of New York.

The Community District encompasses the neighborhoods of Bedford Park, Fordham, Jerome Park, Kingsbridge Heights, Norwood, and University Heights. It is delimited by the New York-New Haven Railroad, Webster Avenue, East Fordham Road, Jerome Avenue, and West 183rd Street to the east, Jerome Avenue, West Gun Hill Road, Goulden Avenue, Kingsbridge Road, West 225th Street, and the Harlem River to the west, West Gun Hill Road, Jerome Avenue, Bainbridge Avenue, and East 211th Street to the north and Hall of Fame Terrace to the south.

== Board responsibilities ==
The Chairperson of each Community Board is a member of a board known as the Borough Board. Each New York City Borough has its own Board, composed of the Board's Borough President, all of the New York City Council members from that Borough, and all of the Community Board Chairpersons. These Borough Boards are responsible for:

- Community Board and city agency matters relating to the welfare of the borough and its residents; holding or conducting public hearings at its discretion;
- Assisting agencies that deliver services within the borough to prepare and review service statements; preparing and planning for the physical growth, improvement and development of the borough;
- Reviewing and making recommendations with respect to applications and proposals of public agencies and private entities for the use, development or improvement of land located in more than one district; mediating disputes and conflicts arising among two or more Community Boards in the borough;
- Submitting a comprehensive statement of the expense and capital budget priorities and needs of the borough; keeping a public record of its activities and transactions, including minutes of the meetings, and to make these records available to elected officials upon request and for reasonable public inspection.

Bronx CB7 Chairs	Term Duration	
Yajaira Arias	2022	2023
Barbara Stronczer	2021	2022
Emmanuel Martinez	2019	2021
Jean Hill	2018	2019
Adaline Walker Santiago	2010	2017
Gregory W. Faulkner	2007	2010
Paul Foster	2002	2007
Nora Feury	1990	2002

== Demographics ==
As of the United States 2000 Census, the Community District has a population of 141,411, up from 128,588 in 1990 and 116,825 in 1980. Of them, 83,750 (59.2%) are of Hispanic origin, 28,277 (20%) are Black, non-Hispanic, 15,164 (10.7%) are White, non-Hispanic, 9,114 (6.4%) are Asian or Pacific Islander, 383 (0.3%) American Indian or Alaska Native, 1,080 (0.8%) are some other race (non-Hispanic), and 3,643 (2.6%) of two or more races (non-Hispanic).
