= Fordham, Bronx =

Neighborhood in New York City

Fordham
- Neighborhood of the Bronx
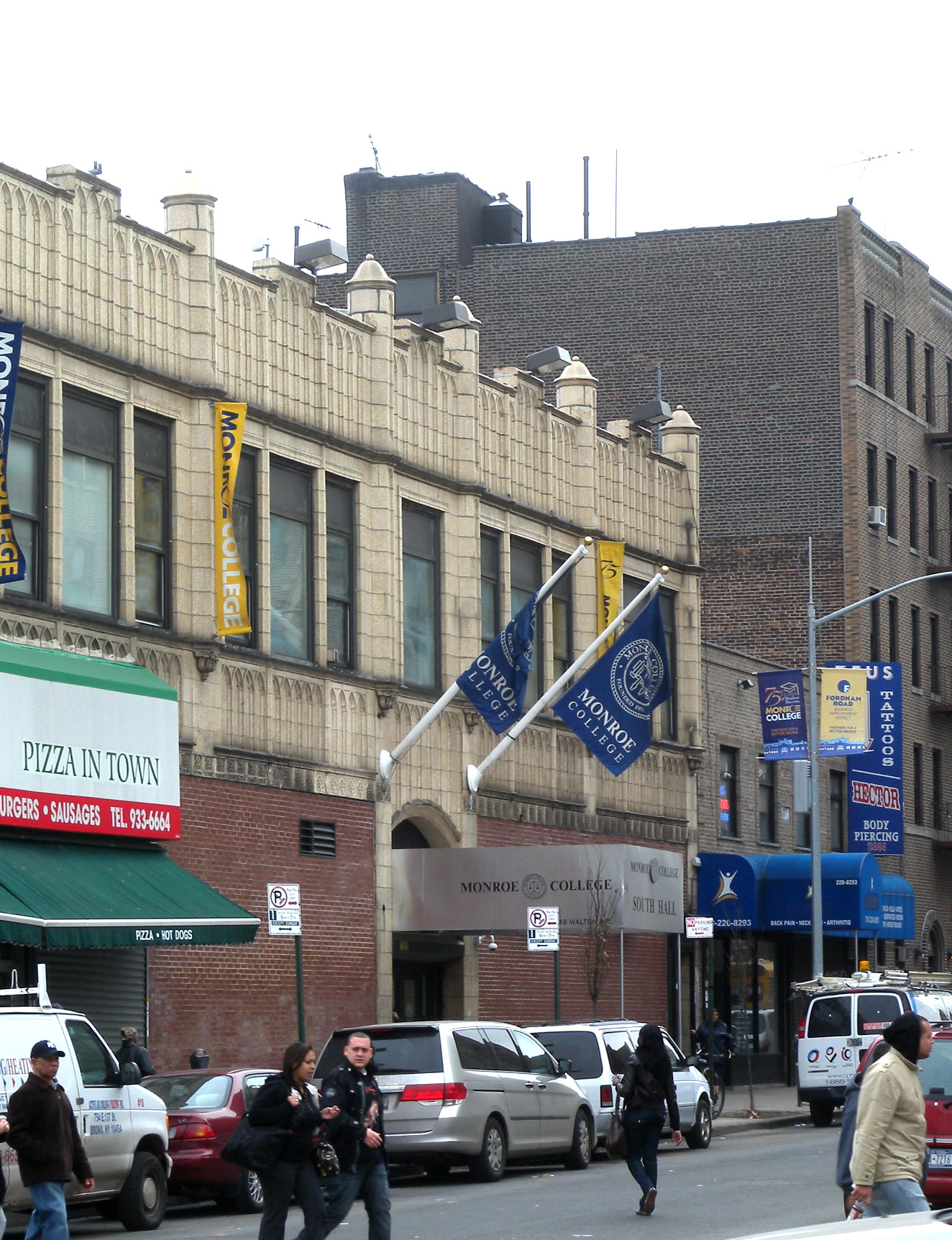
- Looking south across Fordham Road and along Walton Avenue at Monroe College
- Interactive map of Fordham
- Coordinates: 40.859°N 73.898°W
- Country: United States
- State: New York
- City: New York City
- Borough: The Bronx
- Community District: The Bronx 5 and The Bronx 7

Area
  - Total: 0.507 sq mi (1.31 km^{2})

Population (2011)
  - Total: 43,394
  - Density: 85,600/sq mi (33,000/km^{2})

Economics
  - Median income: $26,143
- ZIP Codes: 10453, 10457, 10458, 10468
- Area codes: 718, 347, 929, and 917
- Website: fordham.nyc

Fordham is a neighborhood located in the western Bronx, New York City. Fordham is roughly bordered by East 196th Street to the north, the Harlem River to the west, Fordham Road to the south, and Southern Boulevard to the east. The neighborhood's primary thoroughfares are Fordham Road and the Grand Concourse.

Fordham is located within Bronx Community Board 5 and Bronx Community Board 7, and its ZIP Codes include 10453, 10457, 10458, and 10468. Its main subway line is the IND Concourse Line (B and D trains), operating under the Grand Concourse, with the IRT Jerome Avenue Line (4 train) on its western border. The area is patrolled by the New York City Police Department's 46th Precinct. New York City Housing Authority (NYCHA) property in the area is patrolled by P.S.A. 7 at 737 Melrose Avenue in the Melrose section of the Bronx. The neighborhood is home to the original, Rose Hill campus of Fordham University.

== History ==
Jan Arcer, a Dutch settler (who anglicized his name to John Archer), established a community at what is now 225th Street near the Harlem River in 1666. Archer owned 3900 acres of land which Francis Lovelace, the colonial governor of New York, approved for settlement. The area known as "Fordham Manor" was 6 square miles. This was called a Patent, making Archer "Lord of the Manor". Sixteen families established farms in the area. The Manor lasted from 1671 to 1762.

Archer chose the name Fordham for his community, which may have been a reference to its location near a shallow crossing ("ford") of the Bronx River, or may have been a reference to John Fordham, a fifteenth-century English priest.

=== Old Fordham Village ===
Old Fordham Village is a section of Fordham that dates back to the English colonial era. It is centered on the intersection of the Grand Concourse and Fordham Road. Fordham Village extends north to about 196th Street, south to about 187th Street, east to Southern Boulevard, and west to Jerome Avenue.

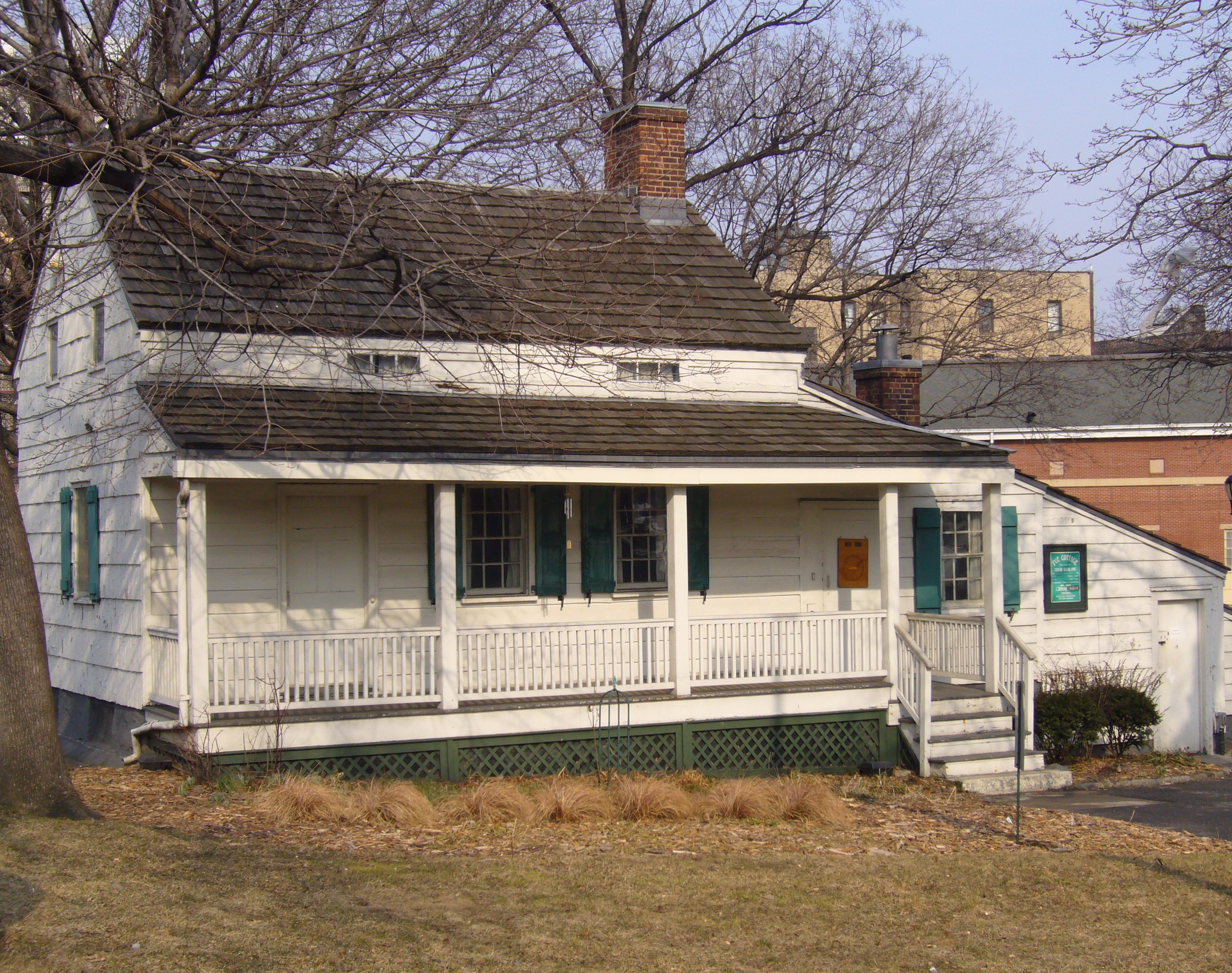
Edgar Allan Poe cottage

The section's origins date back to about 1751, when Fordham Manor was built on what was called Rose Hilll. Most of the estate is part of the Rose Hill Campus of Fordham University. Besides the main manor house and other side buildings on the campus, other historic buildings and noted homes still exist within Old Fordham Village. For example, writer and poet Edgar Allan Poe spent his final years with his wife Virginia in a cottage in Fordham, which is still standing in Poe Park. The nearby Fordham University Church bell is named "old Edgar" and may have been the inspiration for his poem "The Bells".

In the 18th century, the Kings Road went through Old Fordham Village, an area of rural estates and small farms, linking Colonial New York and towns and villages north toward Boston. It was a minor rest stop for travelers and coaches, where many springs fed the Mill Brook that crossed this road. During the American Revolution, it was a critical crossing point for General George Washington's Continental Army retreating toward White Plains to safely escape from New York while being chased by the Colonial British and Hessian forces. There were many American Patriots who lived in this area. After the revolution, the Kings Road was renamed the Boston Post Road, becoming an important thoroughfare for a growing new nation.

In the 19th century, with the building of the White Plains Line (later the Harlem Line of the New York Central Railroad) and a small station, Old Fordham Village began to grow. Local farmers and dairymen were able to use the railroad to send their products to a growing New York City. Part of the Mill Brook was dammed up north of the village, and a large pond and ice house were built for shipping and cold storage. It provided fresh ice for the community and the railroad. In 1838, a wealthy New York City Irish Catholic real estate magnate named Andrew Carrigan (1804–1872) bought the 100-acre Rose Hill estate, located east of the village, for the sole purpose of selling it to his close friend John Joseph Hughes (1797–1864), who at the time was coadjutor bishop of the Diocese of New York. Hughes purchased the estate from Carrigan in 1839 for $29,750, and founded St. Joseph's Seminary (1840) and St. Joseph's College (1841) (later Fordham University) on the property. In 1846 Hughes deeded St. Joseph's College over to the Roman Catholic Jesuit Order (Society of Jesus) for $40,000, but retained title to the seminary property (about 9 acres of land). The seminary was closed in 1859. Today, a small south-west portion of the former Rose Hill estate is known as Rose Hill Park.

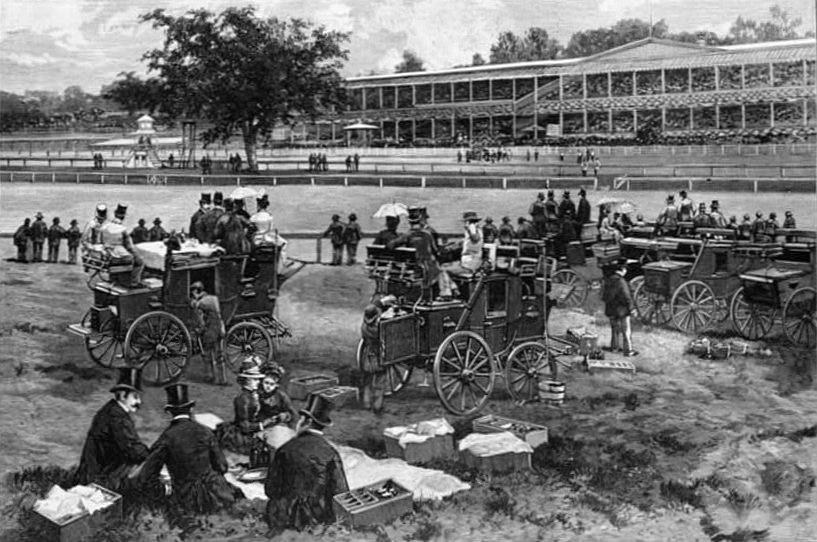
The Jerome Park Racetrack, 1886

West of the village, on the other side of Fordham Hill, the Bathgate Estate was built; it was later acquired by wealthy financier and stock speculator Leonard Jerome, Winston Churchill's maternal grandfather . He built the Jerome Park Racetrack, where the first Belmont Stakes was held, on his estate. West of the station in the village area, the Fordham Hotel and Taverine would provide basic needs for visitors to the college and the racetrack.

=== After 1900 ===
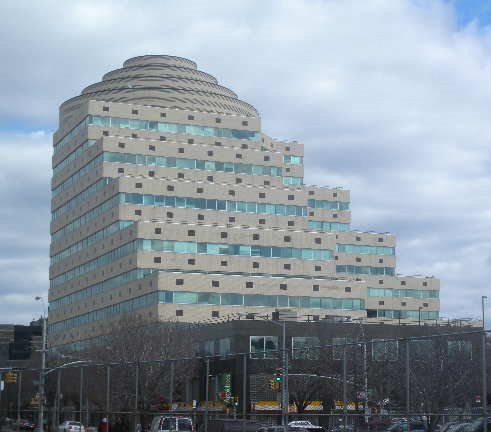
One Fordham Plaza

For the most part, Old Fordham Village remained rural until about 1900, when New York City began to expand. Early mass transit to the suburbs changed the area of what is Fordham today. Old Fordham Village and the surrounding area would become part of the borough of the Bronx within New York City. Many remaining farms and estates were sold to developers who built houses and sizable apartment buildings. The formerly quiet little village became a major business and transportation hub. In this area of Fordham, Boston Post Road was renamed Fordham Road and became part of U.S. Route 1 in 1926. The rebuilding of the railroad right of way at Fordham, and most of Webster Avenue, eliminated the Mill Brook and water pond, but the side streets of Old Fordham Village remain active.

Fordham was a predominantly middle class White (of Irish and Jewish origins) neighborhood from the 1920s through the late 1970s, when many families moved to the suburbs or to the Los Angeles area, or retired to Florida. Belmont was formerly a portion of Fordham and South Fordham.

On January 9, 2022, a high-rise fire tore through an apartment building in Fordham. At least 19 people were killed, including nine children, and at least 60 other people were injured, including 32 with life-threatening injuries. It was the third-deadliest residential fire in the U.S. since 1978.

== Demographics ==
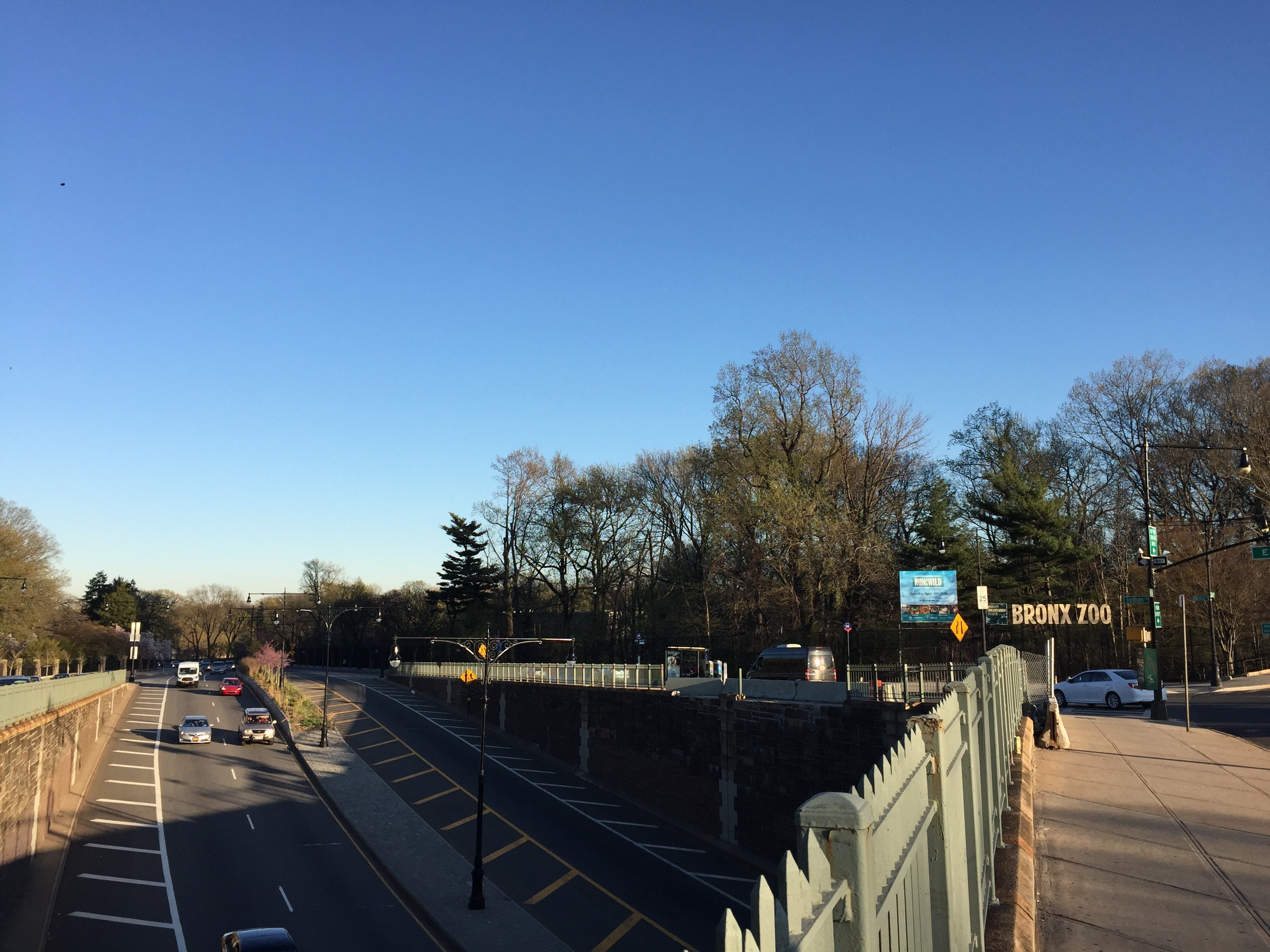
Fordham near New York Botanical Garden and the Bronx Zoo

Fordham has a population of around 43,394 people. Its first growth was in the 1920s, when middle-class and working-class families from Manhattan flocked into the area, attracted by the then-modern housing and convenient subway access by the Concourse, Jerome Avenue, and Third/Webster Avenues lines to business districts in Manhattan where they could work and shop. It is now predominantly Latino American and African American. There is a significant historic Italian and Albanian population as well.

Fordham is divided into two sections: Community District 5, south of Fordham Road, comprising Fordham South, and Community District 7, north of Fordham Road, comprising Fordham North. Most inhabitants of Community District 5 are youth and middle-aged adults: 28% are between 0–17, 29% between 25 and 44, and 23% between 45 and 64. The ratio of college-aged and elderly residents was lower, at 12% and 8% respectively. Similarly, most inhabitants of Community District 7 are youth and middle-aged adults: 26% are between the ages of between 0–17, 31% between 25 and 44, and 23% between 45 and 64. The ratio of college-aged and elderly residents was lower, at 11% and 9% respectively.

As of 2017, the median household income in Community District 5 was $30,166, and the median household income in Community District 7 was $35,355. In 2018, an estimated 34% of Fordham South residents lived in poverty, compared to 25% in all of the Bronx and 20% in all of New York City. One in eight residents (13%) were unemployed, compared to 13% in the Bronx and 9% in New York City. Rent burden, or the percentage of residents who have difficulty paying their rent, was 65% in Fordham South, compared to the boroughwide and citywide rates of 58% and 51% respectively. In 2018, an estimated 26% of Fordham North residents lived in poverty, compared to 25% in all of the Bronx and 20% in all of New York City. One in seven residents (14%) were unemployed, compared to 13% in the Bronx and 9% in New York City. Rent burden, or the percentage of residents who have difficulty paying their rent, was 61% in Fordham North, compared to the boroughwide and citywide rates of 58% and 51% respectively. Based on this calculation, as of 2018, both areas were considered low-income relative to the rest of the city and not gentrifying.

== Land use and terrain ==
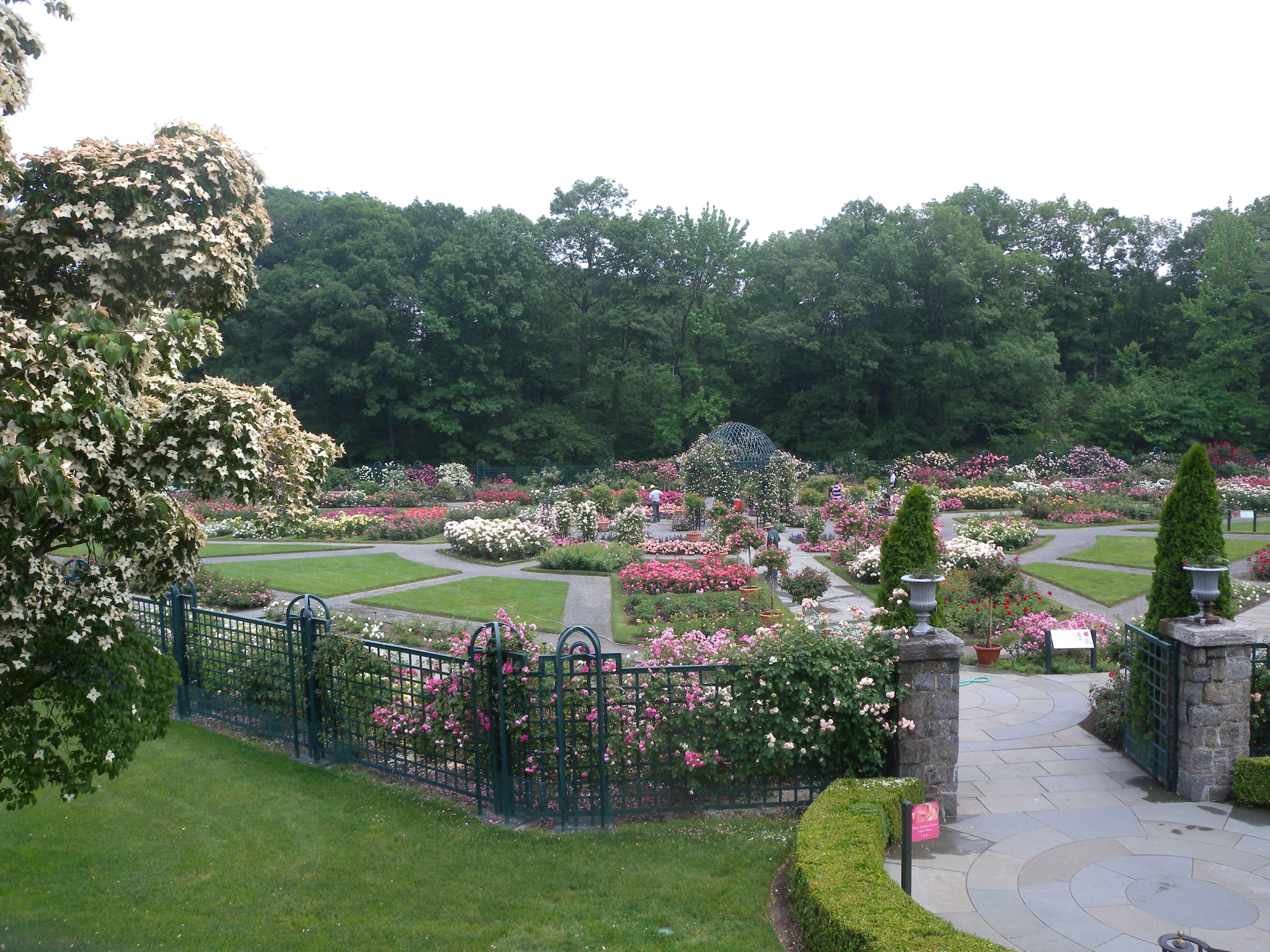
The New York Botanical Garden rose garden.

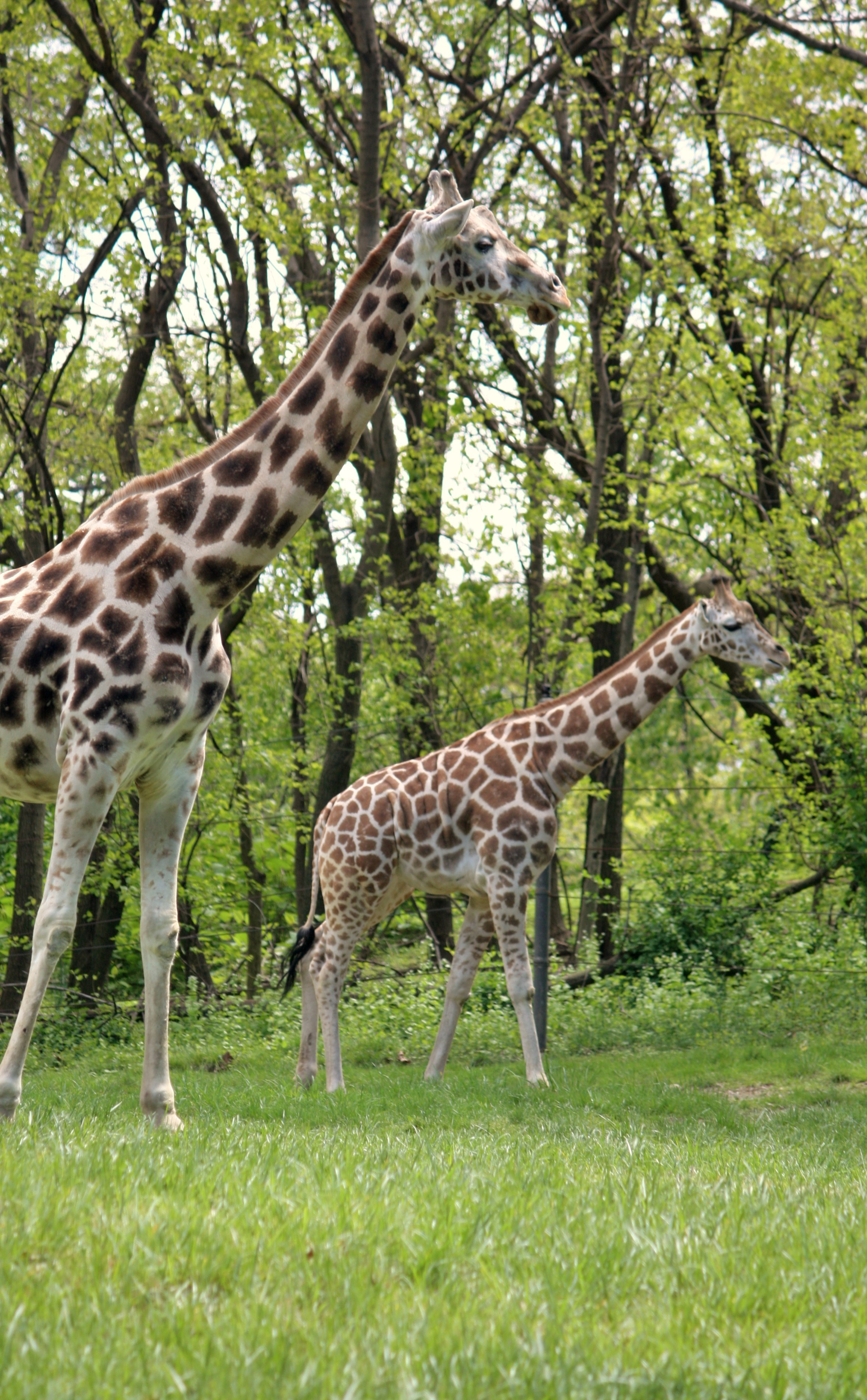
Giraffes at the Bronx Zoo

Fordham is dominated by 5- and 6-story apartment buildings, often set flush to the sidewalk. Many of the apartments on the Grand Concourse are taller.

The New York Botanical Garden and the Wildlife Conservation Society's Bronx Zoo, both inside Bronx Park, collectively occupy dozens of acres of land within the neighborhood.

Fordham University maintains its historic original campus on much of the former Rose Hill Manor in the center of the neighborhood. It is one of the largest "green" campuses in New York City, and its traditional collegiate gothic architecture often serves as a backdrop for television and film productions.

The Fordham Road Business Improvement District operates on the northern border of the neighborhood. This retail district is the longest in the Bronx. Fordham is split into two community districts: Community District 5 south of Fordham Road and Community District 7 north of Fordham Road. Community District 5, which comprises southern Fordham South, had 136,151 inhabitants as of NYC Health's 2018 Community Health Profile, with an average life expectancy of 79.9 years. Community District 7, which comprises Fordham South and Bedford Park, had 148,163 inhabitants as of NYC Health's 2018 Community Health Profile, with an average life expectancy of 79.4 years. Both figures are lower than the median life expectancy of 81.2 for all New York City neighborhoods.

== Police and crime ==
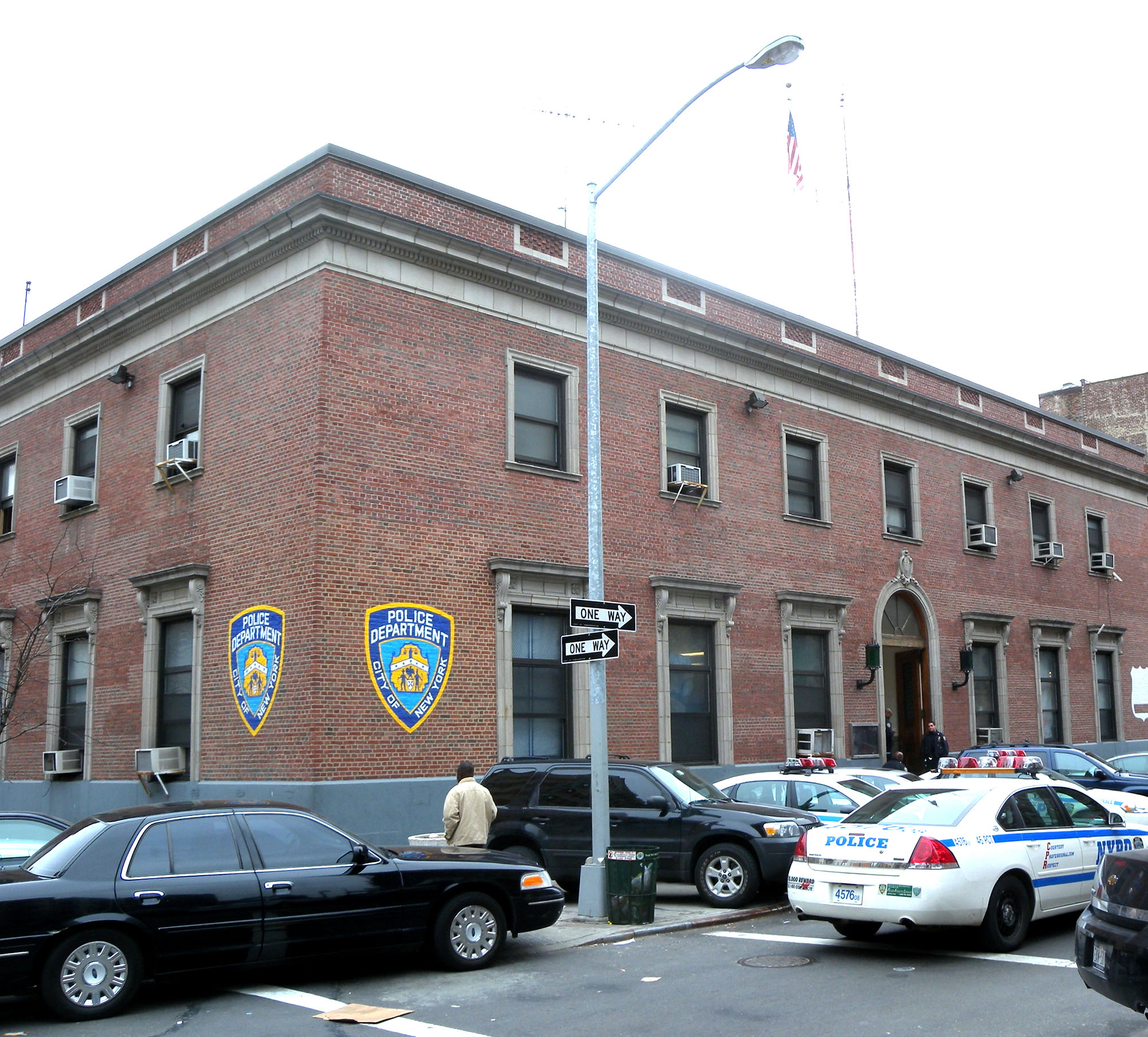
46th Police Precinct

Fordham is patrolled by two precincts of the New York City Police Department (NYPD). Fordham South is served by the 46th Precinct of the NYPD, located at 2120 Ryer Avenue. Fordham North is patrolled by the 52nd Precinct of the NYPD, located at 3016 Webster Avenue.

The 46th Precinct ranked 27th-safest out of 69 patrol areas for per-capita crime in 2010, while the 52nd Precinct ranked 49th-safest. As of 2018, with a non-fatal assault rate of 126 per 100,000 people in Fordham South and 97 per 100,000 people in Fordham North, Fordham's rate of violent crimes per capita was greater than that of the city as a whole. The incarceration rates of 1,033 per 100,000 people in Fordham South and 583 per 100,000 people in Fordham Road were both higher than that of the city as a whole.

The 46th Precinct has a lower crime rate than in the 1990s, with crimes across all categories having decreased by 71.3% between 1990 and 2025. The precinct reported 7 murders, 34 rapes, 365 robberies, 756 felony assaults, 175 burglaries, 567 grand larcenies, and 216 grand larcenies auto in 2025. The 52nd Precinct also has a lower crime rate than in the 1990s, with crimes across all categories having decreased by 67.4% between 1990 and 2025. The precinct reported 6 murders, 45 rapes, 445 robberies, 804 felony assaults, 199 burglaries, 796 grand larcenies, and 278 grand larcenies auto in 2025.

== Fire safety ==
Fordham has two New York City Fire Department (FDNY) fire stations. Engine Co. 48/Ladder Co. 56/Division 7 is located at 2417 Webster Avenue, while Engine Co. 75/Ladder Co. 33/Battalion 19 is located at 2175 Walton Avenue.

== Health ==
As of 2018, preterm births in Fordham South and births to teenage mothers in both Fordham South and North were more common than in other places citywide, though preterm births in Fordham North were less common. In Fordham South, there were 93 preterm births per 1,000 live births (compared to 87 per 1,000 citywide), and 35.3 births to teenage mothers per 1,000 live births (compared to 19.3 per 1,000 citywide). In Fordham North, there were 85 preterm births per 1,000 live births (compared to 87 per 1,000 citywide), and 30.3 births to teenage mothers per 1,000 live births (compared to 19.3 per 1,000 citywide). Both areas have a relatively high population of residents who are uninsured. In 2018, this population of uninsured residents was estimated to be 14% in Fordham South and 16% in Fordham North, higher than the citywide rate of 12%.

The concentration of fine particulate matter, the deadliest type of air pollutant, is 0.0083 milligrams per cubic metre (8.3×10^{−9} oz/ft^{3}) in Fordham South and 0.0078 milligrams per cubic metre (7.8×10^{−9} oz/ft^{3}) in Fordham North, more than the city average. Sixteen percent of Fordham South residents and 12% of Fordham North residents are smokers, which is higher in Fordham South than the city average of 14% of residents being smokers. In Fordham South, 34% of residents are obese, 16% are diabetic, and 27% have high blood pressure—compared to the citywide averages of 24%, 11%, and 28% respectively. In Fordham North, 33% of residents are obese, 19% are diabetic, and 35% have high blood pressure. In addition, 24% of children in Fordham South and 25% of children in Fordham North are obese, compared to the citywide average of 20%.

Seventy-eight percent of residents in Fordham South and 84% in Fordham North eat some fruits and vegetables daily, which is less than the city's average of 87%. In 2018, 67% of residents in both Fordham South and North described their health as "good", "very good", or "excellent", lower than the city's average of 78%. For every supermarket, there are 20 bodegas in Fordham South and 18 in Fordham North.

The nearest hospitals are Bronx-Lebanon Hospital Center in Claremont, James J. Peters VA Medical Center in Kingsbridge Heights, and St Barnabas Hospital in Belmont.

== Politics ==
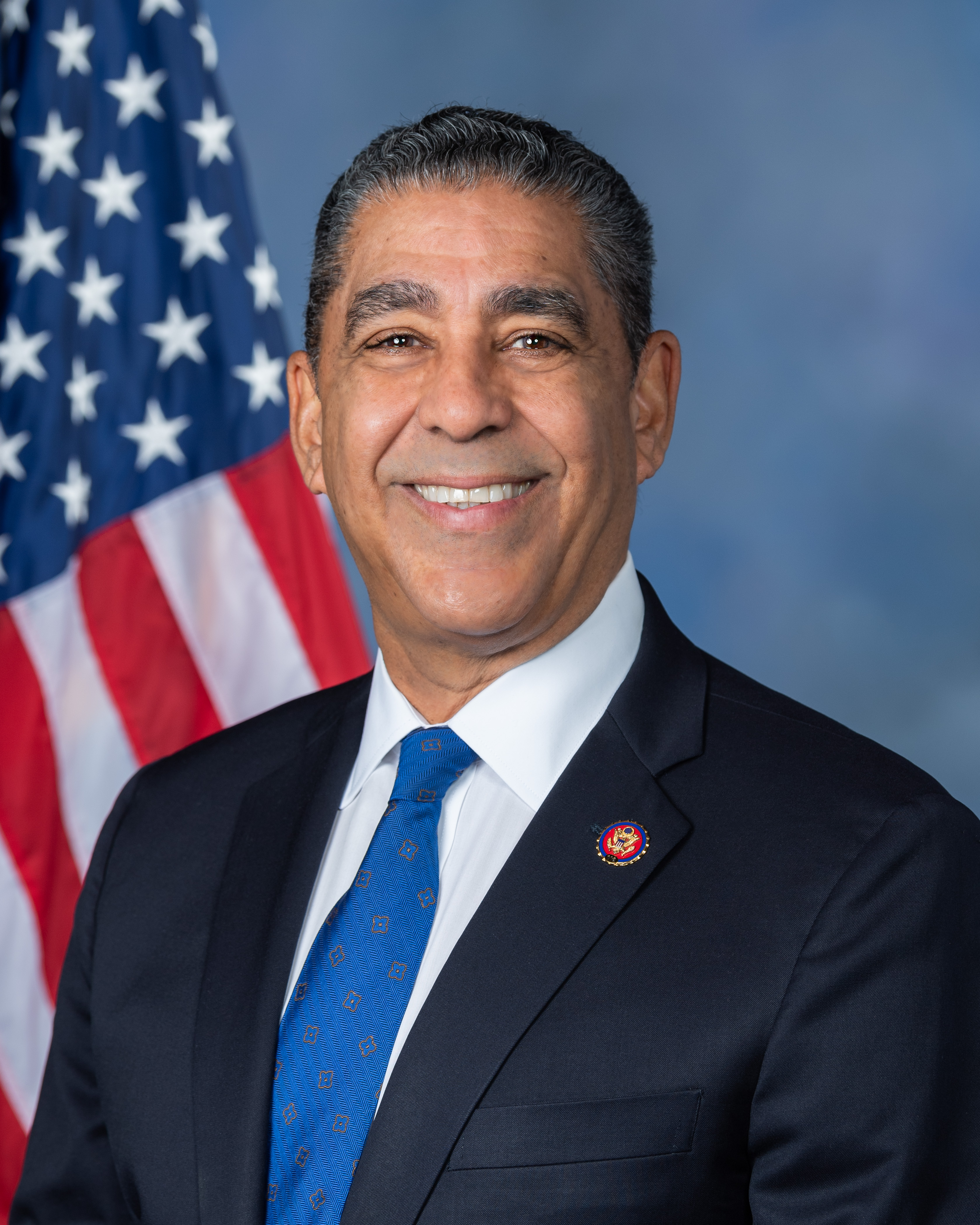
Adriano Espaillat

Politically, Fordham is in New York's 13th congressional district for the U.S. House of Representatives represented by Democrat Adriano Espaillat since 2017. On the state level, it is also part of the 33rd New York State Senate District, represented by Democrat Gustavo Rivera and the 34th New York State Senate District represented by Democrat Nathalia Fernandez. In the New York State Assembly, it spans several districts, and is primarily represented by Democrats George Alvarez (78th District), Yudelka Tapia (86th District), and Karines Reyes (87th District). On the city level, the neighborhood is primarily part of the New York City Council 15th district, represented by Democrat Oswald Feliz.

== Post office and ZIP Codes ==
Fordham is divided into four ZIP Codes by the north-south Grand Concourse and the west-east East 183rd Street. Counterclockwise from southwest, these zip codes are 10453, 10457, 10458, and 10468. The United States Postal Service operates the Jerome Station post office at 2549 Jerome Avenue.

== Education ==
Fordham generally had a lower rate of college-educated residents than the rest of the city as of 2018. In Fordham South, 10% of residents age 25 and older had a college education or higher, while 34% had less than a high school education, and 46% were high school graduates or had some college education. In Fordham North, 23% of residents age 25 and older had a college education or higher, while 32% had less than a high school education, and 45% were high school graduates or had some college education. By contrast, 26% of Bronx residents and 43% of city residents had a college education or higher. The percentage of Fordham South students excelling in math rose from 19% in 2000 to 43% in 2011, and reading achievement increased from 24% to 28% during the same time period. The percentage of Fordham North students excelling in math also rose from 21% in 2000 to 48% in 2011, and reading achievement increased from 28% to 33% during the same period.

Fordham South and Fordham North's rates of elementary school student absenteeism are higher than the rest of New York City. 30% of elementary school students in Fordham South and 28% in Fordham North missed 20 or more days per school year, higher than the citywide average of 20%. Additionally, 66% of high school students in Fordham South and 70% of high school students in Fordham North graduate on time, lower than the citywide average of 75%.

=== Schools ===
Fordham has the following public elementary schools:

- PS 33 Timothy Dwight (grades PK–5)
- PS/IS 54 (grades PK–5)
- PS 159 Luis Muñoz Marin Biling (grades K–5)
- PS 246 Poe Center (grades K–5)
- Academy for Personal Leadership and Excellence (grades PK–8)

The Jonas Bronck Academy serves grades 6–8.

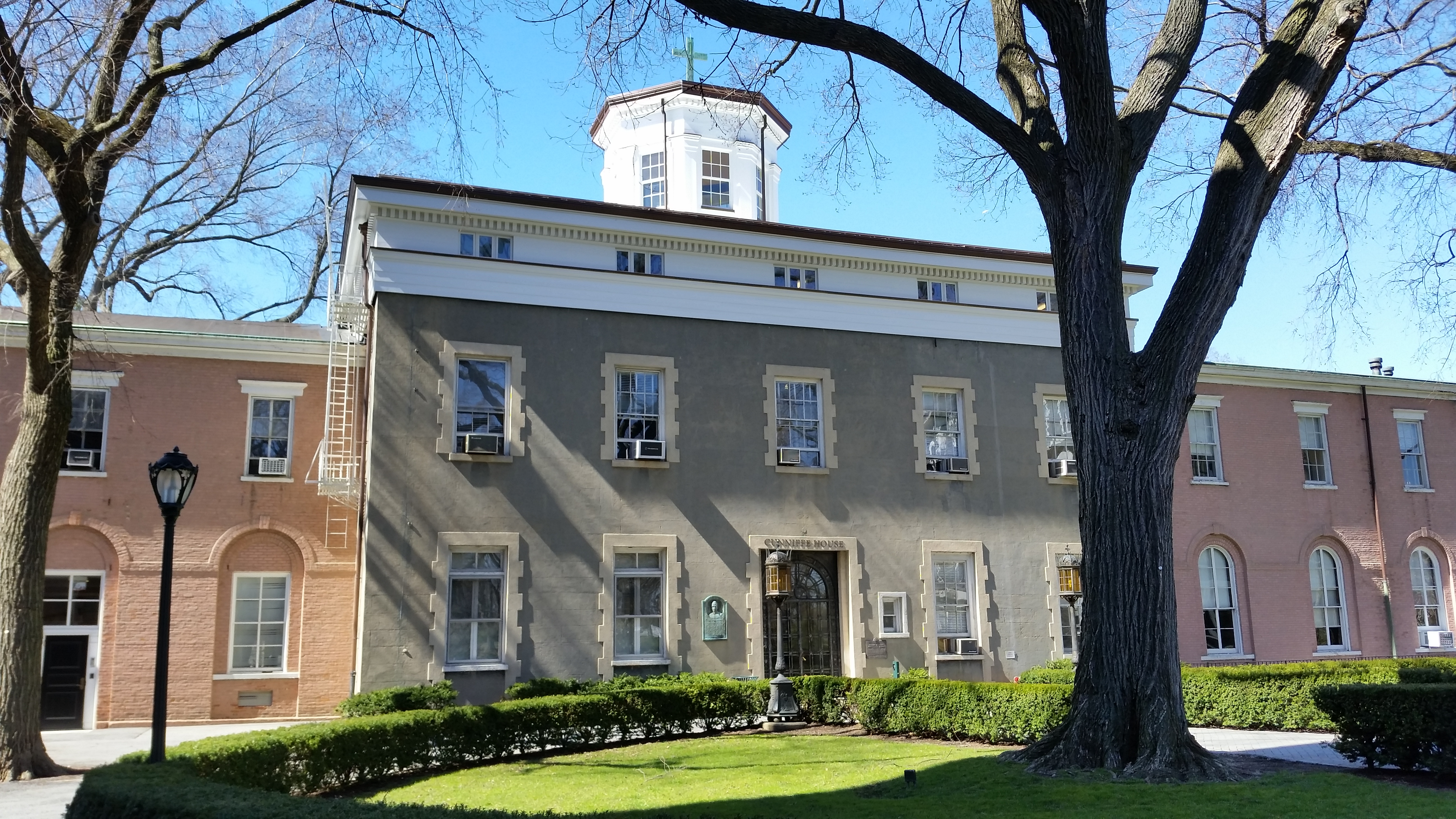
Cunniffe House, the Fordham University administration building at Rose Hill, constructed in 1838 and one of the oldest buildings on campus

The Rose Hill campus of Fordham University, which is the university's oldest campus, is located in Fordham. The campus is home to Fordham College at Rose Hill, the Gabelli School of Business, and a division of the School of Professional and Continuing Studies, as well as the Graduate Schools of Arts and Sciences and Religion and Religious Education.

Monroe College, a private for-profit college, has been located in Fordham since 1967, and is near the Fordham shopping district.

=== Library ===
The New York Public Library (NYPL) operates the Bronx Library Center at 310 East Kingsbridge Road. The Bronx Library Center opened in 2006, and is the Bronx's largest NYPL branch.

== Transportation ==
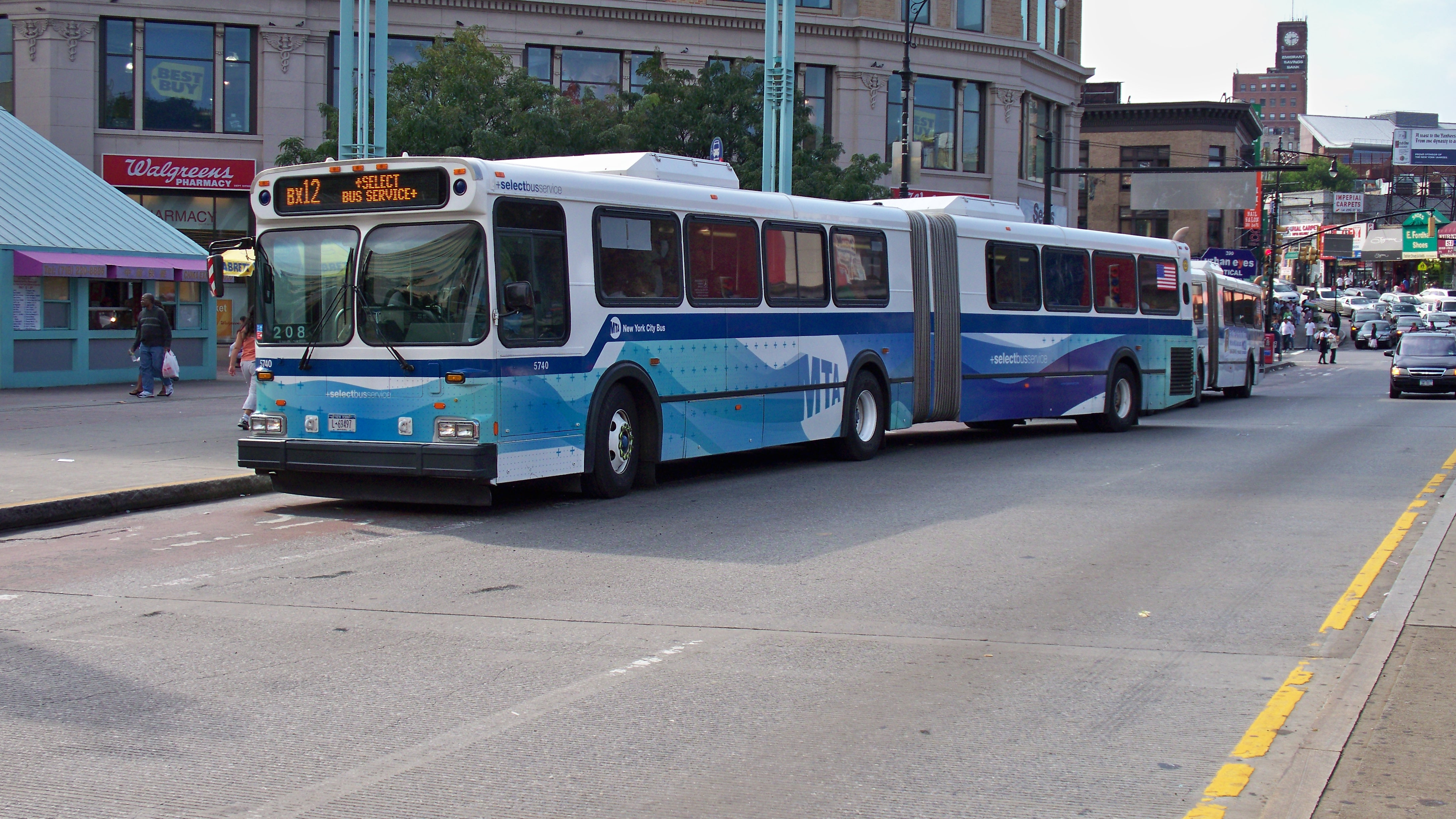
The Bx12 Select Bus Service stops in front of Fordham Plaza above Fordham's Metro-North railroad station.

Subway and railroad service is provided by the New York City Subway and Metro-North Railroad, respectively.

- Fordham Road station (4 train)
- Kingsbridge Road station (4 train)
- 182nd–183rd Streets (B and D trains)
- Fordham Road station (B and D trains)
- Fordham Station (Metro-North)

The following MTA Regional Bus Operations bus routes serve Fordham:

- Bx1: to Riverdale or Mott Haven (via Grand Concourse)
- Bx2: to Kingsbridge Heights or Mott Haven (via Grand Concourse)
- Bx3: to Riverdale or Washington Heights, George Washington Bridge (via University Avenue)
- Bx9: to Riverdale or West Farms Square – East Tremont Avenue station (2 and 5 trains) (via Kingsbridge Road)
- Bx12 (Including Select Bus Service): to Bay Plaza Shopping Center or Inwood – 207th Street station (A train) (via Fordham Road–Pelham Parkway)
- Bx15: to The Hub (via Third Avenue)
- Bx19: to New York Botanical Garden or Riverbank State Park (via Southern Boulevard & East 149th Street)
- Bx17: to Port Morris (via Prospect-Crotona Avenues)
- Bx22: to Bedford Park or Castle Hill (via Castle Hill Avenue)
- Bx28: to Co-op City (via Gun Hill Road)
- Bx34: to Woodlawn (via Bainbridge Avenue)
- Bx38: to Bay Plaza Shopping Center (via Gun Hill Road) (Sunday nights only)
- Bx41 (Including Select Bus Service): to Williamsbridge or Third Avenue – 149th Street station (2 and 5 trains, via Webster Avenue)

Fordham is also served by the following Bee-Line Bus System routes to Westchester County, New York:

- BL60: to White Plains, New York (via Boston Road)
- BL61: to Port Chester, New York (via Boston Road)
- BL62: to White Plains, New York (via Boston Road)

== Notable people ==
- Don DeLillo, novelist, short story writer, playwright, screenwriter and essayist.
- Chazz Palminteri , actor, producer, screenwriter, and playwright.
- Edgar Allan Poe, writer, poet, editor, and literary critic .
- Lil Tjay, Rapper

== See also ==
- Fordham Plaza
- Norwood News
