= Mike Nieves =

President and CEO of Hispanic Information Television Network

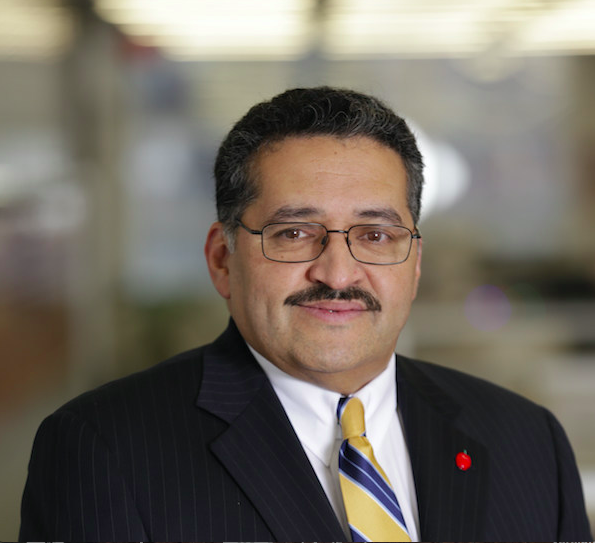
Michael D. Nieves

Michael D. Nieves is the president and CEO of Hispanic Information Television Network (HITN), the largest non-commercial, Spanish language television network in the United States. Since taking the role in 2015, HITN has added over 10 million new Latino households to its viewing audience and secured a partnership with Sprint Communications that will support HITN’s mission for at least the next 30 years.

Prior to HITN, Nieves was a senior political adviser to Democratic elected officials throughout New York State, and the deputy chief of staff to three successive New York City Council Speakers.

Amongst those he has counseled and represented are City Council Speakers Christine Quinn, Gifford Miller and Peter Vallone; City Council Majority Leader Joel Rivera; Assemblyman and Bronx Democratic leader José Rivera; Manhattan Borough President C. Virginia Fields; and Assemblyman Nelson Denis.

== HITN ==
Since taking the role in 2015 Mr. Nieves has pushed the boundaries of HITN’s commitment to provide its viewers with educational and entertaining content by working with some of the most important producers in the world from BBC, Discovery, NatGeo, and CNET to create a carefully curated list of programs for its viewers. Also, under his stewardship, HITN has added 10 million new households to its viewing audience to now reach more than 44 million households nationwide. HITN has even received three Emmy nominations in 2016—its first time since HITN’s inception in 1981.

During the 2016 election, Nieves conceived the HITN original production, Tu Momento, a Spanish language television program explaining the US electoral process from state primaries and caucuses, to Inauguration Day. The program was awarded the Social Good Leader Award of 2016 by Cynopsis Media, publisher of trade publications for the television, media, digital, and sports TV industries. Since Nieves' arrival, HITN has received three Emmy nominations, its first nominations since its inception in 1981.

== Early life ==
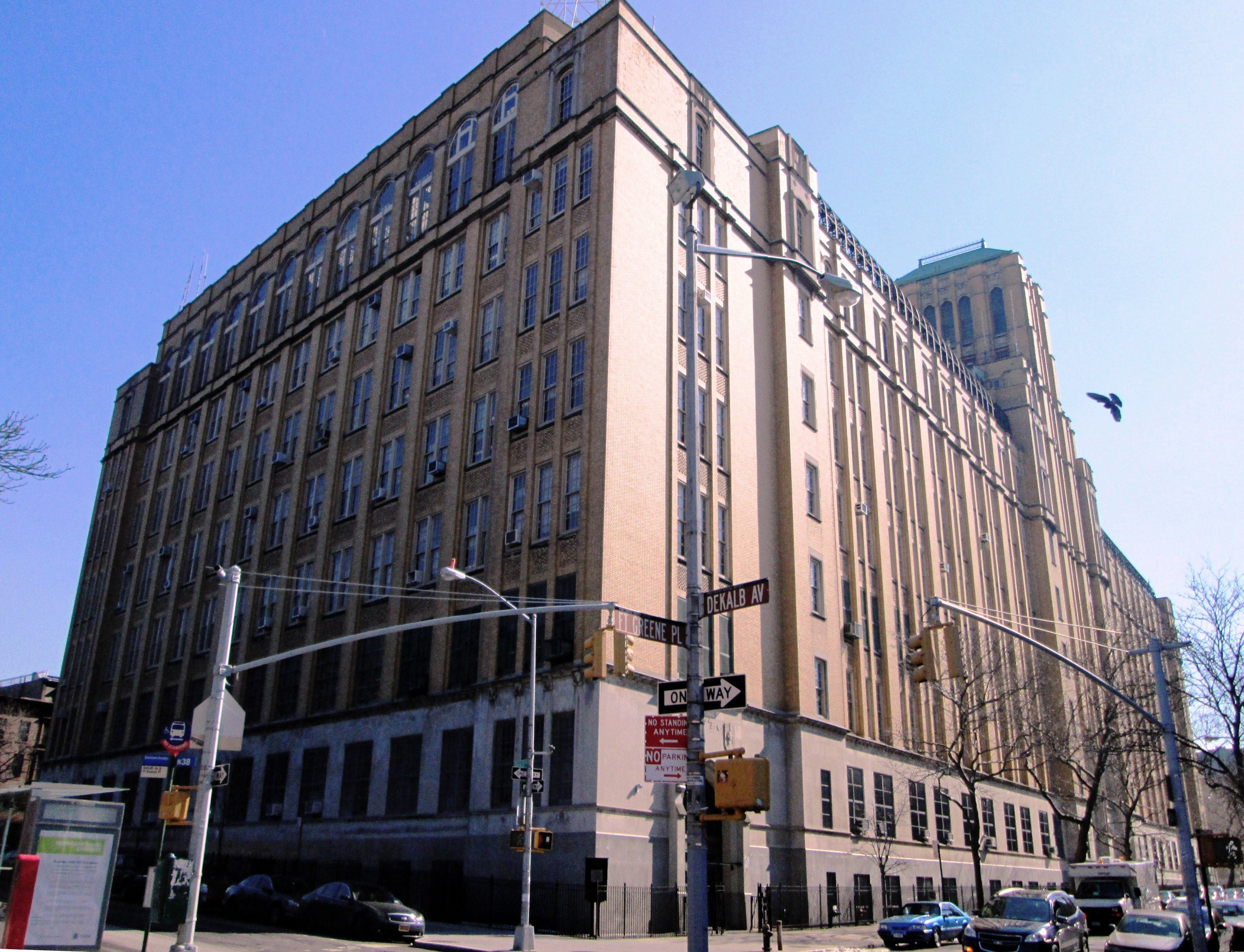
Brooklyn Tech High School

Nieves’ parents moved to New York from Puerto Rico (Puerto Ricans were American citizens from 1915). His father, Candido Nieves, worked many years at Interboro Hospital in Brooklyn. His mother Andrea was an active member of St. Barbara's Parish in Bushwick, and also the East Brooklyn Churches.

For nearly thirty years, since the mid-1980s, Nieves was also active in St. Barbara's Parish in Bushwick, Brooklyn.

Nieves graduated from the competitive Brooklyn Technical High School and York College, and founded the management consulting firm of Nieves Associates.

Nieves and his wife have a daughter named Daniela.

== Community and educational work ==
His community involvements include the boards of the National Museum of Puerto Rican Arts and Culture in Chicago, National Hispanic Caucus of State Legislators, SOMOS New York, New York City Public Schools Community School Board #32, and the New York Puerto Rican Day Parade. Mr. Nieves was listed as an honoree of City and State’s 50 over Fifty and was awarded “Hero of the Month” by Brooklyn Borough President Eric L. Adams for his relief efforts in Puerto Rico after Hurricane Maria. Also, he was recognized as one of City and State’s 100 Responsible Corporate Social Responsibility figures. He and his family are active members of St. Barbara’s Catholic Church in Brooklyn, NY.

Nieves served on the District 32 community school board in Brooklyn, and was the coordinator of the Puerto Rican Day Parade. He is a co-founder and board member of the New Beginnings Charter School in Brooklyn, New York.

One of Nieves' most significant long-term projects was the physical and educational renovation of St. Barbara's Parish. Together with Father Mason, Nieves helped to organize a major fundraising drive that generated over $500,000 from the congregation, and enabled a complete renovation of the church property in 1993: including the steeples and church bells, the church dome, and even the 1931 Möller pipe organ.

As a follow-up to this renovation, in 2009, the Pope John II Family Academy opened at the church. The school is extremely successful, its enrollment is full, and it has a long waiting list.

Currently, St. Barbara's Parish is one of the most vibrant churches in Brooklyn. According to Father Fulgencio Gutierrez, the current pastor and head chaplain, when the church bell peals on Sunday, every bilingual mass in St. Barbara's is now standing room only.

In the wake of the devastation by Hurricane Maria, Nieves has spearheaded HITN’s relief efforts in Puerto Rico and has also, in keeping with HITN’s focus on education, community, and economic and cultural development, HITN launched its new series, Puerto Rico Contigo. The series’ thirteen thirty-minute episodes, airing both in Puerto Rico and in the continental United States, present Puerto Rico’s economic situation with diverse perspectives from small and larger businesses, nonprofit organizations, and civic and government agencies, with interviews of men and women whose creativity and resilience serve as models and inspiration for further rebuilding of the Puerto Rican economy. The series Puerto Rico Contigo has begun to air due to a new partnership between HITN and the Puerto Rico Public Broadcasting Corporation (WIPR).

== Government career ==
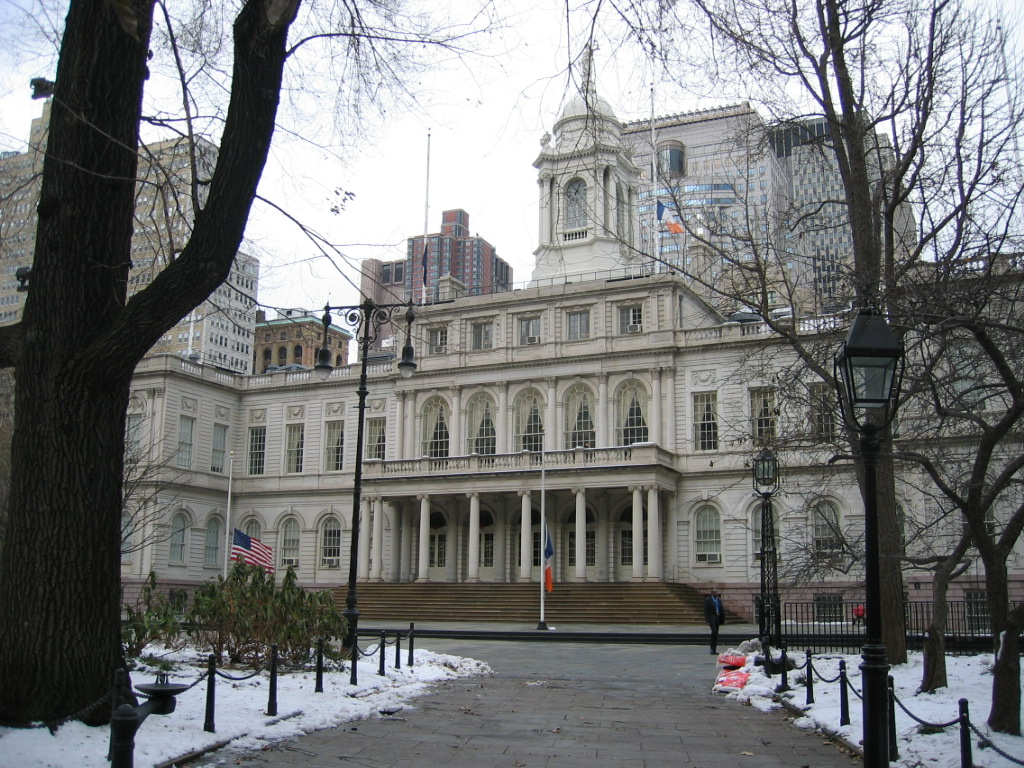
City Hall of New York

For over 25 years, Nieves has helped build the political landscape in New York by serving as strategic and policy advisor and consultant to numerous elected officials and campaigns across New York City and New York State.

Campaigns have included the elections of state and city representatives, borough presidents, members of Congress, and judicial candidates. Among those Nieves served are Assemblyman and former Bronx Democratic leader José Rivera, Majority Leader Joel Rivera, Assemblyman Nelson Denis, former Congressman Charles Rangel (D-NY), New York City Civil Court Judge Lisa Headley, and Transit Workers Union Local 100.

In 2015, Mr. Nieves served as a key strategic advisor to the Jesus “Chuy” Garcia campaign in Chicago, which resulted in Chicago’s first-ever run-off election for the mayoralty. He has also served as an advisor on educational policy to the government of Puerto Rico.

As deputy chief of staff to three successive New York City Council speakers, Nieves assisted Council Members with the development of thousands of new affordable housing units throughout New York City, and the creation of hundreds of job initiatives throughout the five boroughs.

As Director of State and Federal Affairs, Nieves served as the liaison between the New York City Council and the Governor's Office of the State of New York, and the New York State Legislature. In this capacity, Nieves was also the principal lobbyist for the New York City Council concerning all home-rule legislation and all State-related matters.

Before serving as Director of State and Federal Affairs, Nieves was the Deputy Director for Council Services, where he was responsible for overseeing the administrative functions and internal budget of the New York City Council and its 51 Council Members.

As a long-time community school board member and co-founder of the New Beginnings Charter School, Nieves also advised the Black, Latino and Asian Caucus of the New York City Council, on a broad spectrum of educational issues.

Nieves was also the long-term adviser to Assemblyman José Rivera, who was also the Democratic County Leader of the Bronx.

== New York City Council campaign ==
In 2013, Nieves announced his candidacy for the New York City Council for the 37th district of Brooklyn – encompassing Bushwick; Cypress Hills; and portions of East New York, Ocean-Hill, Brownsville and Wyckoff Heights. After raising approximately $23,000, Nieves announced he was dropping out of the race. When the required signatures for being placed on the ballot were challenged, he stated the money he raised had been exhausted due to lawyer fees associated with fighting the challenge.

== Political consulting ==
Among Latino elected officials, Mr. Nieves is renowned for his expertise in political strategy, public policy, and election law. From 1989 to 1999, prior to his government service, he was principal and owner of Nieves Associates, a consulting firm instrumental in advising and consulting to Latino and other candidates and elected officials. From 2010 to 2015, he was CEO of Michael Nieves Consulting, continuing to share his expertise with both candidates and elected officials. Mr. Nieves is hailed by many as one of the top Latino political operatives in the State of New York. He has also served as an advisor on educational policy to the government of Puerto Rico.

== Honors and recognition ==
His community involvements include the boards of the National Museum of Puerto Rican Arts and Culture in Chicago, National Hispanic Caucus of State Legislators, SOMOS New York, New York City Public Schools Community School Board #32, and the New York Puerto Rican Day Parade. Mr. Nieves was listed as an honoree of City and State’s 50 over Fifty and was awarded “Hero of the Month” by Brooklyn Borough President Eric L. Adams for his relief efforts in Puerto Rico after Hurricane Maria. Also, he was recognized as one of City and State’s 100 Responsible Corporate Social Responsibility figures. He and his family are active members of St. Barbara’s Catholic Church in Brooklyn, NY.

== See also ==
- New York City Council
- New York State Legislature
- Puerto Rican Day Parade
- Bushwick, Brooklyn
- East New York
- Cypress Hills
- Brownsville
