= George Alvarez (politician) =

American-Dominican politician

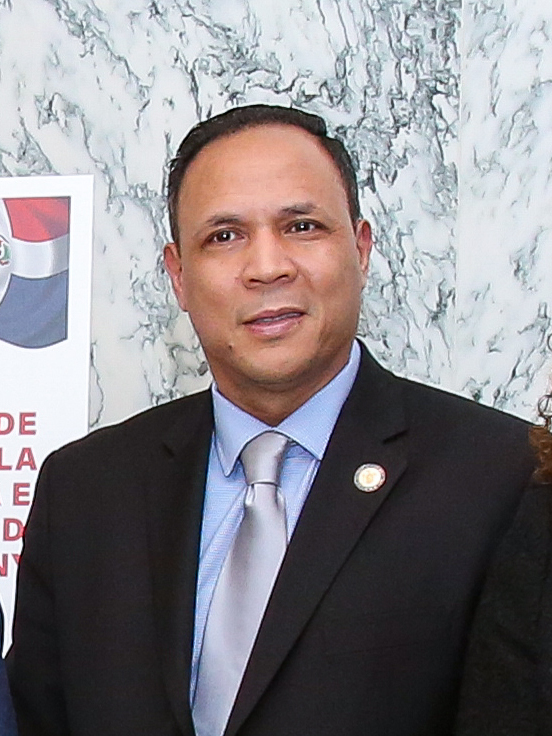

Member of the New York State Assembly from the 78th district
- Incumbent
- Assumed office January 3, 2023
- Preceded by: Jose Rivera

Personal details
- Born: Dominican Republic
- Party: Democratic
- Education: Mother and Teacher Pontifical Catholic University (BS); EADA Business School (MA); City University of New York (MS)
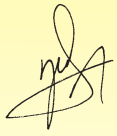
- Signature
- Website: State Assembly website

George Alvarez is an American politician who currently represents the 78th District of the New York State Assembly as a Democrat.

== Early life ==
Alvarez was born in the Dominican Republic with an Afro-Caribbean background. He graduated with a degree in Computer Science in the Dominican Republic before earning a master's degree in Logistics in Madrid, Spain. Raised in a single parent household, his family moved to the Bronx, where Alvarez was a community leader.

== Political career ==
Alvarez started his political career by serving as a member of Community board 1. He also served as the vice-president of the Bronx Democratic Party. Alvarez challenged four decade incumbent Jose Rivera in the primary for the 78th District. Although Rivera was the heavy favorite to win the election, in no small part due to the PACs supporting him, Alvarez defeated the Assemblyman with 49% of the vote to his 28%. .

Alvarez has been a vocal supporter of the New York Clean Slate Act which, if passed, will seal the records of some convicts upon their release from prison, in an effort to increase their integration into society, lower re-offending rates, and allow them to maintain stable jobs.

=== Committee Membership ===
- Code
- Consumer Affairs and Protection
- Labor
- Real Property Taxation
- Transportation
- Black, Puerto Rico, Hispanic & Asian Legislative Caucus
- Puerto Rican/Hispanic Task Force
