= Jose Rivera (politician) =

American politician (born 1936)

José Rivera
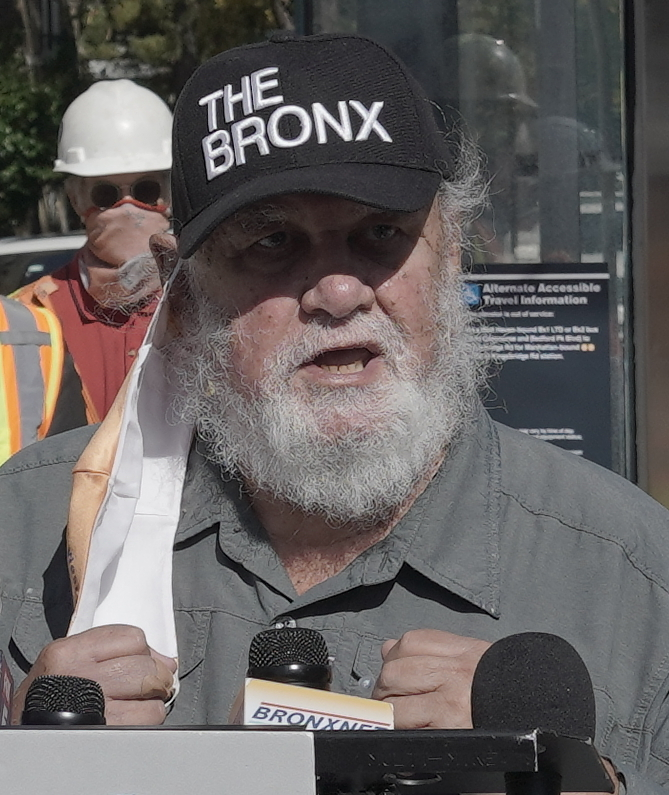

Member of the New York State Assembly from the 78th District
- In office January 3, 2001 – December 31, 2022
- Preceded by: Roberto Ramirez
- Succeeded by: George Alvarez
- In office January 3, 1983 - December 23, 1987
- Preceded by: Armando Montano
- Succeeded by: Israel Martinez

Member of the New York City Council from the 15th district
- In office December 23, 1987 - December 31, 2000
- Preceded by: Fernando Ferrer
- Succeeded by: Joel Rivera

Personal details
- Born: July 30, 1936 (age 90) San Juan, Puerto Rico
- Party: Democratic
- Children: Joel Rivera, Naomi Rivera

José Rivera (born July 30, 1936) is a former politician who served in the New York State Assembly from 2001 to 2022, representing the Fordham-Bedford, Kingsbridge Heights, Bedford Park, and Belmont sections of the Bronx. He is a member of the Democratic Party.

== Biography ==
Rivera was born in 1936 in San Juan, Puerto Rico. He was a member of the New York State Assembly from 1983 to 1987, sitting in the 185th, 186th and 187th New York State Legislatures. He was a member of the New York City Council from 1987 to 2000. Rivera was elected again to the State Assembly in 2000, and was the head of the Democratic Party in the Bronx from 2002 until he was ousted in 2008 by the so-called Rainbow Rebels.

Prior to his election to the Assembly in 1982, Rivera gained prominence as a labor advocate and organizer of construction workers and "gypsy" taxicab drivers.

During his tenure as County Leader of the Bronx, Rivera was frequently advised by Mike Nieves, a Democratic party consultant and strategist. Rivera was a vocal advocate for the withdrawal of the U.S. Navy from its bombing range on the island of Vieques, Puerto Rico, and was arrested in 2001, together with Al Sharpton and other political figures, for trespassing onto the Navy's Vieques facility. The Navy subsequently agreed to withdraw from the Vieques facility. Two of his children, Joel Rivera and Naomi Rivera, were formerly elected officials in the Bronx, and were members of the New York City Council and New York State Assembly, respectively.

In the 2022 Democratic primary, Rivera lost his re-nomination bid to George Alvarez.

New York State Assembly
Preceded by Armando Montano	New York State Assembly; 77th district 1983–1987	Succeeded by Israel Martinez
Preceded by Roberto Ramirez	New York State Assembly; 78th district 2001–2022	Succeeded by George Alvarez
New York City Council
Preceded by Fernando Ferrer	New York City Council; 13th district 1988–1991	Succeeded by Michael DeMarco
Preceded by Walter Ward	New York City Council; 15th district 1992–2000	Succeeded by Joel Rivera
Party political offices
Preceded by Roberto Ramirez	Chairman of the Executive Committee of the Bronx County Democratic Committee; 2002 - 2008	Succeeded by Carl Heastie
