= New York's 78th State Assembly district =

American legislative district

Assemblymember
George Alvarez; D–Fordham

New York's 78th State Assembly district is one of the 150 districts in the New York State Assembly. It has been represented by Democrat George Alvarez since 2023, defeating then-incumbent Jose Rivera.

== Geography ==
=== 2020s ===
District 78 is located in The Bronx, containing the neighborhoods of Kingsbridge Heights, portions of Fordham, Bedford Park, and Belmont. Portions of Bronx Park, including the campus of Fordham University, lie within the district.

The district overlaps (partially) with New York's 13th and 15th congressional districts, as well as the 31st, 32nd and 33rd districts of the New York State Senate and the 11th, 14th and 15th districts of the New York City Council.

=== 2010s ===
District 78 is located in The Bronx, containing the neighborhoods of Kingsbridge Heights, portions of Fordham, Bedford Park, and Belmont.

== Recent election results ==
=== 2026 ===
2026 New York State Assembly election, District 78
Party	Candidate	Votes	%
Democratic	George Alvarez		
Working Families	George Alvarez		
Total	George Alvarez (incumbent)		
Write-in			
Total votes			100.0

=== 2024 ===
2024 New York State Assembly election, District 78
Party	Candidate	Votes	%
Democratic	George Alvarez (incumbent)	17,254	73.3
Republican	John Santiago	5,674	
Conservative	John Santiago	555	
Total	John Santiago	6,229	26.5
Write-in		47	0.2
Total votes		23,530	100.0
Democratic hold			

=== 2022 ===
2022 New York State Assembly election, District 78
Primary election
Party	Candidate	Votes	%
Democratic	George Alvarez	1,923	47.1
Democratic	Jose Rivera (incumbent)	1,147	28.1
Democratic	Emmanuel Martinez	988	24.2
Write-in		24	0.6
Total votes		4,082	100.0
General election
Democratic	George Alvarez	9,059	80.8
Republican	Michael Dister	2,140	19.1
Write-in		17	1.1
Total votes		11,216	100.0
Democratic hold			

=== 2020 ===
2020 New York State Assembly election, District 78
Primary election
Party	Candidate	Votes	%
Democratic	Jose Rivera (incumbent)	5,803	83.1
Democratic	Francisco Spies	1,049	15.0
Write-in		134	1.9
Total votes		6,986	100.0
General election
Democratic	Jose Rivera (incumbent)	25,920	86.7
Republican	Michael Dister	3,560	11.9
Write-in		410	1.4
Total votes		29,890	100.0
Democratic hold			

=== 2018 ===
2018 New York State Assembly election, District 78
Party	Candidate	Votes	%
Democratic	Jose Rivera (incumbent)	17,212	93.3
Republican	Michael Walters	1,040	
Conservative	Michael Walters	169	
Total	Michael Walters	1,209	6.6
Write-in		23	0.1
Total votes		18,444	100.0
Democratic hold			

=== 2016 ===
2016 New York State Assembly election, District 78
Primary election
Party	Candidate	Votes	%
Democratic	Jose Rivera (incumbent)	2,236	65.2
Democratic	Ischia Bravo	1,185	34.5
Write-in		10	0.3
Total votes		3,431	100.0
General election
Democratic	Jose Rivera	21,228	
Working Families	Jose Rivera	687	
Total	Jose Rivera (incumbent)	21,915	93.3
Republican	Luana Malavolta	1,172	5.0
Conservative	William Sullivan	366	1.6
Write-in		26	0.1
Total votes		23,479	100.0
Democratic hold			

=== 2014 ===
2014 New York State Assembly election, District 78
Primary election
Party	Candidate	Votes	%
Democratic	Jose Rivera (incumbent)	2,375	77.3
Democratic	Fernando Tirado	677	22.1
Write-in		19	0.6
Total votes		3,071	100.0
General election
Democratic	Jose Rivera (incumbent)	6,965	89.2
Republican	Fernando Tirado	664	
Independence	Fernando Tirado	164	
Total	Fernando Tirado	828	10.6
Write-in		11	0.2
Total votes		7,804	100.0
Democratic hold			

=== 2012 ===
2012 New York State Assembly election, District 78
Primary election
Party	Candidate	Votes	%
Democratic	Jose Rivera (incumbent)	1,813	77.4
Democratic	Ricardo Martinez	513	21.9
Write-in		17	0.7
Total votes		2,343	100.0
General election
Democratic	Jose Rivera (incumbent)	20,241	94.0
Republican	Luana Malavolta	990	4.6
Conservative	Richard Retcho	301	1.4
Write-in		9	0.0
Total votes		21,541	100.0
Democratic hold			

=== 2010 ===
2010 New York State Assembly election, District 78
Primary election
Party	Candidate	Votes	%
Democratic	Jose Rivera (incumbent)	2,641	75.9
Democratic	Sergio Villaverde	826	23.7
Write-in		13	0.4
Total votes		3,480	100.0
General election
Democratic	Jose Rivera	8,611	
Working Families	Jose Rivera	578	
Total	Jose Rivera (incumbent)	9,189	90.2
Republican	William Sullivan	824	
Conservative	William Sullivan	166	
Total	William Sullivan	990	9.7
Write-in		10	0.1
Total votes		10,189	100.0
Democratic hold			

=== 2008 ===
2008 New York State Assembly election, District 78
Party	Candidate	Votes	%
Democratic	Jose Rivera (incumbent)	18,452	90.6
Republican	Jose Torres	1,464	
Independence	Jose Torres	237	
Total	Jose Torres	1,701	8.3
Conservative	Robert Lupo II	222	1.1
Write-in		0	0.0
Total votes		20,375	100.0
Democratic hold			
