= Naomi Rivera =

American politician (born 1963)

Member of the New York State Assembly from the 80th district
- In office January 5, 2005 – December 31, 2012
- Preceded by: Jeff Klein
- Succeeded by: Mark Gjonaj

Personal details
- Born: May 10, 1963 (age 63) The Bronx, New York, U.S.
- Party: Democratic
- Relations: Jose Rivera (father); Joel Rivera (half-brother)

Naomi Rivera (born May 10, 1963) is a former United States politician of the Democratic Party who represented District 80 in the New York State Assembly from 2005 to 2012. Her district encompassed Morris Park, Bronx Park East, Pelham Gardens, and Norwood, among other communities located in the Bronx.

Before being elected to the assembly, she previously served as director of special events for the Bronx Borough President's office and deputy chief clerk of the Bronx Board of Elections. On September 13, 2012, Naomi Rivera lost to Mark Gjonaj in the Democratic primary race.

She is the daughter of New York Assemblyman Jose Rivera and sister of New York City Councilman Joel Rivera.

New York State Assembly
Preceded by Jeffrey Klein	New York State Assembly, 80th District; 2005-2012	Succeeded by Mark Gjonaj
