= Hispanic Information and Telecommunications Network =

Spanish-language public broadcasting network

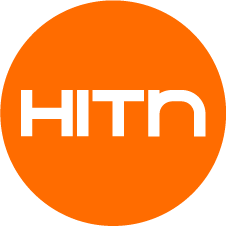
- Country: United States
- Broadcast area: Nationwide
- Headquarters: Brooklyn, New York

Programming
- Languages: Spanish and English

History
- Launched: 1981

Links
- Website: www.hitn.org

Hispanic Information and Telecommunications Network, Inc. (HITN) is the largest Spanish-language public broadcasting network in the United States. It delivers educational programming to over 44 million homes nationwide, and reaches over 40% of US households.

Its distribution network includes Xfinity, DirecTV, DirectTV NOW, Verizon FiOS, Dish Network, Cablevision, AT&T U-verse TV, Charter Communications, Charter Spectrum, Mediacom, CenturyLink Prism, Altice, and a host of smaller distributors.

In 2017, the HITN network was nominated for three Emmy Awards in the arts, community, and public service categories.

== Television network ==
HITN provides non-commercial Spanish-language educational programming in the United States. HITN is a leading Spanish-language media company that offers educational and cultural programming for the whole family. It reaches more than 44 million viewers in the US and Puerto Rico via DIRECTV, DISH Network, AT&T U-verse TV, Verizon FiOS TV, Comcast, Charter Spectrum, Frontier Mediacom, CenturyLink Prism, and Cablevision.

Its most recent original productions include Estudio DC con Gerson Borrero (interviews with leading Latino figures in government, media, music, arts & entertainment, and sports).;Voces (Success stories of Hispanics who have transformed their community in the United States); Puerto Rico Contigo (about the solidarity work and the common effort of the people of the island in the face of adversity); En Foco con Neida Sandoval (interviews and research reports), Mundo CNET (information and the latest news from the technology industry) and Mundo Salvaje con Ron Magill (to discover and learn about the wild animals of the planet).

It also presents Centro Medico, a docudrama with recreations of medical cases in a hospital environment, accompanied by simple explanations and easy-to-understand medical issues relevant to the audience. The first season reached a visualization increase of more than 154%, according to Nielsen's measurements, positioning the show among the five largest audiences of the channel. Last September, HITN presented a 32-hour marathon of the first season. During the television marathon clues were offered for the audience to participate and win a trip for two to Madrid to meet the protagonists and the production team of the successful program.

The network also developed Corriente Cultural and En Foco, which highlighted the cultural and artistic achievements of Latinos in the US. Also, through Dialogo and Destination Casa Blanca, HITN has covered every US presidential election cycle since 2004. While providing this coverage, HITN also focused on the impact of each election, on Latinos living in the US.

External videos
- HITN video clip and multi-channel programming page

In 2017, HITN was nominated for three Emmy Awards in the arts, community, and public service categories. In the arts category, HITN TV was nominated for the production Arte Desde 3 Perspectivas en un Mismo Idioma. In the community/public service categories, the network was singled out for the PSAs Lo Que Realmente Importa and Nuestro Voto, Nuestra Voz.

In 2018, HITN partnered with Brooklyn County District Attorney to create and launch a new anti-cyber bullying program.

== Edye ==
In 2019, HITN launched the children's streaming service Edye.

== Viewership and growth ==
As of 2012, HITN delivered programming to over 40% of US households, through both satellite and cable TV channels.

As of 2017, HITN reached over 44 million homes in the US and Puerto Rico.

During the tenure of HITN President and CEO Mike Nieves, 10 million more homes were added in two years (2016–17).

HITN expanded its headquarters by moving to the Brooklyn Navy Yard. The new facility has 46,000 square feet, and a 3,000 square foot enclosed studio on the building's roof.

== Educational broadband spectrum ==
As the largest holder of Educational Broadband Spectrum (EBS) in the US and Puerto Rico HITN focuses on creating wireless broadband educational networks, and developing media platforms for their educational programming.

Most of the EBS Spectrum held by HITN is leased to companies such as Clearwire/Sprint Nextel. In 2012, HITN partnered with Connect to Compete (C2C) to promote broadband adoption, distance learning, and digital literacy in disadvantaged communities.

== Project LAMP ==
HITN was a participant in Project LAMP (Learning Apps Media Partnership), a children's educational trans-media initiative.

LAMP is a component of the U.S. Department of Education's "Ready To Learn" program, which is designed to help close the achievement gap of low-income young people, by creating multi-platform digital media-based programs for children aged three to eight.

== See also ==
- PBS
- Preschoolers
- Kindergarten
- Distance learning
- Apps
