= Baroque Revival architecture =

Architectural movement

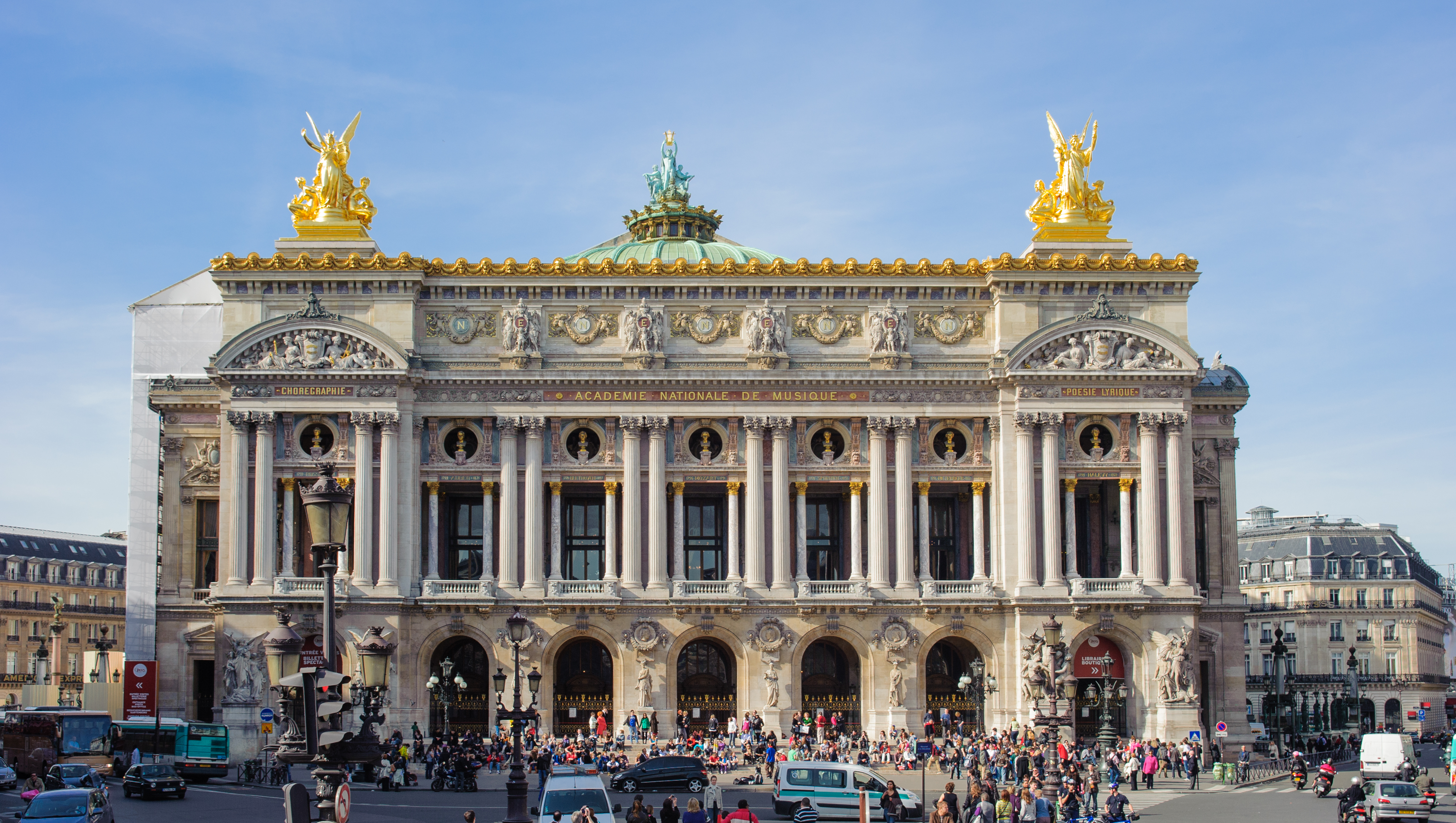
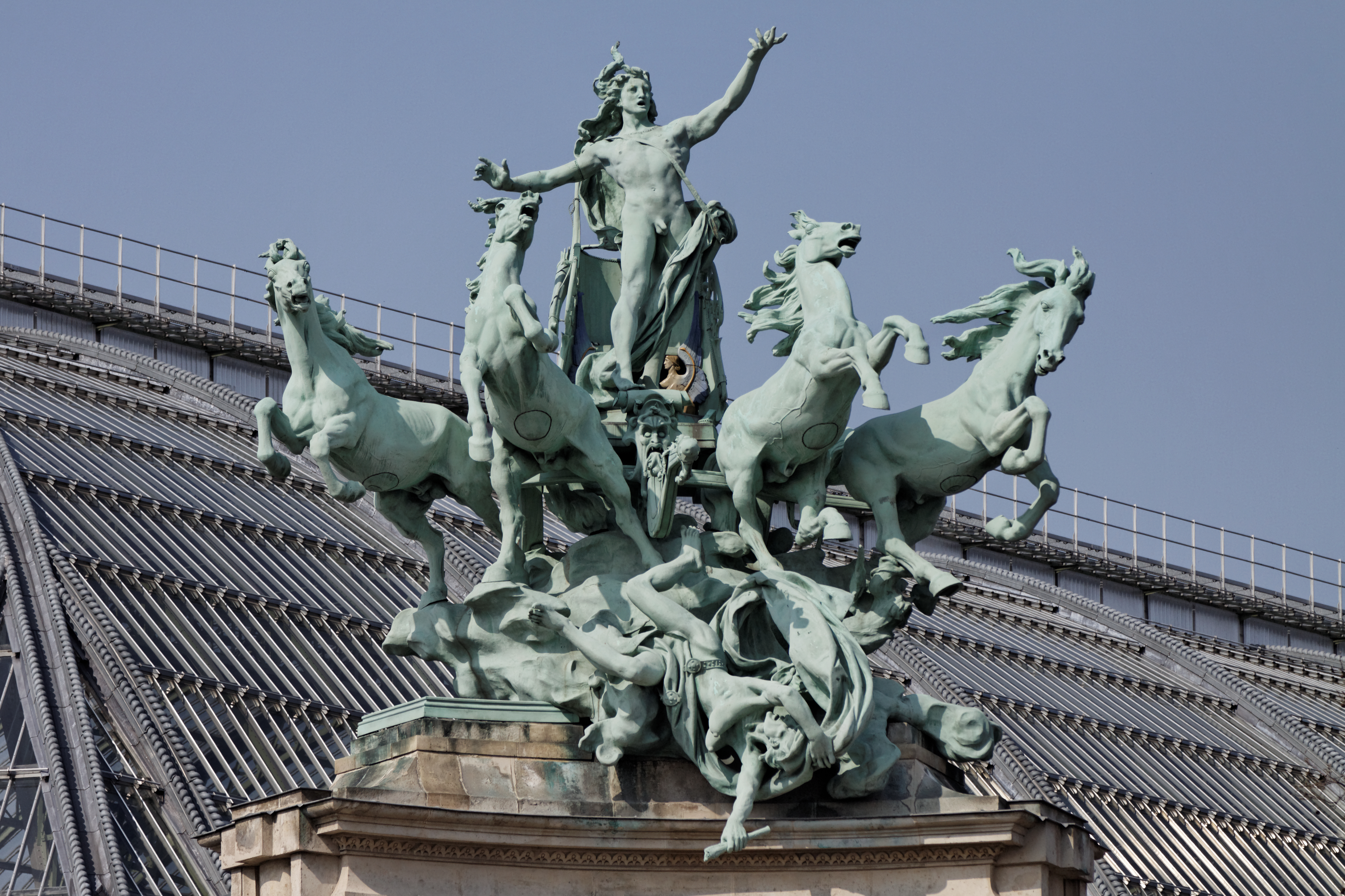
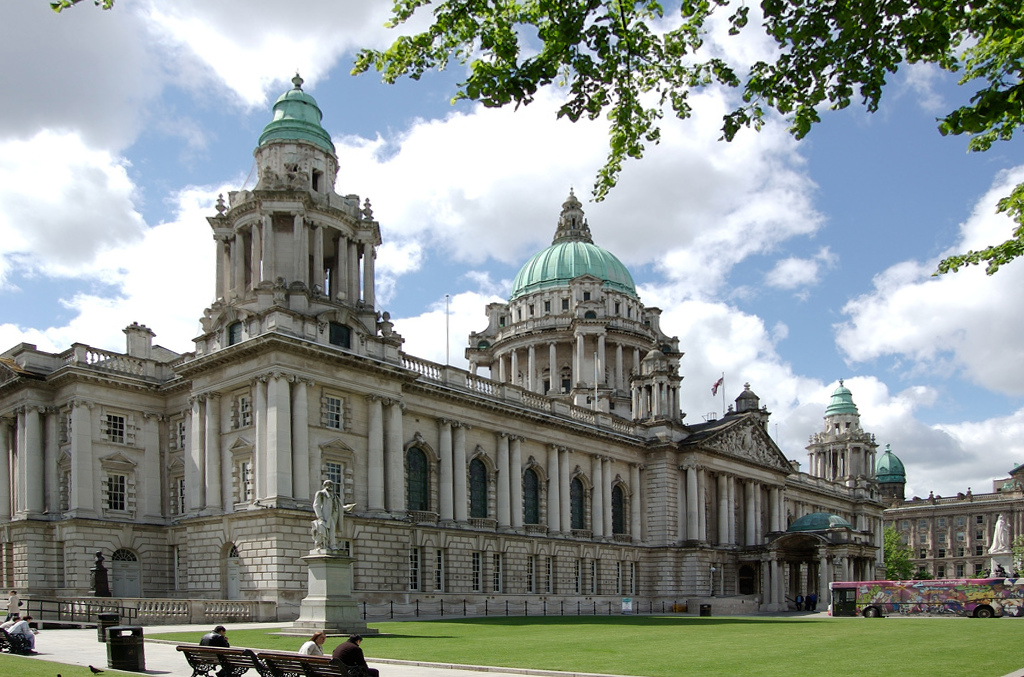
- Top: Palais Garnier (Paris), 1860–1875, by Charles Garnier; Second: Quadriga on the Grand Palais (Paris), 1898–1901, by Georges Récipon; Bottom: Belfast City Hall, 1898–1906, by Sir Brumwell Thomas.

The Baroque Revival, also known as Neo-Baroque (or Second Empire architecture in France and Wilhelminism in Germany), was an architectural style of the late 19th and early 20th centuries. The term is used to describe architecture and architectural sculptures which display important aspects of Baroque style, but are not of the original Baroque period. Elements of the Baroque architectural tradition were an essential part of the curriculum of the École des Beaux-Arts in Paris, the pre-eminent school of architecture in the second half of the 19th century, and are integral to the Beaux-Arts architecture it engendered both in France and abroad. An ebullient sense of European imperialism encouraged an official architecture to reflect it in Britain and France, and in Germany and Italy the Baroque Revival expressed pride in the new power of the unified state.

== Notable examples ==
- Akasaka Palace (1899–1909), Tokyo, Japan
- Alferaki Palace (1848), Taganrog, Russia
- Ashton Memorial (1907–1909), Lancaster, England
- Belfast City Hall (1898–1906), Belfast, Northern Ireland
- Bode Museum (1904), Berlin, Germany
- British Columbia Parliament Buildings (1893–1897), Victoria, British Columbia, Canada
- Building of the Baku City Executive Power (1900~1904), Baku, Azerbaijan
- Burgtheater (1888), Vienna, Austria
- Cardiff City Hall (1897–1906), Cardiff, Wales
- Cathedral of Salta (1882), Salta, Argentina
- Christiansborg Palace (1907–1928), Copenhagen, Denmark
- Church of St. Ignatius Loyola (1895–1900), New York City, United States
- Church of Saints Peter and Paul (1932–1939), Athlone, Ireland
- Cluj-Napoca National Theatre (1904–1906), Cluj-Napoca, Romania
- Dolmabahçe Palace (1843–1856), Istanbul, Turkey
- Durban City Hall, Durban, South Africa
- The Elms Mansion (1899–1901), Newport, Rhode Island, United States
- Freedom Square 1 Tenement (1896–1898), Bydgoszcz, Poland
- Gran Teatro de La Habana (1908–1915), Havana, Cuba
- House of the National Assembly of Serbia (1907–1936), Belgrade, Serbia
- Thomas Jefferson Building, Library of Congress (1873–1897), Washington, D.C., United States
- Näsilinna (also known as the Milavida Palace) (1898), Tampere, Finland
- Royal Palace, Sofia, Bulgaria
- National Theatre (1899), Oslo, Norway
- Oceanographic Museum of Monaco (1910), Monaco
- Old Parliament Building (1930), Colombo, Sri Lanka
- Ortaköy Mosque (1854–1856), Istanbul, Turkey
- Palais Garnier (also known as the Paris Opera) (1861–1875), Paris, France
- Pomeranian Landowners Palace (1893–1895), Szczecin, Poland
- Port of Liverpool Building (1903–1907), Liverpool, England
- Reich Court building (1888–1895), Leipzig, Germany
- Rosecliff Mansion (1898–1902), Newport, Rhode Island, United States
- Royal Museum for Central Africa (1905–1909), Tervuren, Belgium
- Semperoper (1878), Dresden, Germany
- Sofia University rectorate (1924–1934), Sofia, Bulgaria
- St. Barbara's Church (1910), Brooklyn, New York, United States
- St. John Cantius Church (1893–1898), Chicago, United States
- Stefánia Palace (formerly named Park Club) (1893–1895), Budapest, Hungary
- Széchenyi thermal bath (1913), Budapest, Hungary
- Volkstheater (1889), Vienna, Austria
- Wenckheim Palace (1886–1889), Budapest, Hungary
- Zachęta National Gallery of Art (1898–1900), Warsaw, Poland

There are also number of post-modern buildings with a style that might be called "Baroque", for example the Dancing House in Prague by Vlado Milunić and Frank Gehry, who have described it as "new Baroque".

== Baroque Revival architects ==
- Ferdinand Fellner (1847–1916) and Hermann Helmer (1849–1919)
- Arthur Meinig (1853–1904)
- Sir Edwin Lutyens (1869–1944)
- Members of the Armenian Balyan family (19th century)
- Charles Garnier (1825–1898)

== Gallery ==
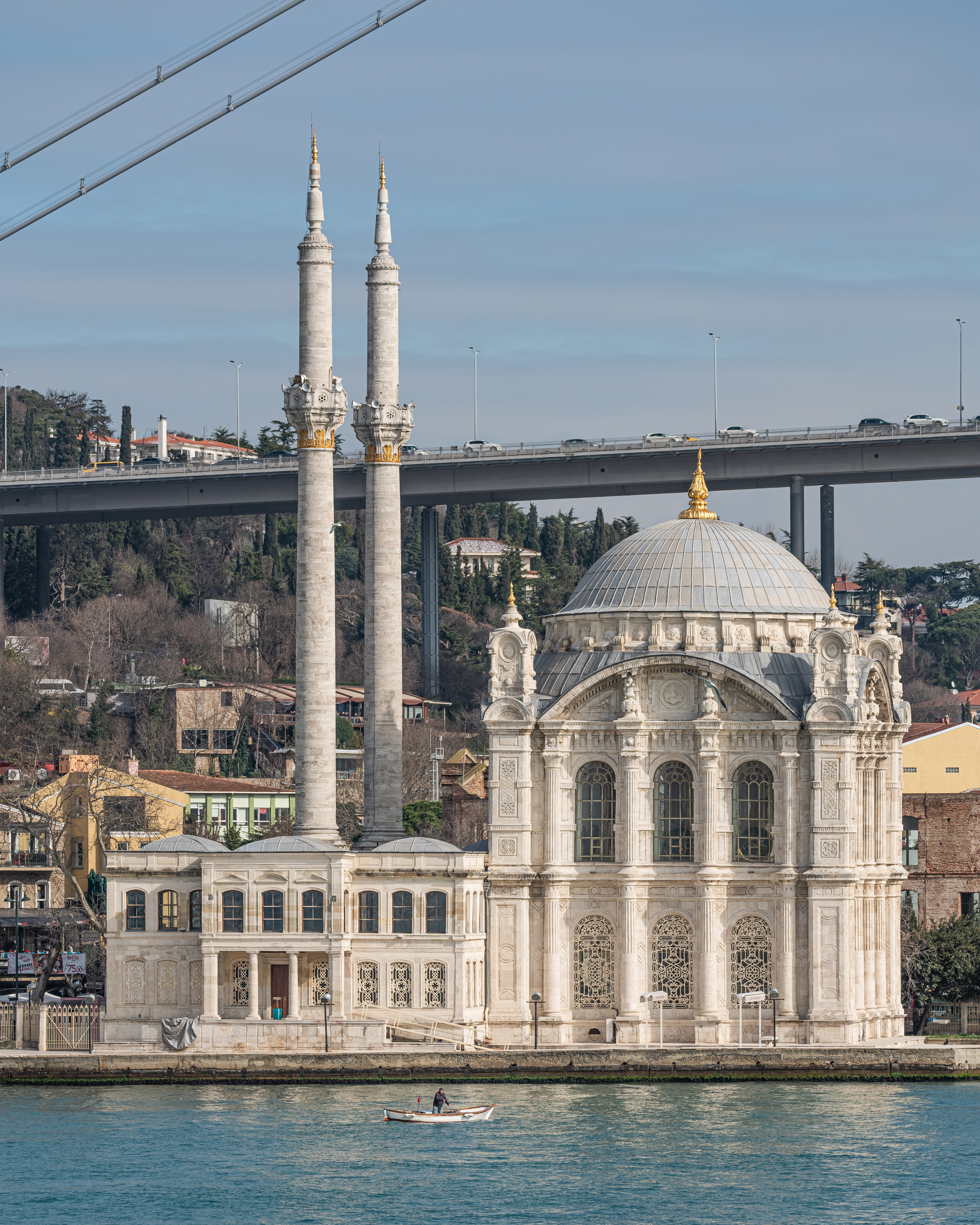
Ortaköy Mosque in Istanbul, Turkey, 1854–1856

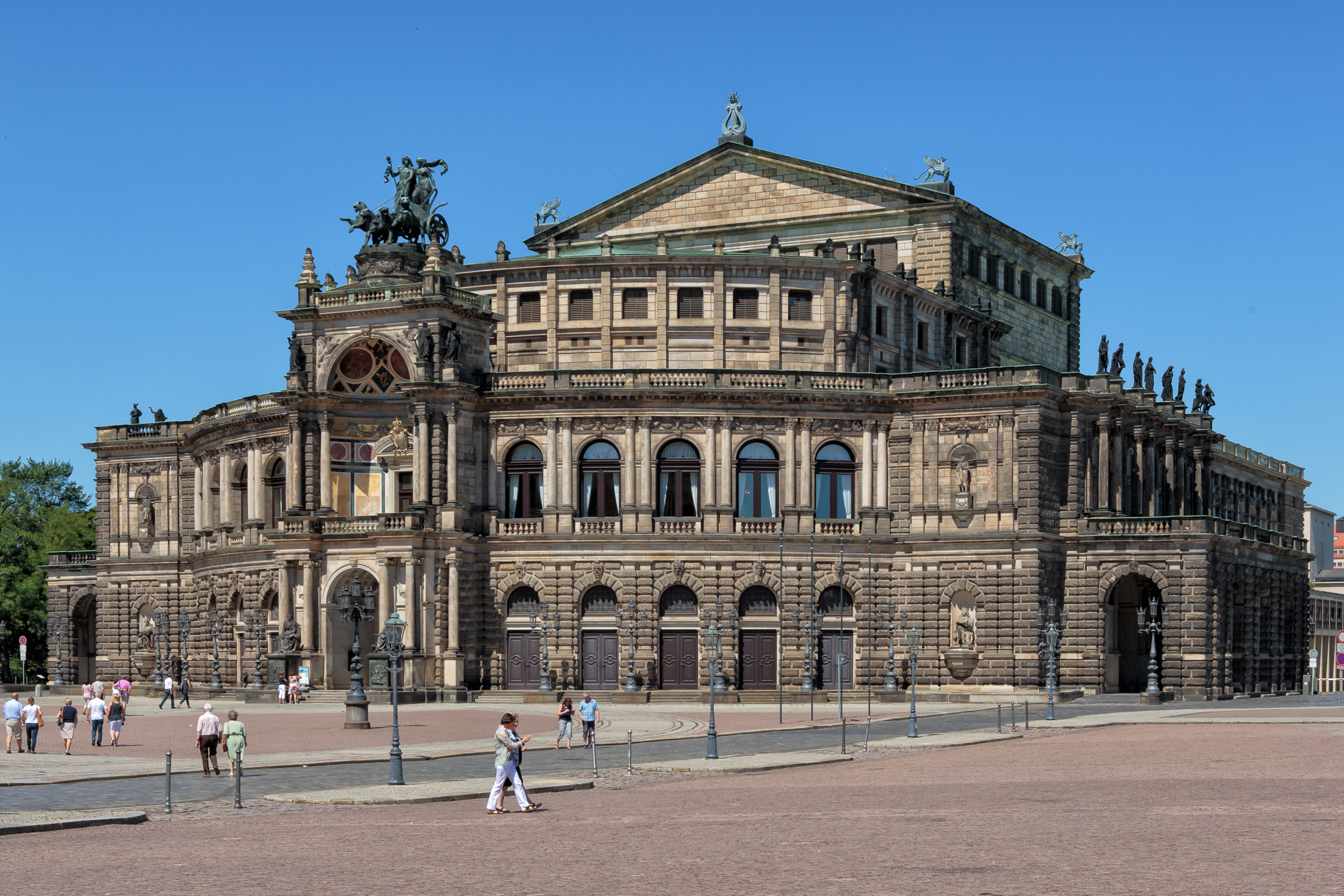
Semperoper in Dresden, Germany, 1878

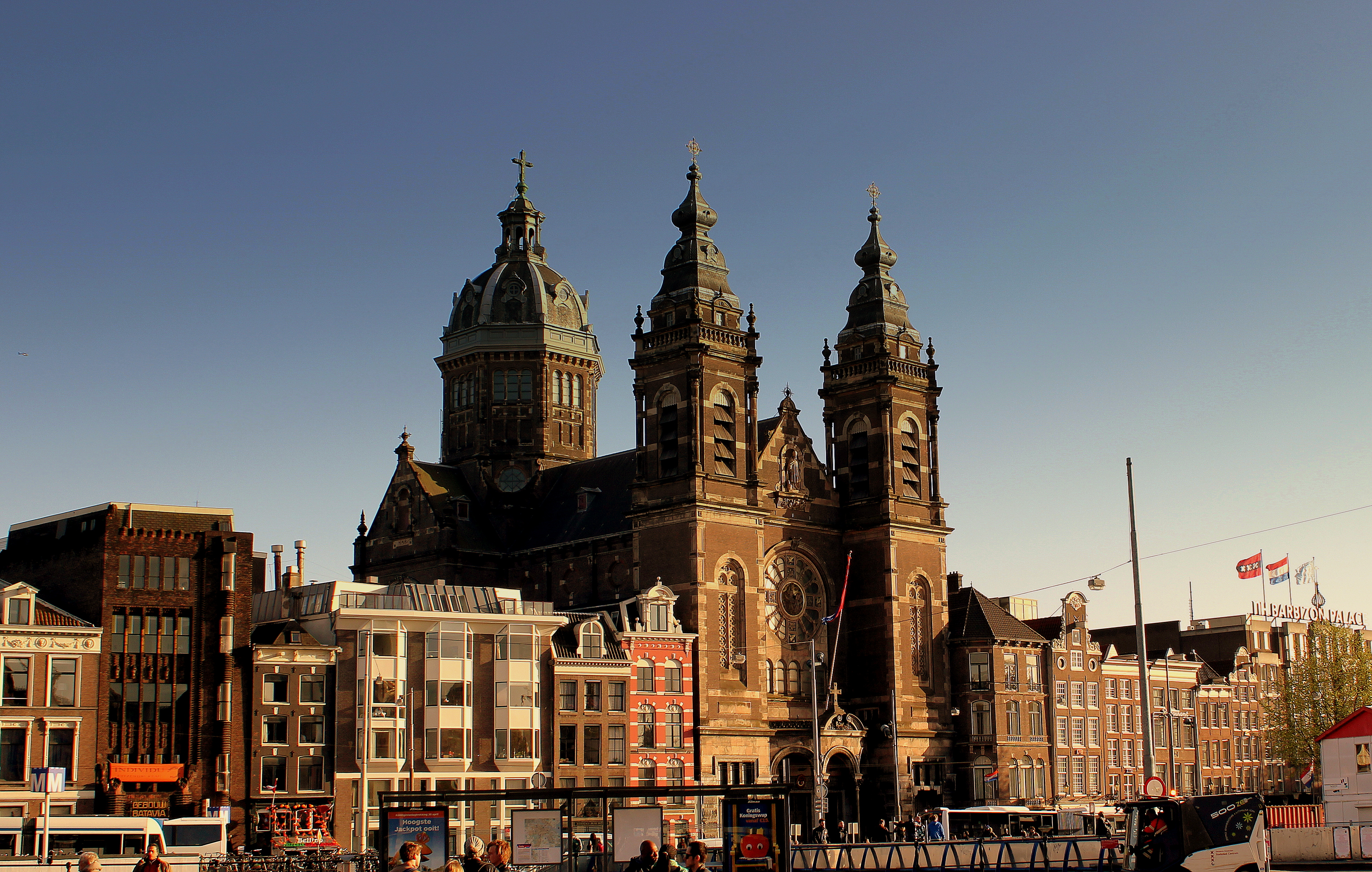
Basilica of St. Nicholas in Amsterdam, Netherlands, 1887

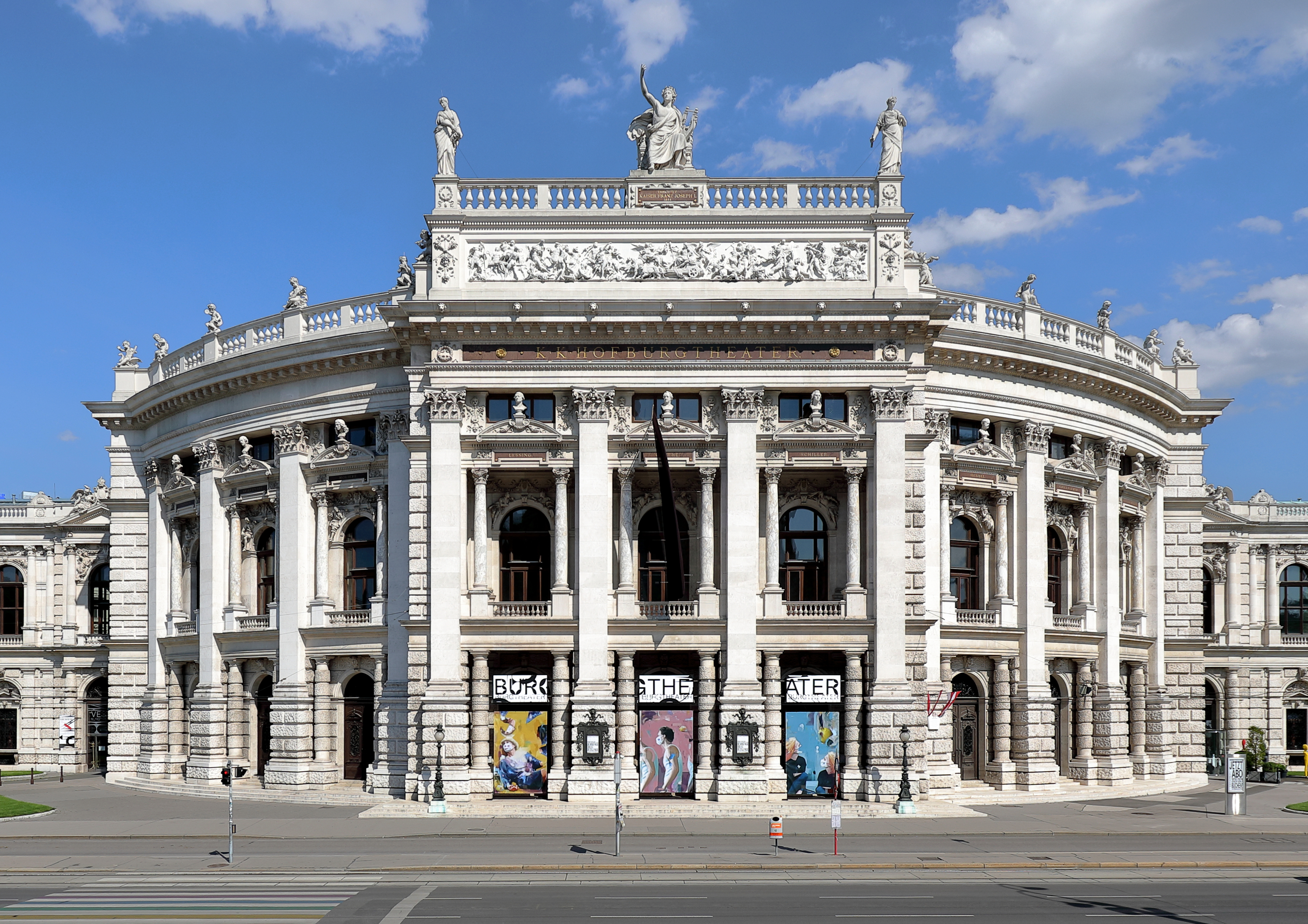
Burgtheater in Vienna, Austria, 1888

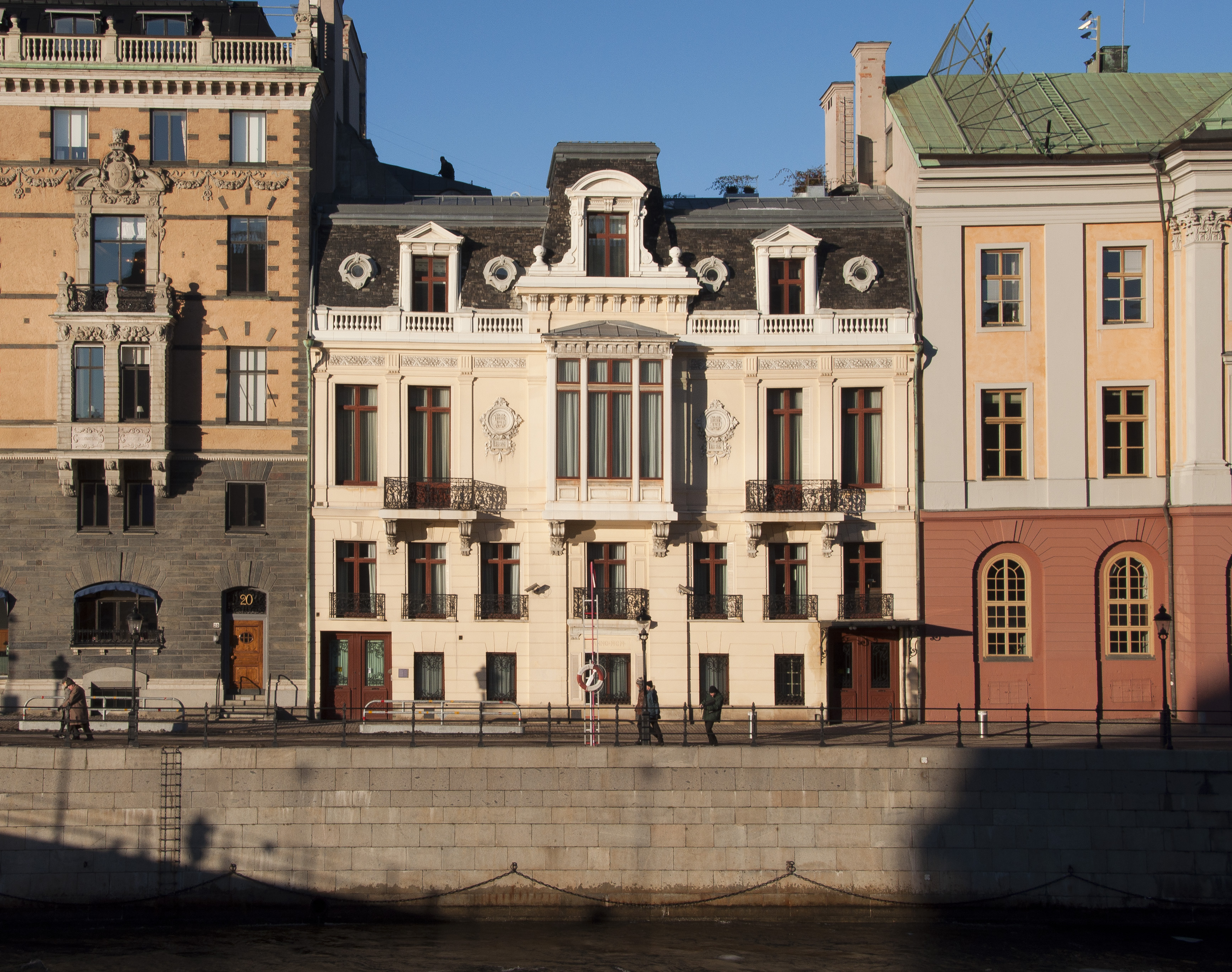
Sager House in Stockholm, Sweden, 1893

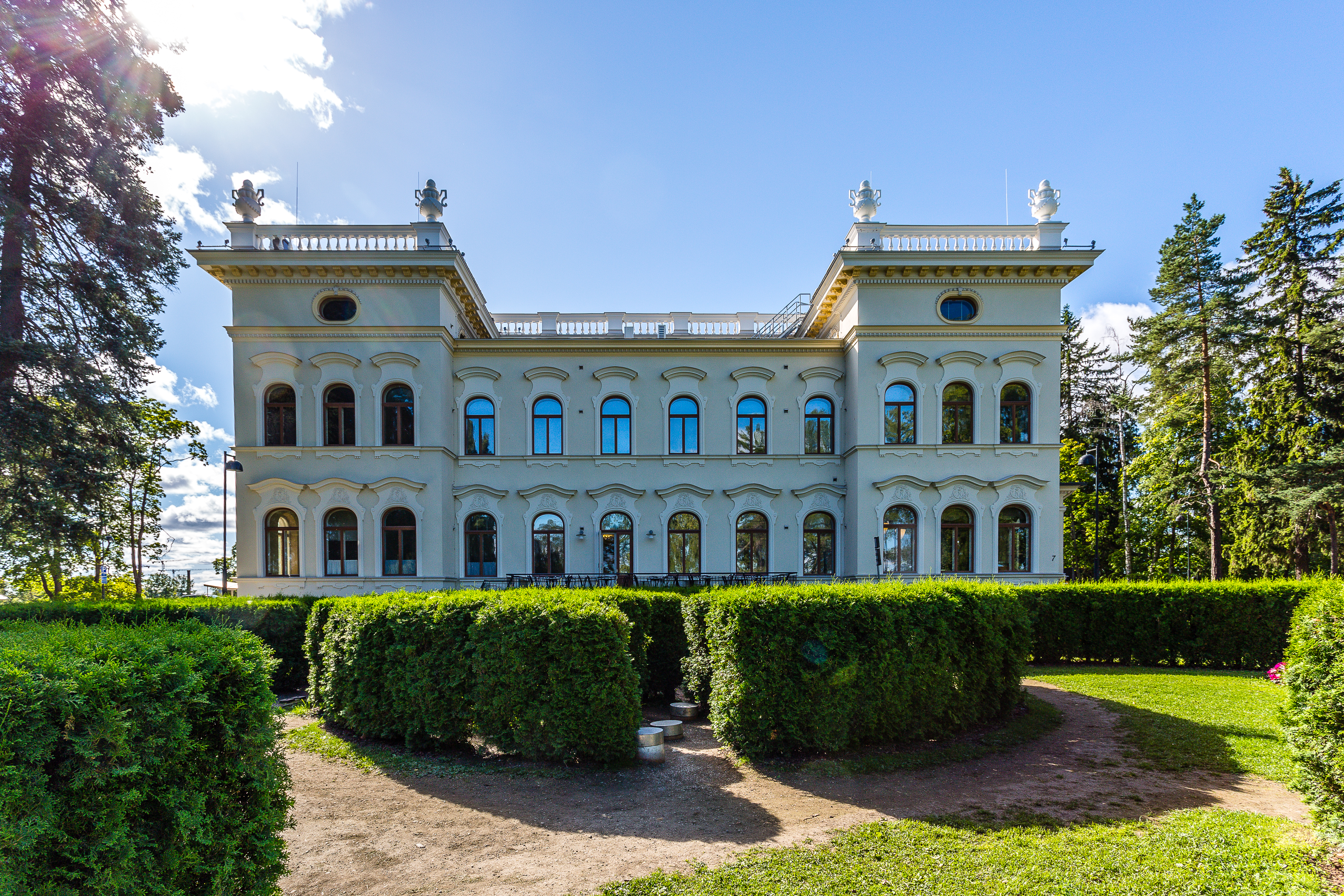
Milavida Palace in Tampere, Finland, 1898

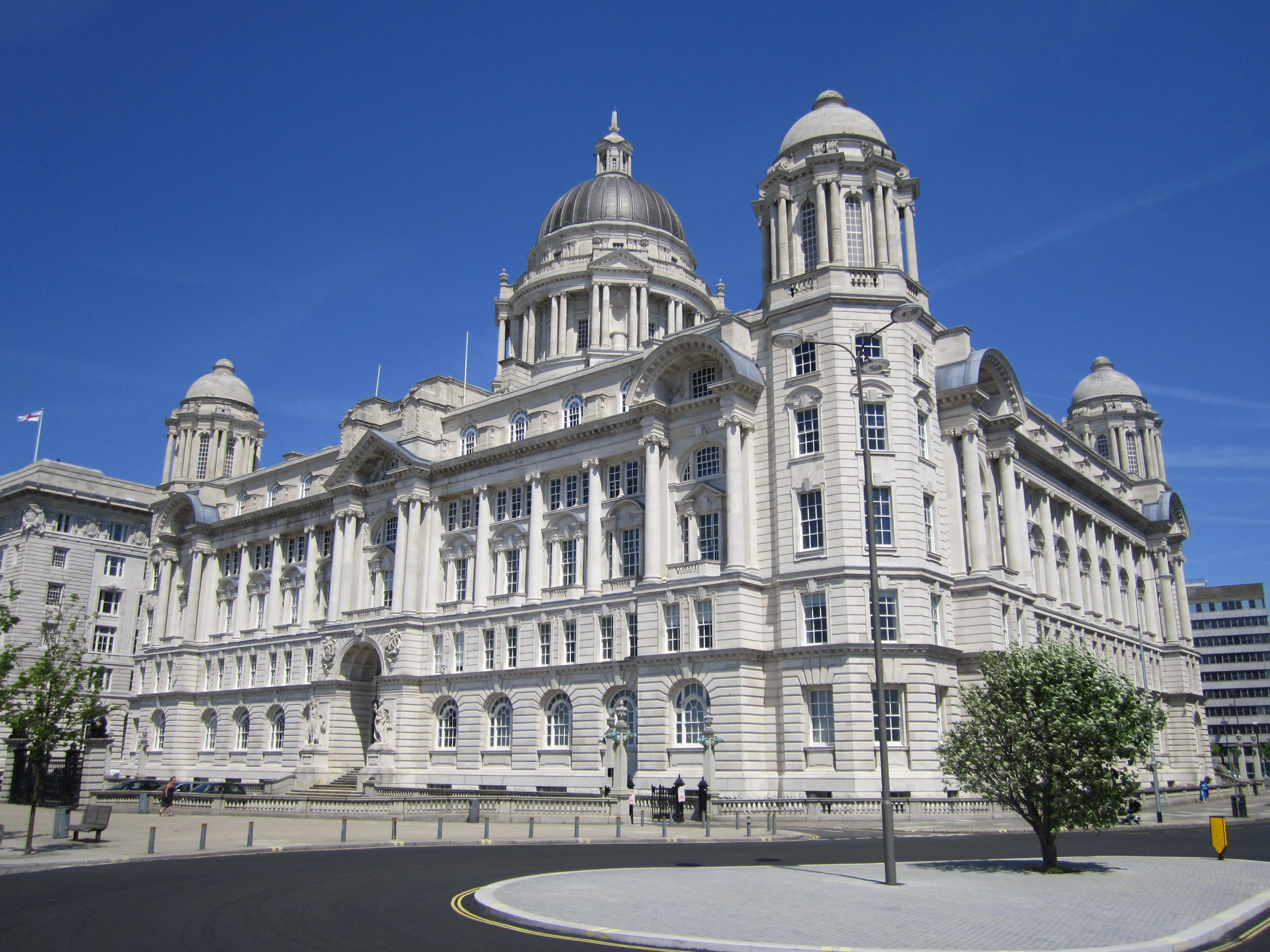
Port of Liverpool Building, Liverpool, England, 1903–1907

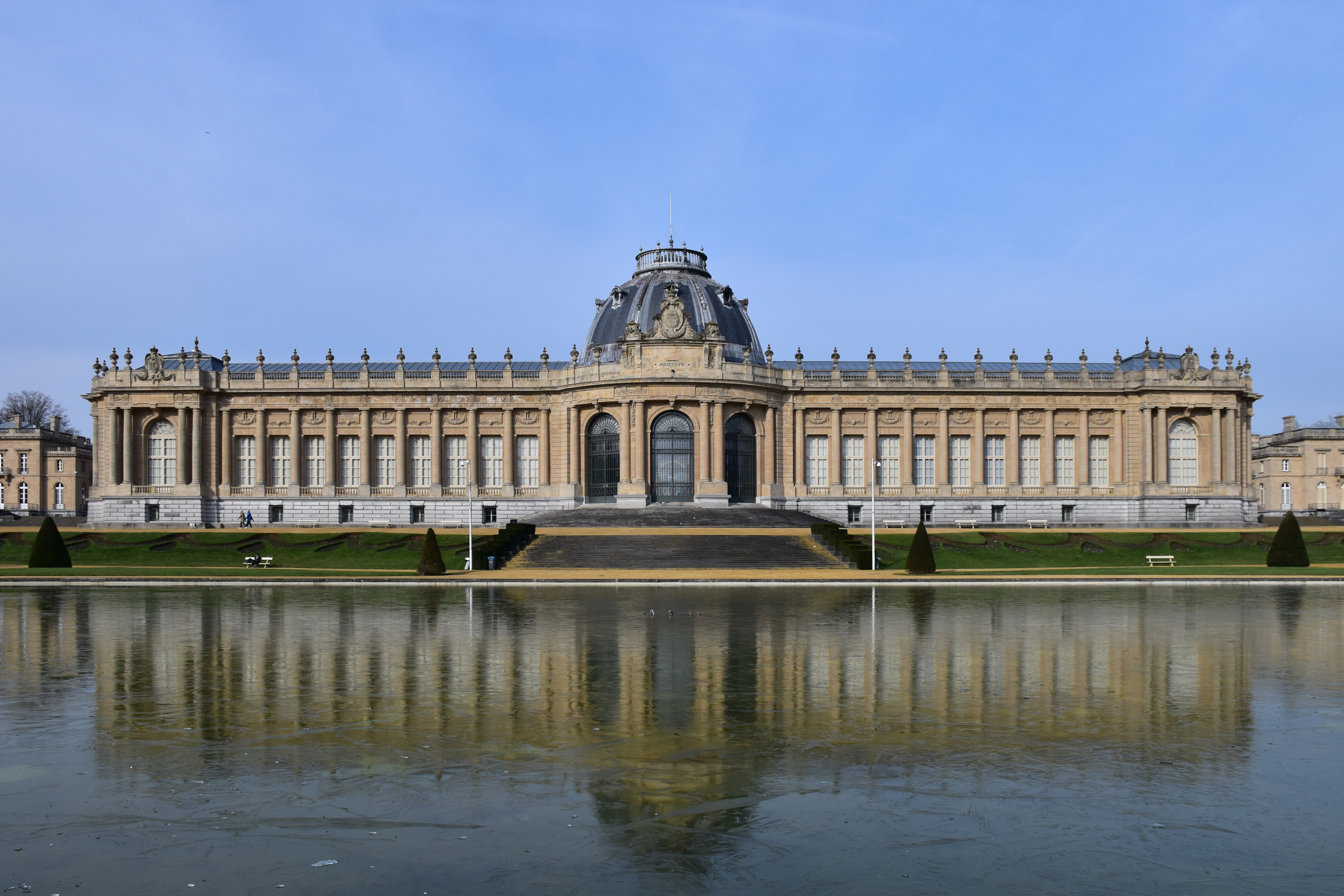
Royal Museum for Central Africa in Tervuren, Belgium, 1905–1909

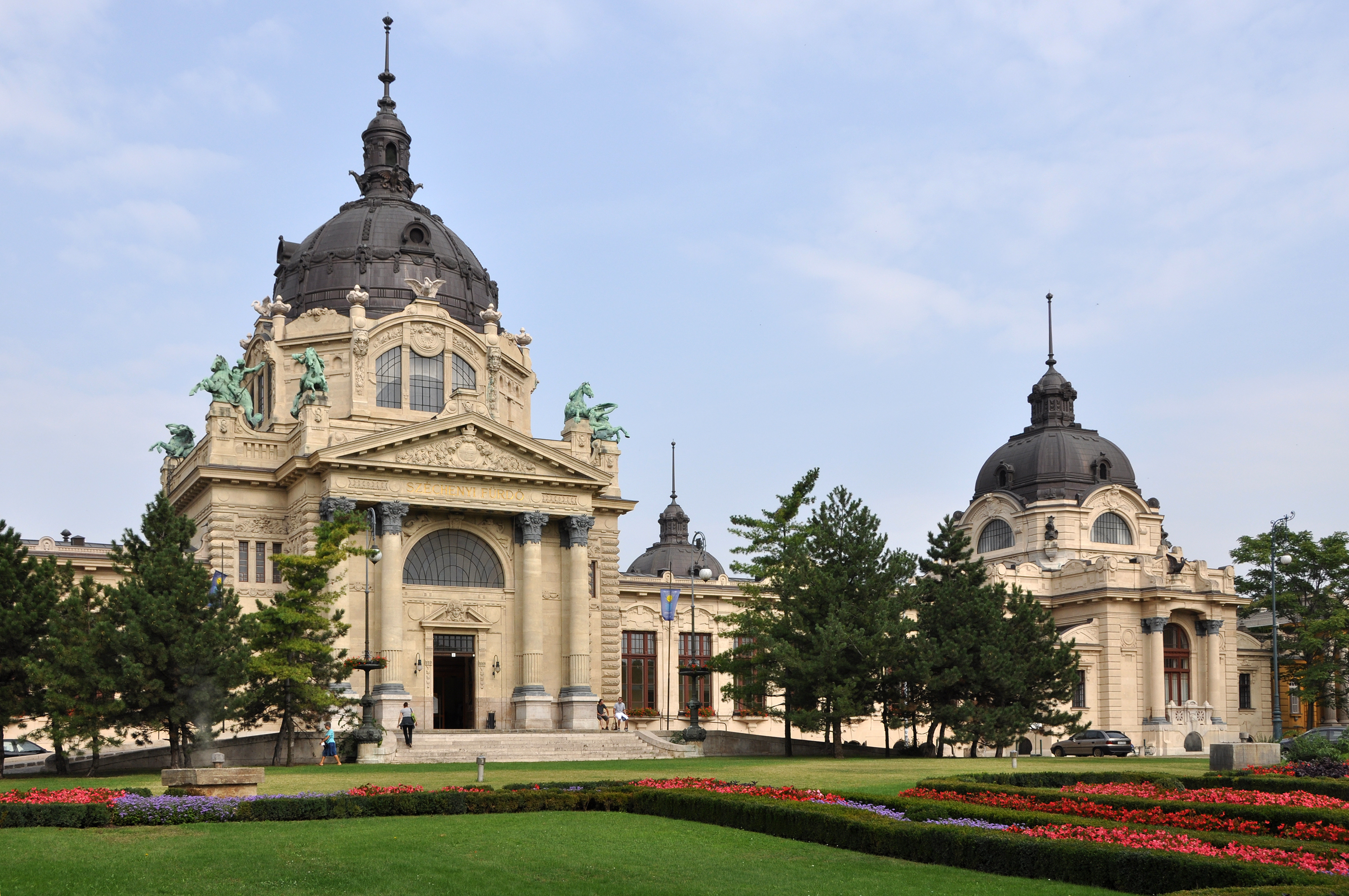
Széchenyi Medicinal Bath in Budapest, Hungary, 1913

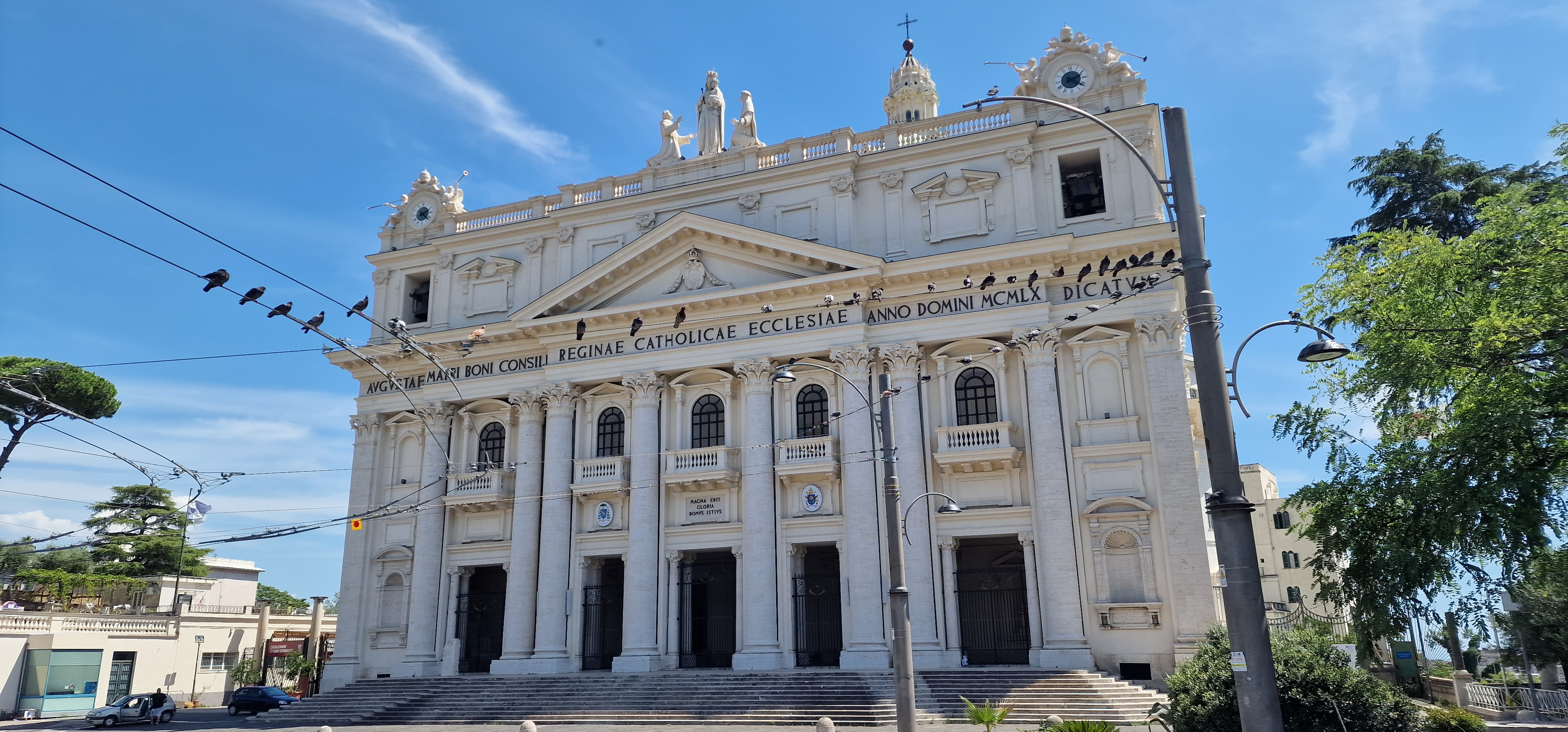
Madre del Buon Consiglio in Naples, Italy, 1920–1960

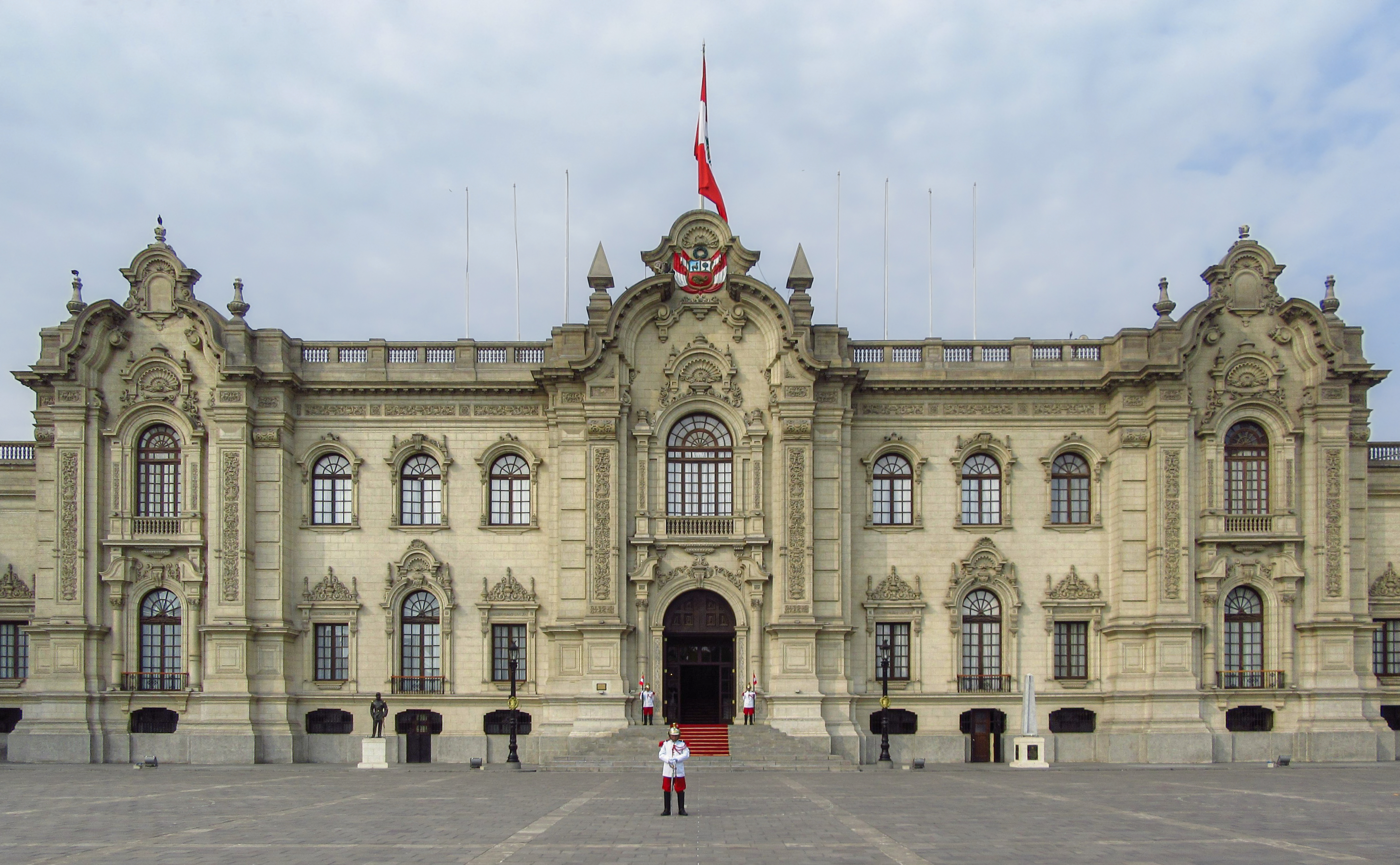
Government Palace in Lima, Peru, 1938

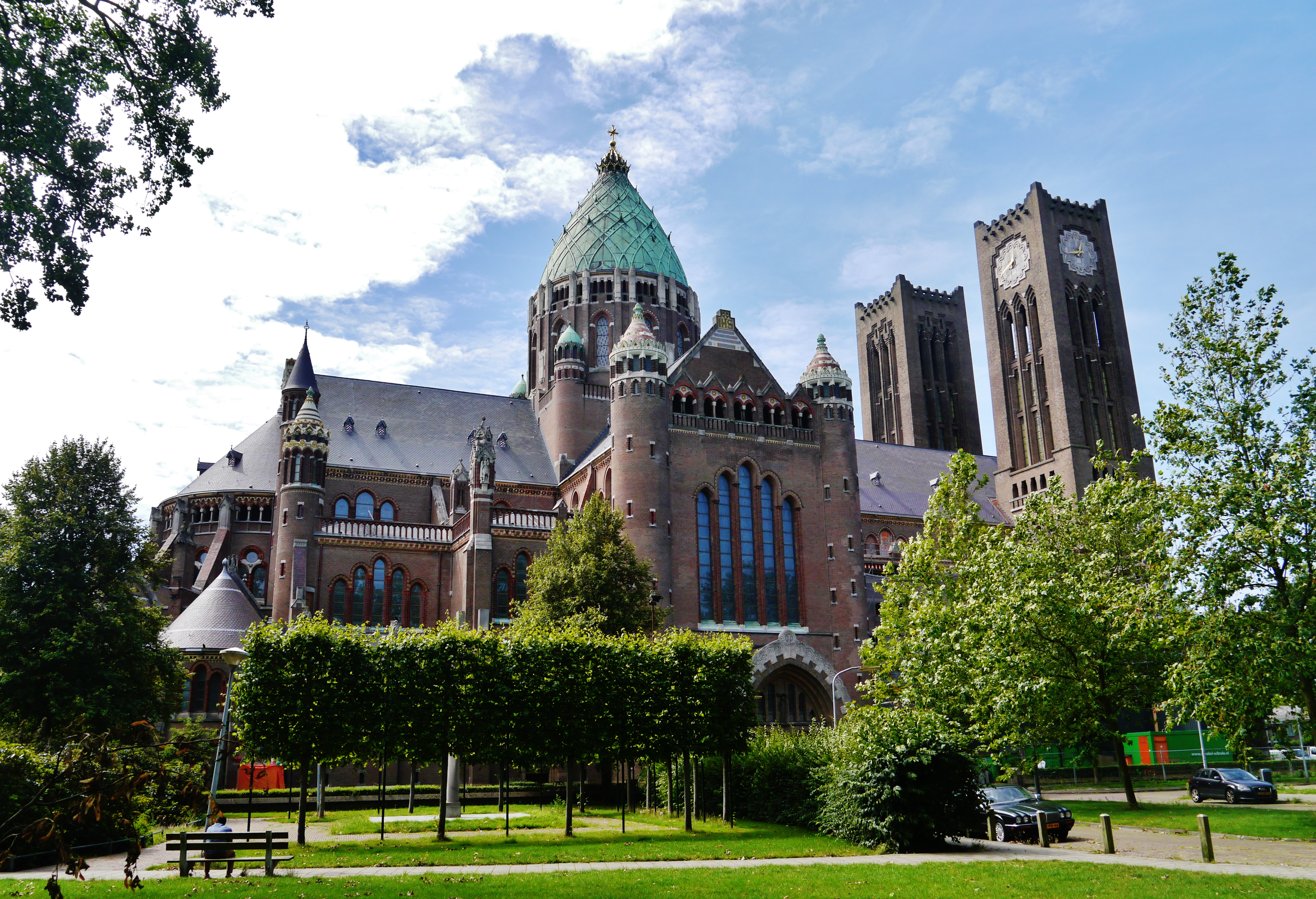
Cathedral of St Bavo, Haarlem in Haarlem, The Netherlands, 1898

== See also ==
- Edwardian Baroque architecture – Style of world architecture
- List of Baroque architecture
- List of Baroque residences
- Second Empire architecture
- Qajaresque Neo-Baroque architecture
- Wilhelminism – Period between 1888 and 1918 in the history of German Empire
