= Ritchie Torres =

American politician (born 1988)

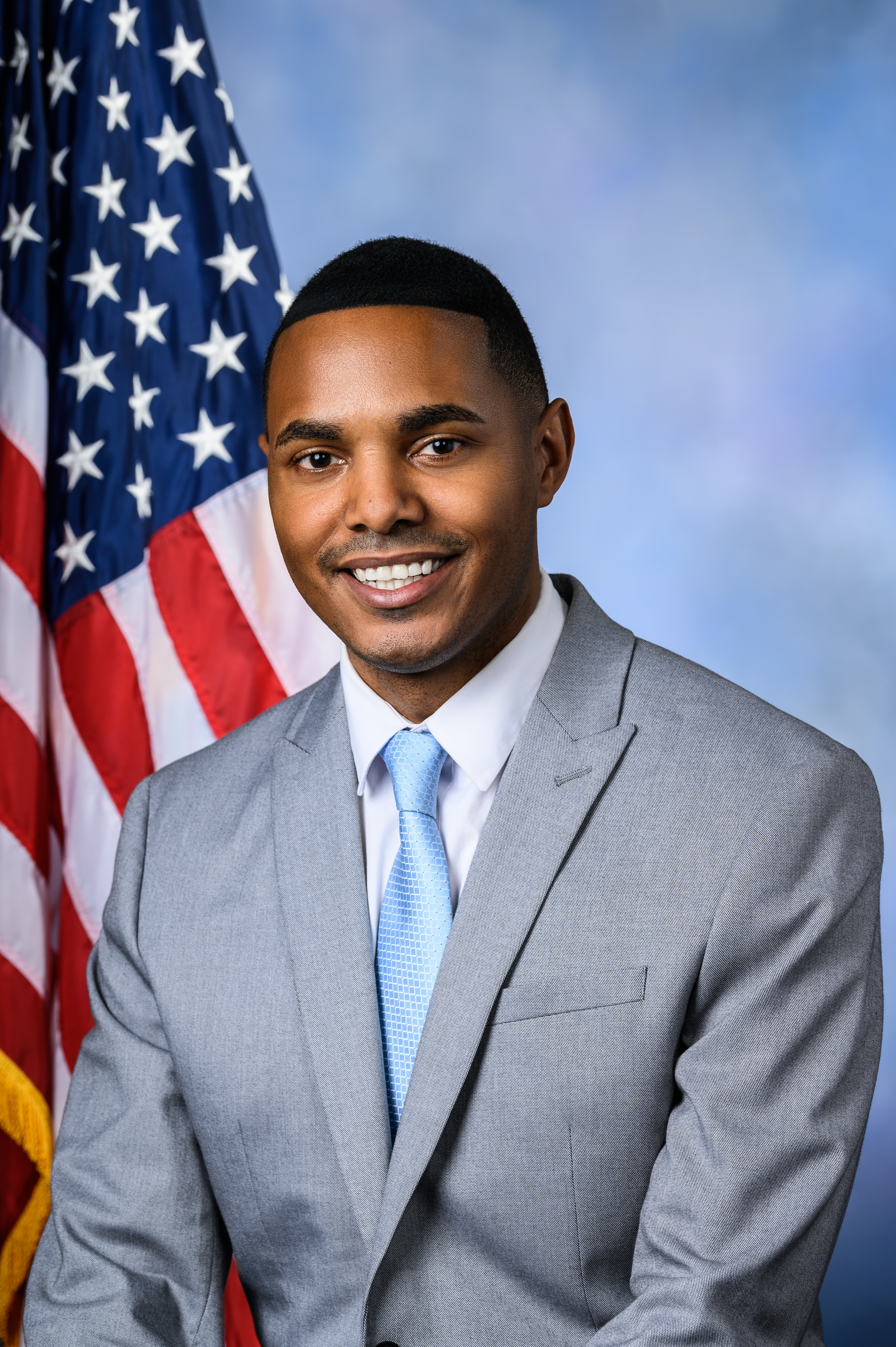
- Official portrait, 2020

Member of the U.S. House of Representatives from New York's 15th district
- Incumbent
- Assumed office January 3, 2021
- Preceded by: José E. Serrano

Member of the New York City Council from the 15th district
- In office January 1, 2014 – December 31, 2020
- Preceded by: Joel Rivera
- Succeeded by: Oswald Feliz

Personal details
- Born: Ritchie John Torres; March 12, 1988 (age 38) New York City, New York, U.S.
- Party: Democratic
- Education: New York University (attended)
- Website: House website Campaign website
- Torres's voice Torres on health among Black American communities. Recorded March 7, 2022

Ritchie John Torres (born March 12, 1988) is an American politician serving as the U.S. representative for New York's 15th congressional district since 2021. A member of the Democratic Party, he previously served on the New York City Council from 2014 to 2020.

Torres served as the New York City Council member for the 15th district from 2014 to 2020. Torres chaired the Committee on Public Housing and was a deputy majority leader. As chair of the Oversight and Investigations Committee, he focused on predatory lending associated with taxi medallion procurement and the city's Third Party Transfer Program.

In July 2019, Torres announced his bid for New York's 15th congressional district to succeed Representative José E. Serrano. The district is one of the most Democratic-leaning congressional districts in the country. Torres won the November 2020 general election and assumed office on January 3, 2021. This made Mondaire Jones and him the first openly gay Black men elected to Congress. It also made Torres the first openly gay Afro-Latino elected to Congress. Torres served as one of nine co-chairs of the Congressional Equality Caucus (previously known as Congressional LGBTQ+ Caucus) and as one of the co-chairs of the Congressional Albanian Issues Caucus in the 117th United States Congress.

Torres is known for his pro-Israel advocacy and has faced criticism from progressives opposed to Israel's conduct in the Gaza war.

== Early life and education ==
Ritchie Torres was born on March 12, 1988, in the Bronx. His father is Puerto Rican, while his mother is a native New Yorker who was born in the Bronx to Puerto Rican parents. Torres was raised Catholic.

Torres was raised by his mother in Throggs Neck Houses, a public housing project in the Throggs Neck neighborhood of the East Bronx, where he was frequently hospitalized for asthma as a result of the mold in their apartment. Of growing up economically disadvantaged in "slum conditions", Torres has said, "I was raised by a single mother who had to raise three children on minimum wage, and I lived in conditions of mold and vermin, lead and leaks." His mother raised him, his twin brother, and their sister. Torres was upset that the $269 million city-subsidized Trump Golf Links was built "across the street" in Ferry Point Park when those city funds could instead have been used to provide housing for New Yorkers in need. Torres has said that the construction of the Trump Golf Links helped him understand that he had to fight for struggling New Yorkers like himself. In junior high, Torres realized he was gay but did not come out, fearing homophobic violence.

Torres attended Herbert H. Lehman High School, served in the inaugural class of the Coro New York Exploring Leadership Program, and later worked as an intern in the offices of the mayor and the attorney general. He came out while a sophomore, during a schoolwide forum on marriage equality.

Torres enrolled at New York University, but dropped out at the beginning of his sophomore year, as he was suffering from severe depression. He struggled with suicidal thoughts based on his sexuality. As he recovered, Torres resumed working for council member James Vacca, eventually becoming Vacca's housing director. In that role, Torres conducted site inspections and documented conditions, ensuring housing issues were promptly and adequately addressed.

== New York City councilmember ==
At 25 years old, Torres ran to succeed Joel Rivera as the councilmember for the 15th district of the New York City Council. The district includes Allerton, Belmont, Bronx Park, Claremont Village, Crotona Park, Fordham, Mount Eden, Mount Hope, Norwood, Parkchester, Tremont, Van Nest, West Farms, and Williamsbridge in the Bronx.

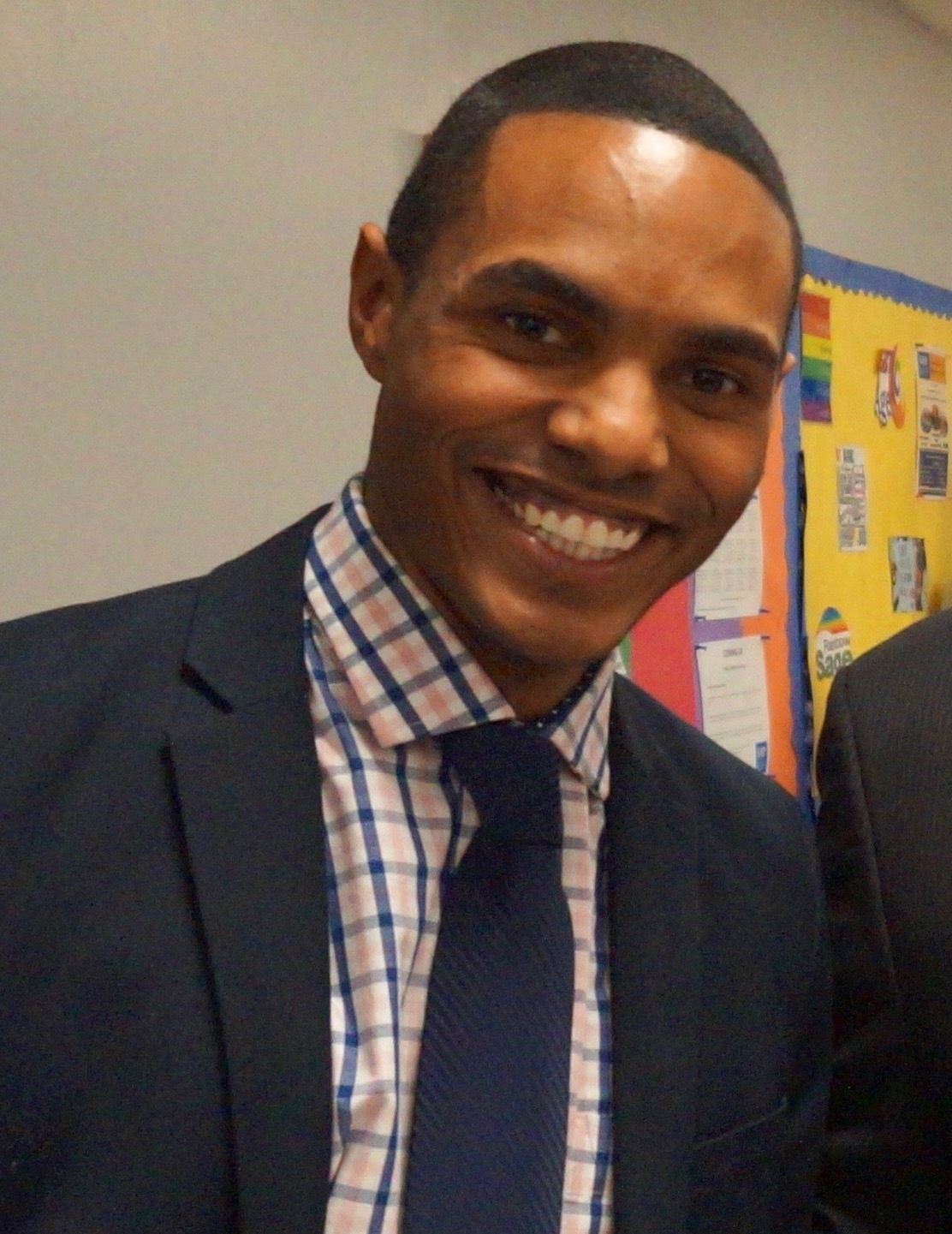
Ritchie Torres in 2015

When he won the Democratic nomination for the New York City Council, Torres became one of the first openly gay political candidates in the Bronx to secure a Democratic nomination, and upon victory in the general election, he became the first openly gay public official in the Bronx. In 2016, Torres was a delegate for the Bernie Sanders campaign. Torres also served as a deputy leader of the city council.

=== Public housing ===
Upon his election, Torres requested the chairmanship of the council's committee on public housing, tasked with overseeing the New York City Housing Authority (NYCHA); as of July 2019, it is the "nation's largest public housing system", which "provides housing to more than 400,000 low-income residents" in "176,000 apartments across 325 complexes". He made "the living conditions of the city's most underserved residents a signature priority". In this role, he helped secure $3 million for Concourse Village, Inc., a nearly 1,900-unit housing cooperative in the South Bronx. According to 2010 United States census data, the South Bronx is among the poorest districts in the nation. The cooperative is subsidized by the Mitchell-Lama Housing Program, offering "income-restricted rentals and below-market value buy-in for co-ops". He also secured nearly $1 million to renovate Dennis Lane Apartments, a Mitchell-Lama co-op in the heart of his district, and "played a crucial role in exposing the city's failures to address lead-paint contamination".

In August 2019, along with fellow council member Vanessa Gibson, Torres announced Right To Counsel 2.0, an expansion of legal aid to NYCHA tenants facing eviction. Since the original law was passed in 2017, providing legal help throughout the entire eviction case, the council has found that 84% of tenants were able to stay in their homes. The council members "say this will help keep families together and prevent displacement". Torres said, "NYCHA is one of the worst evictees in the city ... Not just one of the worst landlords, but one of the worst evictors. In 2018 alone, 838 families lost their homes in the hands of the NYCHA."

=== Combating gig worker tip theft ===
In April 2019, Torres worked on legislation aimed to compel companies that employ gig workers to be transparent about whether the workers' tips are diverted to pay a base salary. Mobile app delivery companies, like DoorDash—which has freelance workers pickup and deliver meals from restaurants—Amazon's Prime Now, and Instacart, usually allow customers to add a gratuity, but the companies were counting the tips toward regular payment. Torres characterized the practice as exploiting "an underclass of independent contractors", and hopes the city council can ban the practice altogether. Vox noted the gig economy requires regulation for the estimated 57 million workers (in the U.S.) who have little protection, and few if any benefits. Torres's bill would compel these companies to be transparent about the practice "by explicitly stating it in their terms of service or by sending a notification as a transaction is being approved".

=== Taxi medallion predatory loans ===
As chair of the oversight and investigations committee, newly empowered in January 2018 by city council speaker Corey Johnson, Torres said he had documentation that as early as 2010 the Bloomberg administration was "aware that medallion prices could crumple", a year before ridesharing pioneer Uber started its service in the city. Medallion prices dropped considerably in 2014, likely due to competition from ride-share companies. Medallion owners sued the city and Uber in November 2015. By 2017, 60,000 ride-share vehicles outnumbered medallion vehicles by almost 4 to 1, and many medallion owners faced the prospect of bankruptcy or severe debt because of the low medallion prices, which few were willing to pay. Torres said the "medallion market collapse is a cautionary tale" and "one of the greatest government scandals in the history of New York City".

In July 2019, the city council considered how to address the city's taxicab industry with the National Taxi Workers' Alliance's concerns that the NYC Taxi and Limousine Commission knowingly sold medallions at inflated prices, bringing in $1 billion in revenue to the city government, while saddling "thousands of drivers with impossible debt loads", leading to suicides.

=== Cashless businesses ===
In July 2019, Torres proposed legislation to address the movement in New York toward cashless business practices at stores and restaurants. He did so to preserve access for those who rely on cash for their purchases. The businesses accept only bank cards and e-commerce payments rather than hard currency, in part for higher efficiency, possibly streamlining both cashiering, and accounting; and for security reasons, as having cash risks robbery. According to the Federal Deposit Insurance Corporation, in 2017, 16.9% of African-American households "and 14% of Latino households did not have a bank account"; 6.5% of all households did not have a bank account; and 18.7% with accounts also used non-insured institutions for financial transactions. In New York City, 12% did not have bank accounts in 2013, including "domestic violence survivors who don't wish to be traced and undocumented immigrants, as some of those who may face significant challenges when opening bank accounts." They instead often use payday loans and check-cashing facilities. Torres's proposal would fine noncompliant businesses, while allowing them to refuse currency higher than $20 bills. It also prohibits charging more for using cash.

=== Third-Party Transfer program ===
In July 2019, Torres, as chair of the oversight and investigation committee, and Robert Cornegy, chair of the committees on housing and buildings, released a report from the joint committee that conducted a city council forensic investigation into the city's Third-Party Transfer (TPT) program. The TPT was started in 1996 under Giuliani's administration to let the Department of Housing and Preservation (HPD) transfer "derelict, tax-delinquent buildings to nonprofits that could rehabilitate and manage them", ostensibly for working-class people, freeing the city from ownership, or responsibility for tenants. HPD followed a rule selecting "every other building in the same tax block with a lien—even for a few hundred dollars"—if even one was picked for TPT. Mayor Bill de Blasio's administration characterized the TPT as a tool for taking over "distressed properties" in "blighted" areas. The report, (Note: Taking Stock: A look Into The Third Party Transfer Program in Modern Day New York) however, holds that characterization is in tension with its findings, which implicate malfeasance by both NYC's HPD and the Department of Finance (DOF), detailing how the agencies were "targeting and taking of numerous black and brown owned properties, and thus stripping these communities of millions of dollars of generational wealth." According to Torres, "TPT is quite different from and far harsher than a typical foreclosure from the perspective of a property owner. If you are the target of a foreclosure, you get a share of the proceeds from the sale of your property. Under TPT, the city can completely strip you of all the equity in your property." The TPT process strips the minority owner of the property and its value, and mitigates the sweat equity and resources invested—all with no compensation.

=== LGBT advocacy ===
Torres helped open the first homeless shelter for LGBT youth in the Bronx. He also secured funds for senior centers to serve LGBT people in all five NYC boroughs.

On June 22, 2026, Torres appeared at the Lesbian, Gay, Bisexual, and Transgender Community Center of New York City to denounce the 2026 Republican nominee for Governor of New York Bruce Blakeman for his association with Donald Trump and the Make America Great Again movement. Deborah Glick, Christine C. Quinn, the President of The Stonewall Democratic Club of New York City John Wahlmeier, and Carl M. Wilson also spoke at this conference to criticize Bruce Blakeman's anti-LGBTQ+ alliances and stances.

=== Guns and gang violence ===
In August 2019, Torres announced the city council was awarding $36.2 million for gun violence prevention and reduction. He said shooting incidents in New York City were up from 413 in the first half of 2018 to 551 in the same period of 2019.

== U.S. House of Representatives ==
=== Elections ===
==== 2020 ====
Torres has stated that he is "intent on advancing politically", and has been floated as a future candidate for mayor of New York City. His "goal is to be a national champion for the urban poor".

In July 2019, Torres announced his candidacy for the U.S. House of Representatives for New York's 15th congressional district. In his announcement, Torres shared his history of depression. Torres said he was seeking the office to pursue "his legislative passions of overhauling public housing and focusing on the issues of concentrated poverty". The 15th congressional district is the nation's poorest in terms of median income. Torres said, "If you are on a mission to fight racially concentrated poverty ... then you have to be a policymaker on the national stage." He favors maximizing social housing in the nation, including the ending of land-use bans of apartments, which he says will result in the reduction of carbon emissions, as well as increase affordable housing. Torres came under criticism for his willingness to take real estate cash donations during his campaign.

Torres's main opponent as he started campaigning in the Democratic primary was Rubén Díaz Sr., a conservative Democrat and Pentecostal minister, who does not believe in, and openly stood in opposition to, same-sex marriage. Media outlets contextualized the contest between the two, noting their age difference, contrasting levels of experience, and Torres's open homosexuality versus Díaz's track record of anti-LGBT rhetoric. Torres said he saw Díaz as "temperamentally and ideologically indistinguishable" from Donald Trump. According to The New York Times, Díaz had "a decades-long history of making homophobic remarks"; LGBTQ Nation said his anti-LGBT rhetoric started in the early 1990s, right after his start in city politics, when he claimed the city's hosting the 1994 Gay Games "would spread AIDS and corrupt children". In February 2019, Díaz said that the City Council was "controlled by homosexuals"; in response, the council dissolved a subcommittee he chaired. As of July 2019, Torres had raised $500,000 and Díaz $80,000. Torres was endorsed by the LGBTQ+ Victory Fund and the Congressional Equality Caucus (Equality PAC).

The Democratic primary was held on June 23. Torres declared victory in the primary on July 22. As the seat for which he was running is one of the safest Democratic seats in the country, he was expected to win the general election, after which he would become one of the first openly gay black Congressmen in U.S. history, along with Mondaire Jones in the 17th district. On August 4, local election officials declared Torres the winner of the primary. This all but assured him of being the next congressman from this heavily Democratic, Latino-majority district. The 15th and its predecessors have been in Democratic hands for all but 11 months since 1927, the lone break in this tradition being American Labor Party member Leo Isacson from February 1948 to January 1949. It has been held by Latino congressmen since 1971.

==== 2024 ====
For the 2024 elections, Torres ran for reelection and successfully defeated Conservative Party candidate Gonzalo Duran, who was endorsed by the Republican Party. Duran, a U.S. Marine Corps Sergeant veteran of the Iraq War, serves as the CEO of a Devil Dog USA a nonprofit organization, the vice chairman of the Bronx Conservative Party and District Leader of the 79th Assembly District.

==== 2026 ====
2026 Democratic primary results by precinct Torres: 40–50%; 50–60%; 60–70%; 70–80%; 80–90%; 90–100%; Blake: 50–60%; Tie: 40–50%

In November 2025, former vice chair of the Democratic National Committee Michael Blake announced that he would challenge Torres in the 2026 Democratic primary for New York's 15th congressional district. Blake challenged Torres due to Torres' support of Israel. Torres won the primary with 72% of the vote.

=== Tenure ===
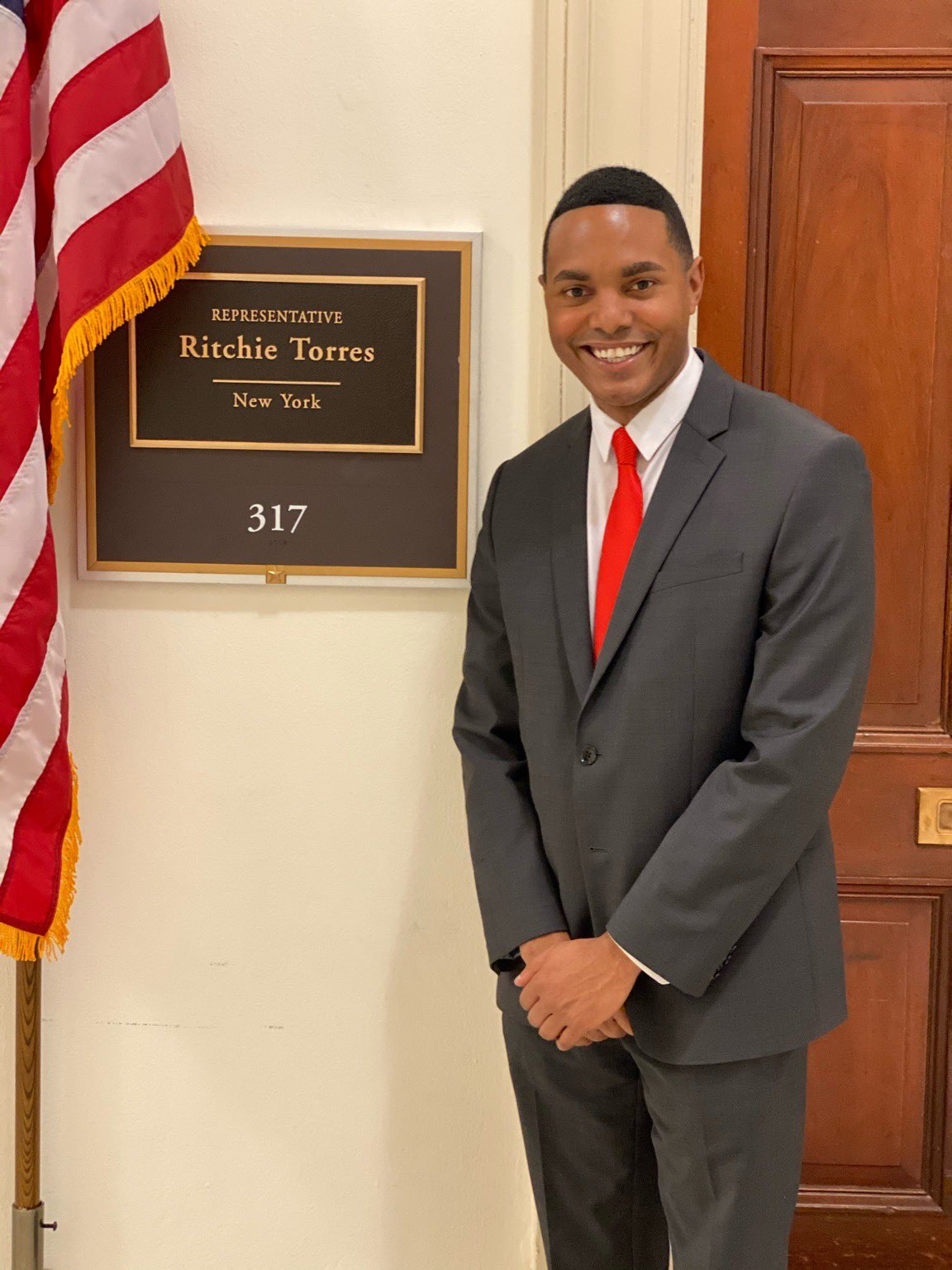
Torres outside his office

Torres took office on January 3, 2021. He represents the poorest congressional district in the United States. Upon his swearing-in, he became the first openly gay Afro-Latin American member of Congress.

On August 6, 2021, Torres introduced H.R. 4980, which would "ensure that any individual traveling on a flight that departs from or arrives to an airport inside the United States or a territory of the United States is fully vaccinated against COVID-19".

Torres voted with President Joe Biden's stated position 100% of the time in the 117th Congress, according to a FiveThirtyEight analysis.

Torres was among the 46 Democrats who voted against final passage of the Fiscal Responsibility Act of 2023 in the House. He said his vote was motivated by the new SNAP requirements included in the deal, which raised the work requirements from able-bodied adults under age 50 who do not live with any dependent children to adults under age 54, and the diversion of $20 billion in funding for the Internal Revenue Service.

Torres reintroduced the B.O.D.E.G.A. Act in the House of Representatives in 2025. If signed into law, the legislation would offer federal funds to bodegas to cover the cost of security equipment such as panic buttons and security cameras, as well as their installation.

=== Committee assignments ===
Current

- Committee on Financial Services
  - Subcommittee on Digital Assets, Financial Technology, and Artificial Intelligence
  - Subcommittee on Housing and Insurance
  - Subcommittee on National Security, Illicit Finance and International Financial Institutions

Former

- Committee on Homeland Security
- Select Committee on Strategic Competition between the United States and the Chinese Communist Party

=== Caucuses ===
- Congressional Progressive Caucus (2021–2024)
- Congressional Equality Caucus (co-chair)
- Black Maternal Health Caucus
- Congressional Black Caucus
- Congressional Hispanic Caucus
- Congressional Blockchain Caucus
- Congressional Ukraine Caucus
- Future Forum

== Political positions ==
In September 2025, Torres described feeling left behind by the Democratic Party. He has blamed what he calls the "far-left flank" of his party for causing Donald Trump's reelection and has deleted his left-wing posts and issues on his website. Since being elected, Torres has politically shifted to the center.

=== Environment ===
Torres has voiced support for a Green New Deal and was endorsed by the League of Conservation Voters in 2020. He suggested that public housing should be "a model for green and energy efficient buildings to help combat climate change while addressing its capital needs". Torres has called the Cross Bronx Expressway "a structure of environmental racism" and supports a plan to cover the highway with green space.

=== Elon Musk ===
Speaking about Elon Musk's falling out with Donald Trump, Torres said that "I'm a believer in redemption, and he is telling the truth about the" One Big Beautiful Bill Act after Musk feuded with Trump over the legislation. He also added that Musk has "done an enormous amount of damage" and "there are Democrats who see his decimation of the federal workforce and the federal government as an unforgivable sin."

=== Foreign policy ===
In 2023, Torres was among 56 Democrats to vote in favor of H.Con.Res. 21, which directed President Joe Biden to remove U.S. troops from Syria within 180 days.

In July 2023, Torres was among 49 Democrats to break with President Biden and vote in favor of a ban on the delivery of cluster munitions to Ukraine.

Torres voted in favor of three military aid package supplementals for Ukraine, Israel, and Taiwan, respectively, in April 2024, along with most Democrats. In a statement after the vote, he said, "The US has a singular obligation to help freedom fighters fight for their freedom, and nowhere more so than in Ukraine, whose self-defense against Putin's aggression must prevail."

In June 2025, Torres co-signed a letter led by Rep. Josh Gottheimer asking Trump to comply with the TikTok divest-or-ban law and not grant further extensions to it.

==== Kosovo ====
Since his election to the US Congress in 2019, Torres has served as a co-chair of the Congressional Albanian Issues Caucus. He has been one of the most outspoken supporters of strengthening bilateral relations between the United States and Kosovo. He has met with senior Albanian and Kosovar political representatives, including Kosovo's President, Vjosa Osmani. He called for US military assistance to Kosovo, describing it as "an unwavering ally of the US" and "America's greatest ally in the Balkans", while stating that the country represents the exact opposite of Serbia, which has served, according to Torres, as "Russia's satellite, where Vladimir Putin has been regarded the most highly respected person, while the autocratic government of Serbian President Aleksandar Vučić not only continues to defy American and European sanctions on Russia but also imports a huge amount of Russian-made weapons."

==== Israel ====
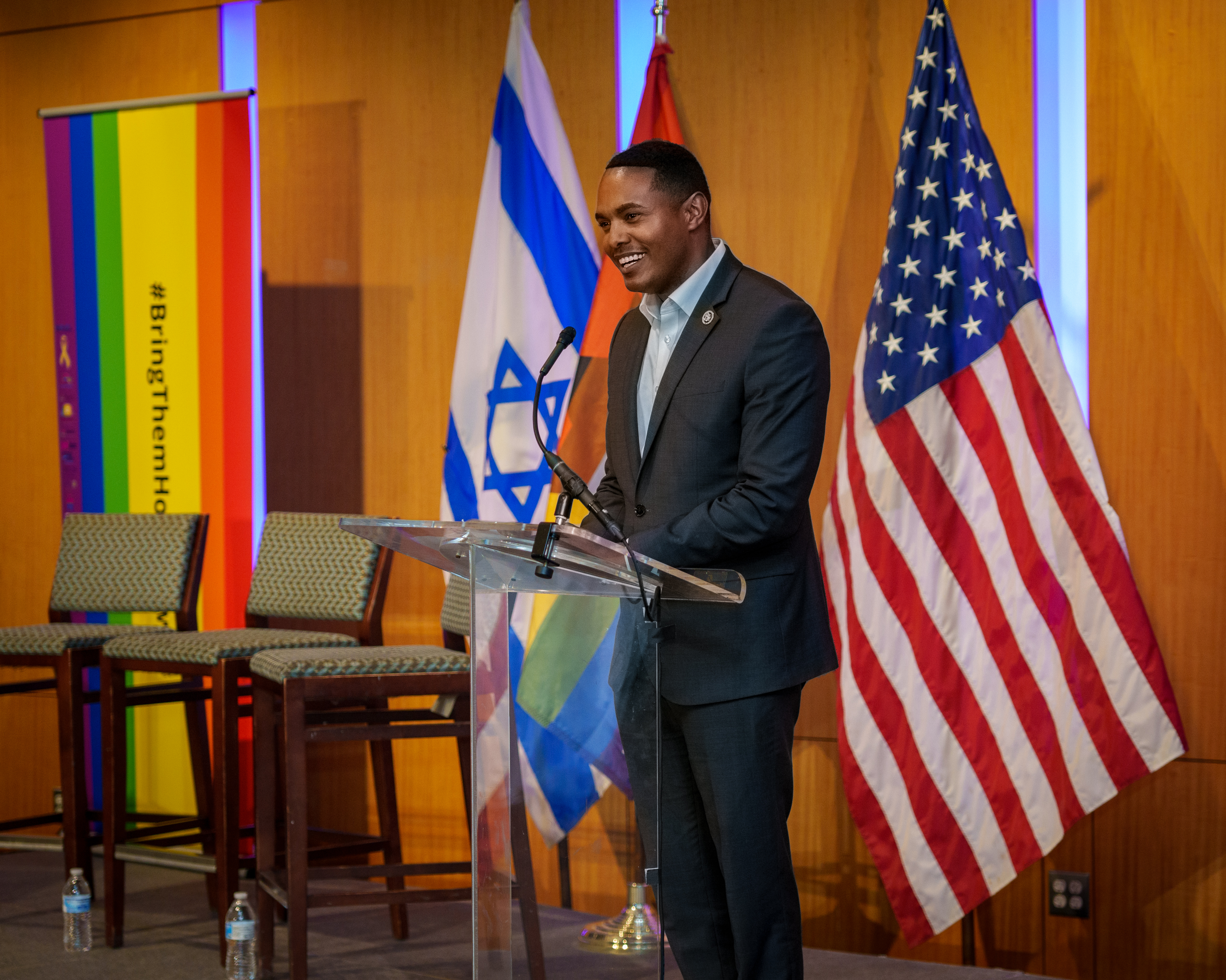
Torres speaking at the Israeli embassy to the United States in 2024 at a Pride and Solidarity event featuring Daniel-Ryan Spaulding, Judy Gold, and H.E. Michael Herzog

Torres has called himself "the embodiment of a pro-Israel progressive" and has identified as a Zionist. The progressive group Fairness & Accuracy In Reporting (FAIR) wrote that he is "aggressively pro-Israel". After winning election in 2020, he announced that he would not join The Squad, a group of left-wing Democratic representatives, because members did not vote for a resolution to condemn the Boycott, Divestment and Sanctions (BDS) movement. He has contrasted BDS's stagnancy with what he called the "path to peace" presented by the Abraham Accords. He supported a two-state solution for Israel and Palestine in 2022.

Torres has been a longtime outspoken supporter of Israel, with Politico describing him as Israel's "loudest" supporter. Torres has accused Senator John Fetterman's critics of attacking him for his "unapologetic pro-Israel politics" since media revelations about Fetterman's health.

According to The Nation, Torres has received support from Ronn Torossian, a public relations executive who has been involved in Israeli right-wing politics. In late 2023, Torossian helped Torres create Chutz PAC, a political action committee. After the October 7 attacks in 2023, Torossian started a WhatsApp group called "Jews for Ritchie Torres", which Torossian and Michael Sinensky moderated. Torossian and Sinensky said they raised over $150,000 for Torres. The Nation reported that in 2023 and 2024, Torossian introduced Torres to senior Israeli government officials and American donors. After Zeteo reported on Torossian and Sinensky's support for Torres, Torres returned their donations. According to Track AIPAC, Torres has received $1.6 million from pro-Israel lobby groups as of December 2025.

==== Gaza war ====
In November 2023, Torres rejected calls for a ceasefire in the Gaza war and called claims that Israel is committing genocide against Palestinians in the Gaza Strip a "blood libel".

On November 7, 2023, Torres was one of 22 House Democrats who voted successfully to censure Rashida Tlaib, passing a resolution that accused her of "...promoting false narratives regarding the October 7, 2023, Hamas attack", as well as criticized, in particular, her use of the slogan "from the river to the sea". In explaining why he voted for the censure, Torres wrote on Twitter, "Congress has a right to take a principled stand against hate speech calling for the destruction of the world's only Jewish nation-state." In February 2024, he left the Congressional Progressive Caucus due to disagreements over the Israeli–Palestinian conflict.

In 2024, Torres criticized and accused Fursan al-Aqsa's creator of "normalizing the most monstrous forms of antisemitic violence and terror—like beheadings, suicide bombings, and the war crimes of October 7th". Torres appeared in the films Blind Spot and October 8, discussing antisemitism on American campuses after the Hamas-led attacks on Israel and subsequent war. He has been criticized for his pro-Israel advocacy by some progressive Jews including Abby Stein, Adam Friedland, and members of Jewish Voice for Peace. Torres has also been criticized by supporters of Palestine for his strong support of Israel. When pressed by Friedland, on The Adam Friedland Show, to discuss the history that precipitated the Gaza war, Torres responded, "It just kind of sounds like you're justifying antisemitism which is making me feel uncomfortable."

Torres and Mike Lawler (R-N.Y.) introduced the COLUMBIA Act, a bill that would create "antisemitism monitors" at select colleges in the wake of the Gaza war.

=== Immigration ===
In 2021, Torres was an original cosponsor of the New Way Forward Act, which would overhaul federal immigration enforcement by eliminating mandatory detention, decriminalize unauthorized entry and reentry, narrow criminal grounds for deportation, and expand judicial discretion in removal proceedings.

In January 2025, Torres was one of 48 Democrats to vote for the Laken Riley Act, which requires U.S. Immigration and Customs Enforcement to detain undocumented immigrants accused of committing nonviolent theft-based crimes. Among those 48, he was one of seven who had previously voted against the bill in March 2024. Torres has supported ending the NYC's "right to shelter" law for people who aren't long-term residents of New York City. Torres said "When I first entered politics, I was on the left on the question of migration" and "even though law enforcement should prioritize the most violent criminals for deportation, I will no longer put myself in the position of defending anyone who commits any crime." Torres later became one of 46 House Democrats who joined all Republicans to vote for a Senate-amended version of the bill.

=== Law enforcement ===
Torres supported "defunding the police" at the height of the Black Lives Matter movement following the murder of George Floyd. He said that there "needs to be a radical redistribution of resources from policing into social services and community based alternatives to overcriminalization", and touted his work as a then-City Council member to successfully cut the NYPD's budget.

However, in February 2022, Torres said that "The defund police movement is dead in New York City and good riddance." In November 2024, during an interview on CNN with Jim Acosta, he said, "there was never a mass constituency for a movement like 'Defund the Police', so we should be taking positions that are in line with the majority of Americans", and "I want to be crystal clear, the majority of Democrats never endorsed a movement like 'Defund the Police.'" He has blamed "Defund the Police" movement for Democrats' loss of the White House.

=== Technology ===
In October 2026, Torres introduced legislation to require video games that require an online connection to provide offline modes of play after servers are shut down. Torres cited NBA 2K25, which launched on September 6, 2024, but will become unplayable on December 31, 2026 due to server shutdowns.

==== Cryptocurrency and betting ====
Torres is viewed as an ally of the cryptocurrency industry. He is a member of the Congressional Blockchain Caucus and has been a prominent critic of former SEC chair Gary Gensler's "regulation by enforcement" strategy towards cryptocurrencies. Torres, along with Sean McElwee, Drey Samuelson, Dylan Matthews, Joel Wertheimer, and Ethan Winter, urged regulators to let Americans bet on U.S. elections on platforms like Kalshi on the basis that it would increase public trust in democracy. They warned the CFTC that prohibiting such activity would worsen "the public's understanding of our democratic process" and promote "unsafe, black market exchanges". Critics argued that such a move could lead to a "gambling den" and election integrity concerns.

== Electoral history ==
Election history
Location	Year	Election	Results
NYC Council District 15	2013	Democratic Primary	Ritchie Torres 36.12% Joel Rivera 21.39% Cynthia Thompkins 20.97% Albert Alvarez 8.99% Raquel E. Batista 7.42% Joel M. Bauza 5.11%
NYC Council District 15	2013	General	Ritchie Torres (D) 91.15% Joel Rivera (R) 7.19% Joel M. Bauza (Conservative) 1.46%
NYC Council District 15	2017	General	Ritchie Torres (D/WF) 93.6% Jayson Cancel (R/C) 6.3%
United States Congress New York's 15th congressional district	2020	Democratic Primary	Ritchie Torres 29.44% Michael Blake 18.74% Ruben Diaz Sr. 14.30% Samelys López 12.77% Ydanis Rodríguez 11.02%
United States Congress New York's 15th congressional district	2020	General	Ritchie Torres (D) 88.88% Patrick Delices (R/C) 11.12%
United States Congress New York's 15th congressional district	2022	General	Ritchie Torres (D) 82.70% Stylo Sapaskis (R) 17.19%
United States Congress New York's 15th congressional district	2024	General	Ritchie Torres (D) 76.48% Gonzalo Duran (R/C) 21.12% Jose Vega (Independent) 2.40%
United States Congress New York's 15th congressional district	2026	Democratic Primary	Ritchie Torres 70.80% Michael Blake 21.46% Jose Vega 5.49%
United States Congress New York's 15th congressional district	2026	General	Ritchie Torres (D) 74.04% Stylo Sapaskis (R) 10.26% Andre Easton (PSL) 8.40% Jose Vega (Speak the Truth) 1.85% Gonzalo Duran (C) 1.64%

== See also ==
- List of African-American United States representatives
- List of Afro-Latinos
- List of Hispanic and Latino Americans in the United States Congress
- List of LGBT people from New York City
- LGBT culture in New York City
- Nuyorican
- NYC Pride March
- Puerto Ricans in New York City

U.S. House of Representatives
Preceded by José E. Serrano	Member of the U.S. House of Representatives from New York's 15th congressional district 2021–present	Incumbent
U.S. order of precedence (ceremonial)
Preceded by Marilyn Strickland	United States representatives by seniority 277th	Succeeded by Beth Van Duyne
