= Joel Rivera =

American politician

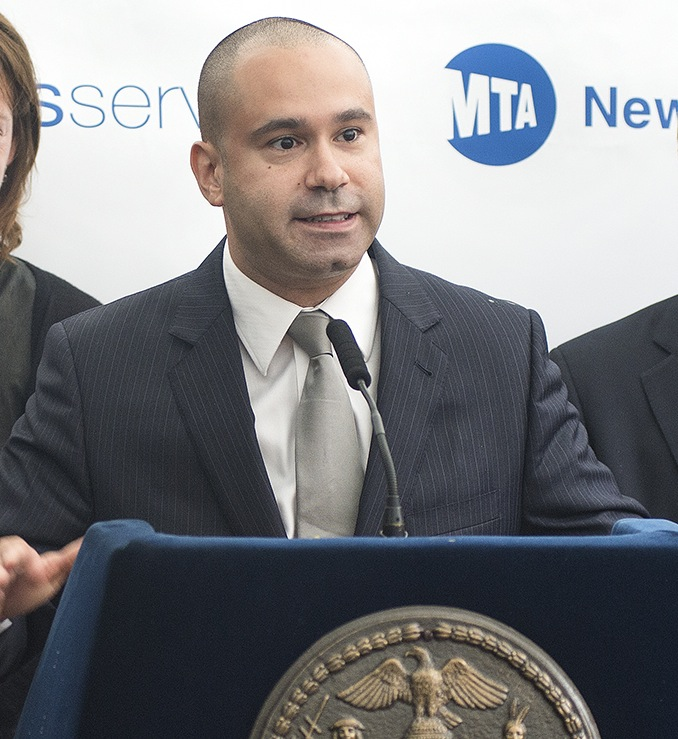

Majority Leader of the New York City Council
- In office January 1, 2002 – December 31, 2013
- Speaker: Gifford Miller; Christine Quinn
- Succeeded by: Jimmy Van Bramer

Member of the New York City Council for the 15th district
- In office February 20, 2001 – December 31, 2013
- Preceded by: Jose Rivera
- Succeeded by: Ritchie Torres

Personal details
- Born: October 24, 1978 (age 48)
- Party: Democratic
- Relations: Jose Rivera (father); Naomi Rivera (half-sister)
- Children: 3

Joel Rivera (born October 24, 1978) is an American politician who served as a member and the majority leader of the New York City Council. First elected to the Council in a special election in 2001 at 22 years of age, Rivera became the youngest elected official in the city's history. He continued to win re-election until reaching his legal term limit in 2013.

== Early life and education ==
Rivera was born to Ivine Galarza and Jose Rivera. He graduated from the New York Military Academy, a private boarding school, and went on to attend Iona College, Fordham University, and Baruch College.

== Career ==
Rivera succeeded his father, Assemblyman Jose Rivera, as the New York City Councilmember for District 15 in 2001. He became Majority Leader of the City Council the following year. As chair of the Health Committee, he helped to ban trans fat and mandate calorie labeling in New York City fast food restaurants, and launched an Obesity Prevention Initiative, which funded the HealthCorps program in local schools. Rivera is also the founder of BronxPad, a website dedicated to "Helping Home Buyers and Home Sellers Achieve their Real Estate Goals."

In September 2007, he was named one of City Hall's "40 under 40" for being a young influential member of New York City politics.

== Personal life ==
Rivera married Joyce Lee Hernandez Lopez in 2016 and they have three children together. Rivera was married previously married to Valerie Vazquez. The couple has a daughter, Sophia.

Political offices
Preceded by Jose Rivera	New York City Council, 15th district 2001–2013	Succeeded by Ritchie Torres
