= St. Barbara's Church (Brooklyn) =

Roman Catholic parish church in Brooklyn, New York, USA

Coordinates: 40°41′44.3″N 73°55′13.16″W

The Church of St. Barbara
- Main entrance of St. Barbara’s Roman Catholic Church, fall 2026

General information
- Architectural style: Spanish Baroque Revival
- Location: Bushwick, Brooklyn, New York, United States
- Completed: 1910
- Client: Roman Catholic Archdiocese of New York

Design and construction
- Architect: Helmle and Huberty

The Church of St. Barbara is a Roman Catholic parish church under the authority of the Roman Catholic Diocese of Brooklyn, located in northern Brooklyn, New York, in the Bushwick-Ridgewood neighborhood. The parish was established as a national parish to serve the German Catholic community, which later became Italian and then Hispanic by the 1960s.

== Description ==
Main Altar of St. Barbara’s Roman Catholic Church

The church was built 1910 to the designs of the architectural firm of Helmle and Huberty. The AIA Guide to New York City wrote that the parish was "named not only for the saint but for the brewer Leonard Eppig's little daughter Barbara — Eppig contributed to the parish. Nearby St. Leonard's had a similar history of naming."
