= Jamaal Bailey =

American politician (born 1982)

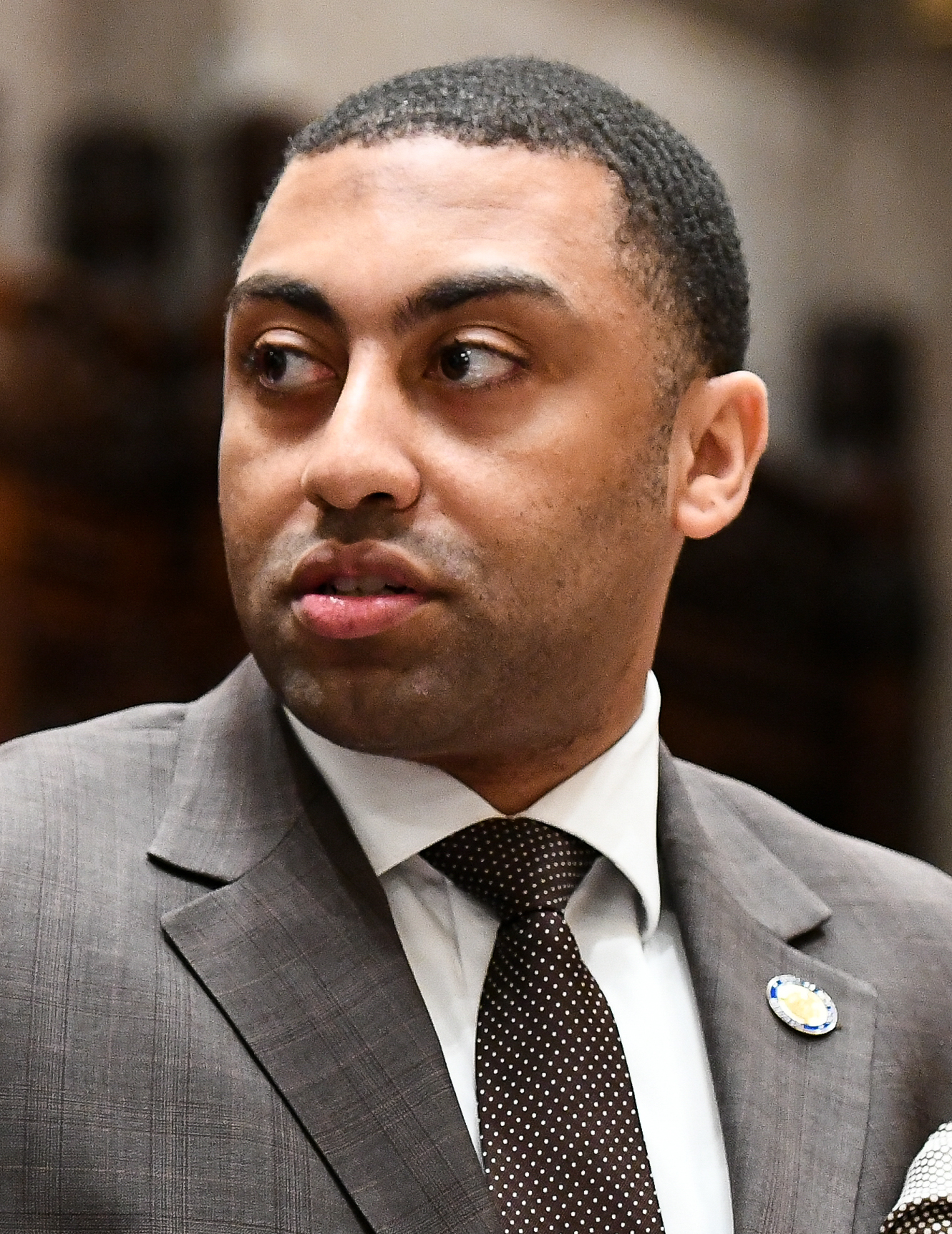

Chair of the Bronx Democratic Party
- Incumbent
- Assumed office September 30, 2020
- Preceded by: Marcos Crespo

Member of the New York Senate from the 36th district
- Incumbent
- Assumed office January 1, 2017
- Preceded by: Ruth Hassell-Thompson

Personal details
- Born: New York City, New York, U.S.
- Party: Democratic
- Spouse: Giamara Bailey
- Children: 3
- Education: University at Albany, SUNY (BA); City University of New York (JD)

Jamaal T. Bailey is an American politician from the state of New York. A Democrat, Bailey has served as a member of the New York State Senate from the 36th district since 2017. He represents the Bronx neighborhoods of Baychester, Co-op City, Wakefield, Williamsbridge, and Woodlawn, along with the Westchester County city of Mount Vernon.

== Early life and education ==
Bailey was born and raised in the Bronx, where he attended New York City Public Schools, including P.S. 83 in Morris Park and M.S 181 in Co-op City. He is a graduate of the Bronx High School of Science. Bailey earned a Bachelor of Arts degree from the University at Albany, SUNY and a Juris Doctor from the CUNY School of Law.

== Career ==
Bailey began his political career as an intern to Assemblymember Carl Heastie. He later worked as Heastie's district director and served as district leader in the 83rd Assembly District for six years.

Bailey was elected chair of the Bronx Democratic Party on September 30, 2020.

=== New York State Senate ===
In mid-2016, state Senator Ruth Hassell-Thompson resigned from her seat to take a position with New York Governor Andrew Cuomo. Bailey ran in the Democratic primary to replace her. He prevailed in a five-way primary contest on September 13, 2016 and defeated Conservative Robert Diamond in the general election on November 8, 2016. Bailey defeated Diamond again in 2018, and went on to win re-election in 2020, 2022, and 2024.

Bailey was named chair of the Senate Insurance Committee in 2025. He previously chaired the Senate Codes Committee.

== Personal life ==
Bailey is married. He and his wife, Giamara, reside in Baychester with their son and two daughters.

Party political offices
Preceded by Marcos Crespo	Chair of the Bronx Democratic Party; 2020–present	Incumbent
