= Senator Seabrook =

Senator Seabrook may refer to:

- Larry Seabrook (born 1951), New York State Senate
- Whitemarsh Benjamin Seabrook (1793–1855), South Carolina State Senate
