= Peragallo =

Peragallo is a surname. Notable people with the name include:

- John Peragallo Jr. (1932–2008), American businessman, president of the Peragallo Pipe Organ Company
- Nilda (Nena) Peragallo (living), the Dean and Professor of the School of Nursing and Health Studies at the University of Miami, Florida
