= New York's 36th State Senate district =

American legislative district

Senator
Jamaal Bailey; D–Baychester
- Registration: 79.5% Democratic; 4.1% Republican; 13.6% No party preference
- Demographics: 6% White; 56% Black; 31% Hispanic; 4% Asian
- Population (2017): 336,131
- Registered voters: 191,602

New York's 36th State Senate district is one of 63 districts in the New York State Senate. It has been represented by Democrat Jamaal Bailey since 2017; Bailey succeeded fellow Democrat Ruth Hassell-Thompson after she took a position in the administration of Governor Andrew Cuomo.

== Geography ==
=== 2020s ===
District 36 covers several neighborhoods in the north Bronx, including Bedford Park, Williamsbridge, Co-op City, Wakefield, and Baychester, as well as the southern Westchester County city of Mount Vernon.

The district overlaps New York's 14th, 15th, and 16th congressional districts, with the 80th, 81st, 82nd, 83rd, and 89th districts of the New York State Assembly, the 11th, 12th and 13th districts of the New York City Council, and the 13th and 14th districts of the Westchester County Board of Legislators.

=== 2010s ===
District 36 covers several neighborhoods in the north Bronx, including Norwood, Bedford Park, Williamsbridge, Co-op City, Wakefield, and Baychester, as well as the southern Westchester County city of Mount Vernon.

The district overlaps New York's 13th, 14th, and 16th congressional districts, the 78th, 80th, 81st, 82nd, 83rd, and 89th districts of the New York State Assembly, the 11th, 12th, 13th and 15th districts of the New York City Council, and the 13th and 14th districts of the Westchester County Board of Legislators.

== Recent election results ==
=== 2026 ===
2026 New York State Senate election, District 36
Party	Candidate	Votes	%
Democratic	Jamaal Bailey (incumbent)		
Conservative	Grace Marrero		
Write-in			
Total votes			100.0

=== 2024 ===
2024 New York State Senate election, District 36
Party	Candidate	Votes	%
Democratic	Jamaal Bailey (incumbent)	77,594	91.5
Conservative	Irene Estrada	7,086	8.4
Write-in		133	0.1
Total votes		84,813	100.0
Democratic hold			

=== 2022 ===
2022 New York State Senate election, District 36
Party	Candidate	Votes	%
Democratic	Jamaal Bailey (incumbent)	49,613	99.7
Write-in		154	0.3
Total votes		49,767	100.0
Democratic hold			

=== 2020 ===
2020 New York State Senate election, District 36
Party	Candidate	Votes	%
Democratic	Jamaal Bailey (incumbent)	98,096	95.4
Conservative	Robert Diamond	4,649	4.5
Write-in		49	0.1
Total votes		102,794	100.0
Democratic hold			

=== 2018 ===
2018 New York State Senate election, District 36
Party	Candidate	Votes	%
Democratic	Jamaal Bailey	73,189	
Working Families	Jamaal Bailey	1,516	
Total	Jamaal Bailey (incumbent)	74,705	97.8
Conservative	Robert Diamond	1,688	2.2
Write-in		23	0.0
Total votes		76,416	100.0
Democratic hold			

=== 2016 ===
2016 New York State Senate election, District 36
Primary election
Party	Candidate	Votes	%
Democratic	Jamaal Bailey	8,629	55.6
Democratic	Edward Mulraine	2,503	16.1
Democratic	Pamela Hamilton-Johnson	2,270	14.6
Democratic	Que English	1,175	7.6
Democratic	Alvin Ponder	932	6.0
Write-in		21	0.1
Total votes		15,530	100.0
General election
Democratic	Jamaal Bailey	85,907	
Working Families	Jamaal Bailey	2,326	
Total	Jamaal Bailey	88,233	97.2
Conservative	Robert Diamond	2,456	2.7
Write-in		72	0.1
Total votes		90,761	100.0
Democratic hold			

=== 2014 ===
2014 New York State Senate election, District 36
Primary election
Party	Candidate	Votes	%
Democratic	Ruth Hassell-Thompson (incumbent)	9,807	83.6
Democratic	Crystal Collins	1,876	16.0
Write-in		43	0.4
Total votes		11,726	100.0
General election
Democratic	Ruth Hassell-Thompson (incumbent)	37,166	92.1
Republican	Robert Diamond	1,933	
Conservative	Robert Diamond	455	
Total	Robert Diamond	2,388	5.9
Independence	Crystal Collins	766	1.9
Write-in		27	0.1
Total votes		40,347	100.0
Democratic hold			

=== 2012 ===
2012 New York State Senate election, District 36
Party	Candidate	Votes	%
Democratic	Ruth Hassell-Thompson (incumbent)	86,733	97.7
Conservative	Robert Diamond	2,020	2.3
Write-in		22	0.0
Total votes		88,775	100.0
Democratic hold			

=== Federal results in District 36 ===
Year	Office	Results
2020	President	Biden 90.0 – 9.2%
2016	President	Clinton 92.6 – 5.9%
2012	President	Obama 95.1 – 4.6%
2012	Senate	Gillibrand 95.7 – 3.8%
