= Andy King (American politician) =

American politician (born 1962)

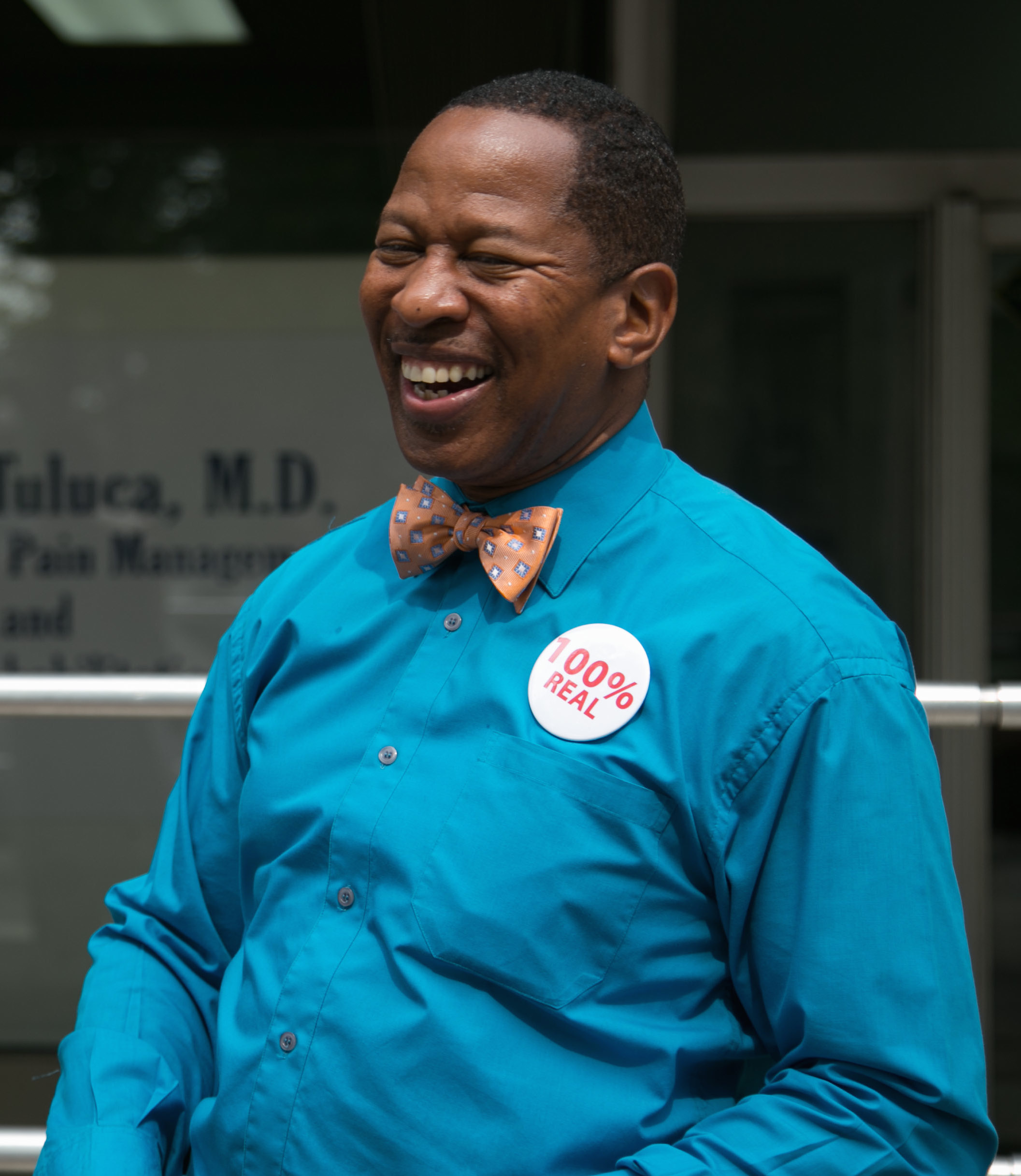
- King in 2013

Member of the New York City Council from the 12th district
- In office November 7, 2012 – October 5, 2020
- Preceded by: Larry Seabrook
- Succeeded by: Kevin Riley

Personal details
- Born: March 12, 1962 (age 64) The Bronx, New York, U.S.
- Party: Democratic
- Spouse: Neva Shillingford
- Education: Midwestern State University; William Paterson University (BA)

Andy King (born March 12, 1962) is an American politician. A Democrat, he is the former Council Member for the 12th district of the New York City Council, which includes the Baychester, Co-op City, Edenwald, Eastchester, Wakefield, and Williamsbridge sections of The Bronx. King and his wife, Neva Shillingford-King are the founders of the Bronx Youth Empowerment Program (YEP). King was expelled from the City Council on October 5, 2020.

== Life and career ==
A native of The Bronx and a graduate of Evander Childs High School, King attended Midwestern State University on a basketball scholarship, and eventually transferred to William Paterson University. After graduating with a Bachelor of Arts degree in communications, King worked as a NYC Child Protective Caseworker. In 2007 King became the Bronx Lead Organizer for 1199SEIU/GNYHA Healthcare Education Project (HEP).

In early 2015, King was accused by a former staffer, that she was wrongfully fired after refusing his alleged sexual advances. However, no formal court charges have been filed to date.

In November 2015, King was fined for unlawfully using campaign funds for personal use, including several expenditures for his wife's personal expenses. King also "charged his campaign $3,568.70 for a Verizon phone line at his home address, despite billing a separate office phone line to the campaign". This was in addition to previous fines he had received in 2012 for other finance misappropriation.

Following an investigation by the New York City Council Committee on Ethics and Standards, King was expelled from the council, with a vote of 48 in favor and 2 opposed.

== New York City Council ==
King initially ran for New York City Council in 2009, but lost in the Democratic primary to incumbent Larry Seabrook. However, when Seabrook resigned in 2012 following a scandal, King won the special election to replace him.

He went on to win a full term in 2013, easily rolling back primary challengers and winning nearly 96% of the vote in the general election. In 2015, Council Speaker Melissa Mark Viverito named King the chair on the Subcommittee on Libraries.

In October 2020, King was expelled, in what The New York Times called "a stunning rebuke ... the first time in the city's history that a council member was expelled in a vote by colleagues." Voting 48–2, the council expelled King based on four charges, including harassment, discrimination, and conflict of interest.

In May 2023, a judge allowed Andy King to run for the New York City Council again because he would not be running for a third consecutive term. The 2023 election cycle would be considered a non-consecutive run because of the 3 1/2-year break and there are new council districts and district lines were drawn after the 2020 census. New York City Supreme Court Judge Billings explained that there is a difference between the words "removal" and "expulsion". King was not removed from office in 2020. Therefore, he did not serve out all 4 years of his second term on the New York City Council.

== Electoral history ==
Election history
Location	Year	Election	Results
NYC Council District 12	2009	Democratic Primary	√ Larry Seabrook 55.81% Andy King 32.41; Jerome L. Rice 8.4% Sebastien D. Ulanga 3.38%
NYC Council District 12	2012	Special	√ Andy King (D) 79.71% Cheryl S. Oliver (D) 5.53% Neville Mitchell (D) 4.51% Pamela A. Johnson (D) 4.4% Joseph Nwachukwu (D) 2.9% Garth Marchant (D) 2.93%
NYC Council District 12	2013	Democratic Primary	√ Andy King 57.36% Pamela Johnson 32.59% Lenford Edie 5.03% Adeyemi Lacrown Toba 5.03%
NYC Council District 12	2013	General	√ Andy King (D) 95.59% Robert Diamond (R) 3.12% Trevor Archer (Green) 1.21% Write-Ins .08%
NYC Council District 12	2017	Democratic Primary	√ Andy King 68.18% Pamela Hamilton-Johnson 27.21% Karree-Lyn Gordon 4.41%
NYC Council District 12	2017	General	√ Andy King (D) 93.96% Adrienne Erwin (Conservative) 5.91%

Political offices
Preceded by Larry Seabrook	Member of the New York City Council from the 12th district 2012–2020	Succeeded by Kevin Riley
