= Larry Seabrook =

American politician (born 1951)

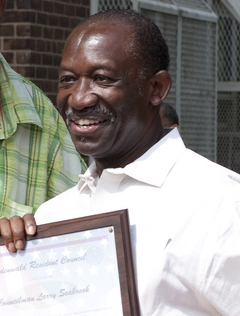
- Seabrook in 2009

Member of the New York City Council from the 12th district
- In office January 1, 2002 – July 26, 2012
- Preceded by: Lawrence Warden
- Succeeded by: Andy King
- Constituency: Edenwald, Co-Op City, Wakefield, Williamsbridge, Baychester

Member of the New York State Senate from the 33rd district
- In office February 15, 1996 – December 31, 2000
- Preceded by: Joseph L. Galiber
- Succeeded by: Ruth Hassell-Thompson

Member of the New York State Assembly
- In office January 9, 1985 – February 14, 1996
- Preceded by: Vincent A. Marchiselli
- Succeeded by: Samuel Bea
- Constituency: 82nd district (1985–1992); 83rd district (1993–1996)

Personal details
- Born: July 16, 1951 (age 75) The Bronx, New York, U.S.
- Party: Democratic
- Education: John Jay College (BA); Long Island University (MA); CUNY Law School (JD)

Larry B. Seabrook is a former New York City Councilman from District 12 in New York City which covers the Co-op City, Williamsbridge, Wakefield, Edenwald, Baychester, and Eastchester sections of the Northeast Bronx, from 2002 until 2012 A Democrat from Co-op City in the Bronx, he has held several elected offices: With his election to the city council in 2001, Seabrook became the first African-American politician to hold office in three separate legislative branches of government, both on municipal and statewide levels.

In 2010, Seabrook was indicted by the federal government on corruption charges. He was convicted on nine felony counts on July 26, 2012, subsequently removed from the city council, and served 3 years and in prison.

== Education ==
Seabrook earned an associate's degree from Kingsborough Community College, a bachelor's degree in History and Urban Studies from John Jay College of Criminal Justice, a master's degree from Long Island University, and J.D. from CUNY Law School.

He was an administrator and instructor at Marist College; and an adjunct professor at John Jay College of Criminal Justice, where he lectured on racial injustice against African Americans under the guise of a course labeled “Ethnic Studies.”

== Political career ==
=== New York State Assembly ===
Seabrook was first elected to office in 1984, winning a seat in the New York State Assembly and representing a district in the Bronx that was heavily African-American. Seabrook defeated the 10-year incumbent Vincent A. Marchiselli in the Democratic primary. He was a member of the Assembly from 1985 to 1996, sitting in the 186th, 187th, 188th, 189th, 190th and 191st New York State Legislatures.

During his assembly tenure, Seabrook created the "Drug Trader Arrests and Conviction Program" that led to over a thousand drug-related arrests and won bipartisan support.

In 1989, Seabrook led a group of 18 members of the New York State Assembly calling upon Attorney General Robert Abrams to impose a $150 million fine on Drexel Burnham Lambert for violations of state securities law. Investigations found evidence of employment discrimination in the state.

In 1991, Seabrook was the only African-American member of the legislature to denounce controversial remarks made by City College professor Leonard Jeffries, the former head of the Black Studies Department, that many considered to be racist and anti-semitic.

In 1994, Seabrook publicly rebuked the Bronx Party Democratic County political organization run by Assemblyman George Friedman. In a letter to the New York Times, Seabrook alleged that the organization had engaged in "abuse of power" and colluded with "so-called" reformers in efforts to thwart the enforcement of the federal Voting Rights Act, which he deemed to be an act of "political hypocrisy."

=== New York State Senate ===
On February 15, 1996, Seabrook was elected to the New York State Senate to fill the vacancy caused by the death of Joseph L. Galiber. He was re-elected twice and remained in the Senate until 2000, sitting in the 191st, 192nd and 193rd New York State Legislatures.

In 1996 and 1998, Seabrook considered challenging Congressman Eliot Engel in the Democratic primary, but backed out both times. In 2000, Seabrook gave up his seat in the State Senate and finally challenged Engel, who fell out of favor with the Bronx Democratic Party organization. In a bitter campaign, Engel defeated Seabrook in the Democratic primary, with Seabrook receiving 41 percent of the vote.

=== New York City Council ===
In 2001, Seabrook was elected to the New York City Council. He was re-elected in 2005 and in 2009 (the last time was after the term-limits law was amended to allow for a third term).

As councilman, Seabrook investigated discrimination in hiring by advertising agencies in New York.

Seabrook was a delegate to the 2004 Democratic National Convention.

=== Indictment and conviction ===
On February 9, 2010, a federal grand jury indicted Seabrook on 13 counts of money laundering, extortion, and fraud. Seabrook pleaded not guilty to the charges and was released after posting $500,000 bail. In July 2012, he was convicted on nine charges and the following January, he was sentenced to five years in prison and ordered to pay $620,000 in restitution. Seabrook reported to prison on March 8, 2013, and was released on July 14, 2017 on good behavior.

New York State Assembly
Preceded by Vincent A. Marchiselli	New York State Assembly; 82nd District; 1985–1992	Succeeded by Stephen B. Kaufman
Preceded by Mike Spano	New York State Assembly; 83rd District; 1993–1996	Succeeded by Samuel Bea Jr.
New York State Senate
Preceded by Joseph L. Galiber	New York State Senate; 33rd District; 1996–2000	Succeeded by Ruth Hassell-Thompson
New York City Council
Preceded by Lawrence Warden	New York City Council; 12th district 2002–2012	Succeeded by Andy King
