= Ruth Hassell-Thompson =

New York State Senator

Member of the New York State Senate
- In office January 1, 2001 – June 30, 2016
- Preceded by: Larry Seabrook
- Succeeded by: Jamaal Bailey
- Constituency: 33rd district (2001-2002); 36th district (2003-2016)

Personal details
- Born: November 6, 1942 (age 83) Mount Vernon, New York, U.S.
- Party: Democratic
- Children: 2
- Occupation: Nurse/Counselor

Ruth Hassell-Thompson (née Hassell; born November 6, 1942) of Mount Vernon, New York, is a former State Senator who represented the 36th district of New York, which includes the Bronx neighborhoods of Norwood, Bedford Park, Williamsbridge, Co-op City, Wakefield and Baychester and City of Mount Vernon.

== Political career and background ==
Born November 6, 1942 in New York City to Branon Hassell and Thelma Crump Hassell, Hassell-Thompson worked as a pediatric nurse and substance abuse counselor for Mount Vernon Hospital from 1963 to 1998. From January 1980 to June 1987, she was executive director of the Westchester Minority Contractor's Association (WMCA). Prior to leading the WMCA, she worked for the Westchester Community Opportunity Program for 10 years in a number of management positions.

She served as president/CEO of Whart Development Company Inc., a real estate development company and a consultant to small and developing businesses before being elected to Mount Vernon City Council in 1993. She would later serve as council president and acting mayor.

In 2000, she was elected to the State Senate. She is the chairwoman of the Crime Victims, Crime and Corrections Committee and is a former ranking minority member on the Consumer Protection and Judiciary committees.

Hassell-Thompson announced on April 22, 2016, that she would be leaving the Senate to work for Governor Andrew Cuomo. She worked as special adviser for policy and community affairs of New York State Homes and Community Renewal.

== See also ==
- New York State Senate
- 2009 New York State Senate leadership crisis

== Notes ==
New York State Senate
Preceded by Larry Seabrook	New York State Senate, 33rd District; 2001–2002	Succeeded by Efrain Gonzalez
Preceded by Suzi Oppenheimer	New York State Senate, 36th District; 2003–2016	Succeeded by Jamaal Bailey
Political offices
Preceded by Michael Nozzolio	Chairwoman of the Senate Committee on Crime Victims Crime and Corrections; 2009–2010	Succeeded by Michael Nozzolio
