= New York City's 12th City Council district =

- Boundaries following the 2020 census

Government
  - Councilmember: Kevin Riley (D—Eastchester)

Population (2010)
  - Total: 171,182

Demographics
  - Black: 67%
  - Hispanic: 25%
  - White: 4%
  - Asian: 2%
  - Other: 3%

Registration
  - Democratic: 79.9%
  - Republican: 3.4%
  - No party preference: 14.0%
- Registered voters (2021) 112,477

New York City's 12th City Council district is one of 51 districts in the New York City Council. It has been represented by Democrat Kevin Riley since a 2020 special election to replace disgraced fellow Democrat Andy King.

== Geography ==
District 12 covers the farthest northeastern neighborhoods of the Bronx, including all of Williamsbridge, Baychester, Edenwald, Co-op City, and Eastchester as well as part of Wakefield and Allerton.

The district overlaps with Bronx Community Boards 10, 11, and 12, and is contained within New York's 15th and 16th congressional district, with a small extension into the 14th district. It is also entirely contained within New York's 36th State Senate district, and overlaps (partially) with the 80th, 82nd, and 83rd districts of the New York State Assembly.

With its population base in heavily-Black neighborhoods like Williamsbridge and Baychester, District 12 is the only majority-Black City Council district in the Bronx.

=== 2010s ===
District 12 covers the farthest northeastern neighborhoods of the Bronx, including all of Williamsbridge, Baychester, Co-op City, and Eastchester as well as part of Wakefield.

The district overlaps with Bronx Community Boards 10, 11, and 12, and is contained almost entirely within New York's 16th congressional district, with a small extension into the 14th district. It also overlaps with the 34th and 36th districts of the New York State Senate, and with the 80th, 81st, 82nd, and 83rd districts of the New York State Assembly.

== Recent election results ==
=== 2025 ===
2025 New York City Council election, District 12
Primary election
Party	Candidate	Votes	%
Democratic	Kevin Riley (incumbent)	13,662	75.4
Democratic	Andy King	4,343	24.0
Write-in		119	0.7
Total votes		18,124	100.0
General election
Democratic	Kevin Riley (incumbent)	28,065	90.4
Republican	Franchie Muniz Sr.	2,035	6.6
Conservative	James Washington-Ward	651	
United Alliance	James Washington-Ward	222	
Total	James Washington-Ward	873	2.8
Write-in		61	0.2
Total votes		31,034	100.0
Democratic hold			

=== 2023 (redistricting) ===
Due to redistricting and the 2020 changes to the New York City Charter, councilmembers elected during the 2021 and 2023 City Council elections will serve two-year terms, with full four-year terms resuming after the 2025 New York City Council elections.

2023 New York City Council election, District 12
Primary election
Party	Candidate	Votes	%
Democratic	Kevin Riley (incumbent)	5,882	81.7
Democratic	Pamela Hamilton-Johnson	902	12.5
Democratic	Aisha Ahmed	396	5.5
Write-in		20	0.3
Total votes		7,200	100.0
General election
Democratic	Kevin Riley (incumbent)	9,557	92.8
Republican	Dewayne Lee	692	6.7
Write-in		54	0.5
Total votes		10,303	100.0
Democratic hold			

=== 2021 ===
In 2019, voters in New York City approved Ballot Question 1, which implemented ranked-choice voting in all local elections. Under the new system, voters have the option to rank up to five candidates for every local office. Voters whose first-choice candidates fare poorly will have their votes redistributed to other candidates in their ranking until one candidate surpasses the 50 percent threshold. If one candidate surpasses 50 percent in first-choice votes, then ranked-choice tabulations will not occur.

2021 New York City Council election, District 12 Democratic primary
Party	Candidate	Maximum round	Maximum votes	Share in maximum round	Maximum votes First round votes Transfer votes
Democratic	Kevin Riley (incumbent)	3	9,595	59.1%	
Democratic	Pamela Hamilton-Johnson	3	6,643	40.9%	
Democratic	Shanequa Moore	2	3,660	21.1%	
Write-in		1	209	1.2%	

An interactive map of District 12

2021 New York City Council election, District 12 general election
Party	Candidate	Votes	%
Democratic	Kevin Riley (incumbent)	17,959	99.5
Write-in		80	0.5
Total votes		18,039	100
Democratic hold			

=== 2020 special ===
In October 2020, Andy King was expelled from the City Council for harassment, discrimination, and conflict of interest, triggering a special election for his seat. Like all municipal special elections in New York City, the race was officially nonpartisan, with all candidates running on ballot lines of their own creation.

2020 New York City Council special election, District 12
Party	Candidate	Votes	%
Justice & Unity	Kevin Riley	4,879	68.1
Social Change	Pamela Hamilton-Johnson	1,747	24.4
Bronx 12 Matters	Neville Mitchell	236	3.3
Write-in	Bernard Cylich	143	2.0
Write-in		136	1.9
Total votes		7,160	100

=== 2017 ===
2017 New York City Council election, District 12
Primary election
Party	Candidate	Votes	%
Democratic	Andy King (incumbent)	7,936	68.2
Democratic	Pamela Hamilton-Johnson	3,167	27.2
Democratic	Karree-Lyn Gordon	513	4.4
Write-in		23	0.2
Total votes		11,639	100
General election
Democratic	Andy King (incumbent)	22,022	94.0
Conservative	Adrienne Erwin	1,384	5.9
Write-in		31	0.1
Total votes		23,437	100
Democratic hold			

=== 2013 ===
2013 New York City Council election, District 12
Primary election
Party	Candidate	Votes	%
Democratic	Andy King (incumbent)	8,638	57.4
Democratic	Pamela Johnson	4,907	32.6
Democratic	Lenford Edie	757	5.0
Democratic	Adeyemi LaCrown Toba	757	5.0
Write-in		0	0.0
Total votes		15,061	100
General election
Democratic	Andy King	21,044	
Working Families	Andy King	546	
Total	Andy King (incumbent)	21,590	95.6
Republican	Robert Diamond	571	
Conservative	Robert Diamond	133	
Total	Robert Diamond	704	3.1
Green	Trevor Archer	274	1.2
Write-in		17	0.1
Total votes		22,585	100
Democratic hold			
