= Kevin Riley (politician) =

American politician (born 1987)

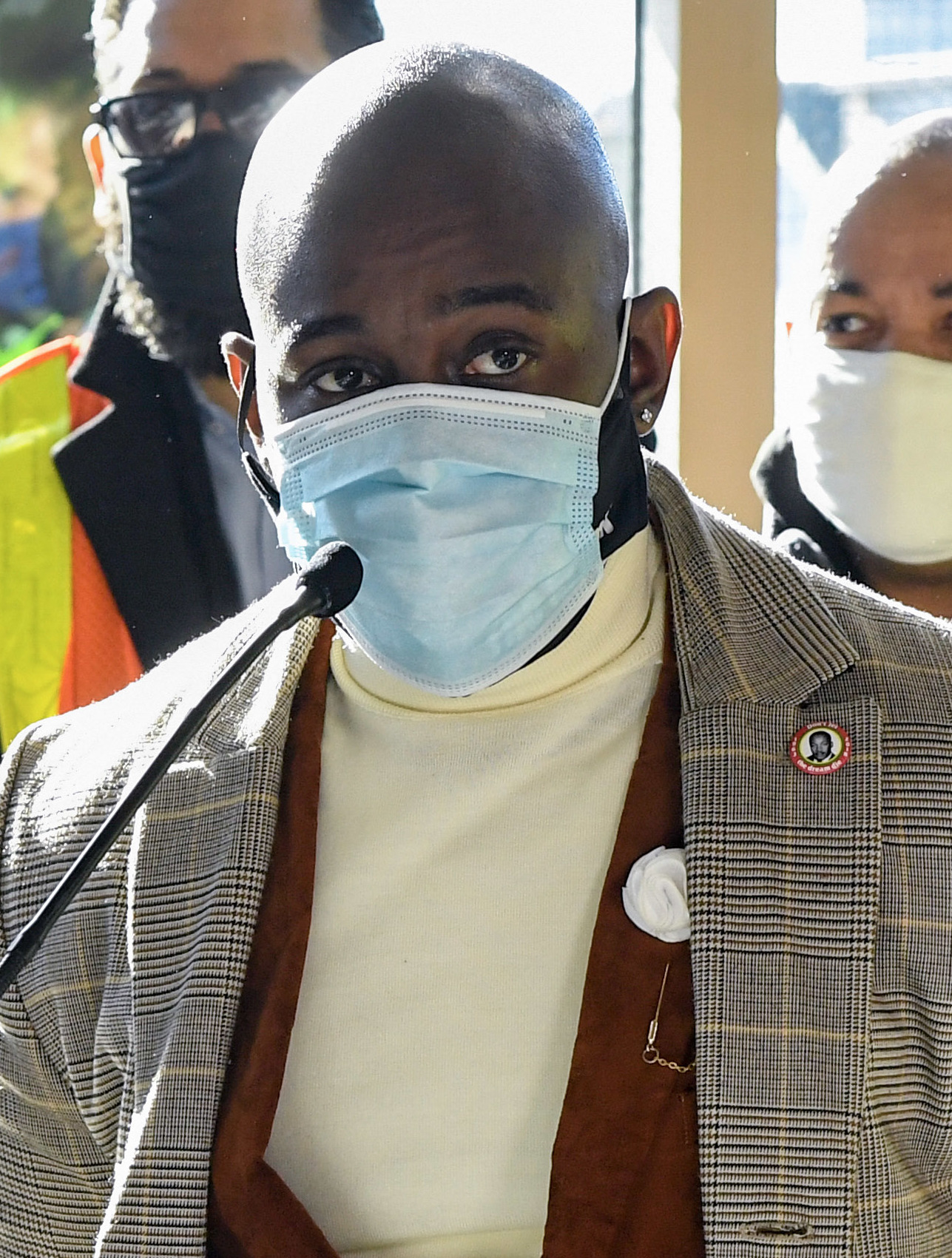

Member of the New York City Council from the 12th district
- Incumbent
- Assumed office January 6, 2021
- Preceded by: Andy King

Personal details
- Born: November 16, 1987 (age 38) New York City, U.S.
- Party: Democratic
- Children: 3
- Education: State University of New York, Old Westbury (BA); Metropolitan College of New York (MPA)
- Website: Official website Campaign website

Kevin Christopher Riley (born November 16, 1987) is an American politician. A Democrat, he serves as the New York City Councilmember for the 12th district. The district includes Wakefield, Olinville, Edenwald, Eastchester, Williamsbridge, Baychester, Co-op City in The Bronx.

== Early life and education ==
Riley grew up and lives in Baychester, The Bronx. He graduated from Mount Saint Michael Academy in Wakefield before attending State University of New York at Old Westbury where he received a B.A. and an M.P.A. from Metropolitan College of New York. He has two daughters and one son.

== Career ==
Prior to running for office, Riley was an aide to Assembly Speaker Carl Heastie for ten years. He was also a Democratic Male District Leader for the 83rd Assembly District.

=== New York City Council ===
On December 22, 2020, Riley won a special election in the 12th district following the expulsion of Council Member Andy King. Riley outraised his opponents and received a significant amount of endorsements from high-ranking elected official and unions, which some attributed to his close relationship to Assembly Speaker Carl Heastie, one of the most powerful politicians in the State. He was sworn in on January 6, 2021, and named chair of the Subcommittee on Landmarks, Public Sitings, and Dispositions.

On the proposed City of Yes plan to increase housing supply in New York City, Riley said, "Some of these reforms make a lot of sense. The problem is that the proposal doesn’t identify the specific housing needs that different types of neighborhoods have."

== Electoral history ==
=== 2025 ===
2025 New York City Council Democratic primary, District 12
Party	Candidate	Votes	%
Democratic	Kevin Riley (incumbent)	13,662	75.4
Democratic	Andy King	4,343	24.0
Write-in		119	0.7
Total votes		18,124	100.0

2025 New York City Council election, District 12
Party	Candidate	Votes	%
Democratic	Kevin Riley (incumbent)	28,065	90.4
Republican	Franchie Muniz Sr.	2,035	6.6
Conservative	James Washington-Ward	651	2.1
United Alliance	James Washington-Ward	222	0.7
Total	James Washington-Ward	873	2.8
Write-in		61	0.2
Total votes		31,034	100.0
Democratic hold			

=== 2023 ===
2023 New York City Council Democratic primary, District 12
Party	Candidate	Votes	%
Democratic	Kevin Riley (incumbent)	5,882	81.7
Democratic	Pamela A. Hamilton-Johnson	902	12.5
Democratic	Aisha Hernandez Ahmed	396	5.5
Write-in		20	0.3
Total votes		7,200	100.0

2023 New York City Council election, District 12
Party	Candidate	Votes	%
Democratic	Kevin Riley (incumbent)	9,557	92.8
Republican	Dewayne R. Lee	692	6.7
Write-in		54	0.5
Total votes		10,303	100.0
Democratic hold			

=== 2021 ===
2021 New York City Council Democratic primary, District 12
Party	Candidate	Maximum round	Maximum votes	Share in maximum round	Maximum votes First round votes Transfer votes
Democratic	Kevin Riley (incumbent)	3	9,595	59.1%	
Democratic	Pamela A. Hamilton-Johnson	3	6,643	40.9%	
Democratic	Shanequa Moore	2	3,660	21.1%	
Write-In		1	209	1.2%	

2021 New York City Council election, District 12
Party	Candidate	Votes	%
Democratic	Kevin Riley (incumbent)	17,959	99.6
Write-in		80	0.4
Total votes		18,039	100.0
Democratic hold			

=== 2020 ===
2020 New York City's 12th City Council district special election
Party	Candidate	Votes	%
Justice & Unity	Kevin Riley	4,879	68.1
Social Change	Pamela A. Hamilton-Johnson	1,747	24.4
Write-in		299	4.2
Bronx 12 Matters	Neville Mitchell	236	3.3
Total votes		7,161	100.0
Democratic hold			
