= Sisters of Life =

Roman Catholic religious congregation for women

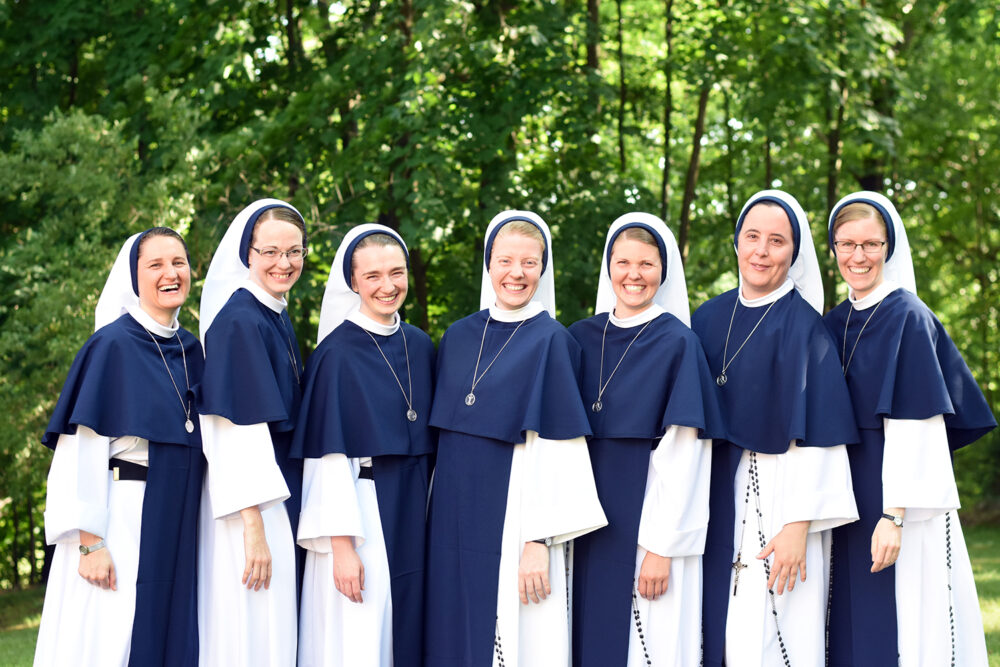
Sisters of Life in New York

The Sisters of Life (Latin: Sorores Vitæ) is a Catholic religious institute for women that follows the Augustinian rule. It is both a contemplative and active religious community, working in North America for the promotion of anti-abortion causes. Its members use the post-nominal abbreviation S.V.

== Origins ==
The Sisters of Life were an order first conceived of by Cardinal John Joseph O'Connor of New York, on a visit to the remains of a Nazi concentration camp at Dachau, Germany. There he placed his hands inside a crematoria oven, "felt the intermingled ashes of Jew and Christian, rabbi, priest and minister", and is recorded as proclaiming, "Good God, how could human beings do this to other human beings?"

Several years later, he decided to begin a new religious community in the Church, one dedicated to the promotion of pro-life causes, specifically working for an end to abortion and euthanasia. He proclaimed his intentions in an article entitled "Help Wanted: Sisters of Life", written in 1989 for the newspaper Catholic New York, in which he asked for women of higher education to especially consider joining. Many women responded to the article, and on Foundation Day, June 1, 1991, eight women joined the order. For thirteen years they remained a public association of the lay faithful—a non-religious Catholic community—until March 25, 2004, when they were formally established as a religious institute of diocesan right by Edward Michael Egan, Cardinal and Archbishop Emeritus of New York. The first Superior General of the order was Mother Agnes Mary Donovan.

== Vows and activities ==
Like all Catholic religious communities, the Sisters of Life take the three traditional religious vows of poverty, chastity and obedience. The Sisters of Life take an additional fourth vow to "protect and enhance the sacredness of human life". They spend 4 hours a day in common prayer before the Blessed Sacrament, including a daily Holy Hour consisting of the Rosary, 45 minutes of meditation and Vespers. Their daily work includes their aid and support to pregnant women at Saint Peter's Church in Toronto, Canada, and Holy Respite in New York.

They run retreats entitled "Enter Canaan" to aid women who have had abortions in finding emotional and spiritual peace. At the request of Cardinal Edward Michael Egan, the Sisters of Life began directing the New York Archdiocesan Family Life/Respect Life Office, which organizes anti-abortion initiatives in the archdiocese. They house the Dr. Joseph Stanton Human Life Issues Library, an archive of legal, medical and catechetical anti-abortion literature, in their New York convent.

== Visitation Mission ==
The Visitation Mission, considered the order's primary work, serves women experiencing unintended pregnancy, and seeks to provide them with both "emotional and practical resources" to give birth. While half of those counseled by the Visitation Mission remain at home, others are placed in private homes or maternity facilities run by other religious orders, or with the Sisters of Life themselves, in the Convent of the Sacred Heart in Hell's Kitchen, Manhattan, where women can stay "as long as six months prior to giving birth and up to a year afterward". The Sisters of Life rely on donations of food, diapers, strollers and money to run their Visitation Mission, and serve over 1,000 women a year in person, over phone and by email.

== Villa Maria Guadalupe ==
The Sisters of Life run a retreat house in Stamford, Connecticut, called Villa Maria Guadalupe. Formerly operated by the Bernardine Franciscan Sisters, the property was purchased by the Knights of Columbus for the Sisters of Life, with the hope that the sisters' ministry would "help people from around the world to deepen their spiritual life and commitment to live the challenge of being a people for life".

== Convents ==
The Sisters of Life have two convents in Toronto and several convents in New York: St. Paul the Apostle Convent, Sacred Heart of Jesus Convent, St. Barnabas Convent and St. Frances de Chantal Convent, where about 140 sisters live in communities.
