= St. Barnabas' Church (Bronx) =

Catholic parish church in New York, US

Coordinates: 40°54′7.5″N 73°51′55″W

The Church of St. Barnabas
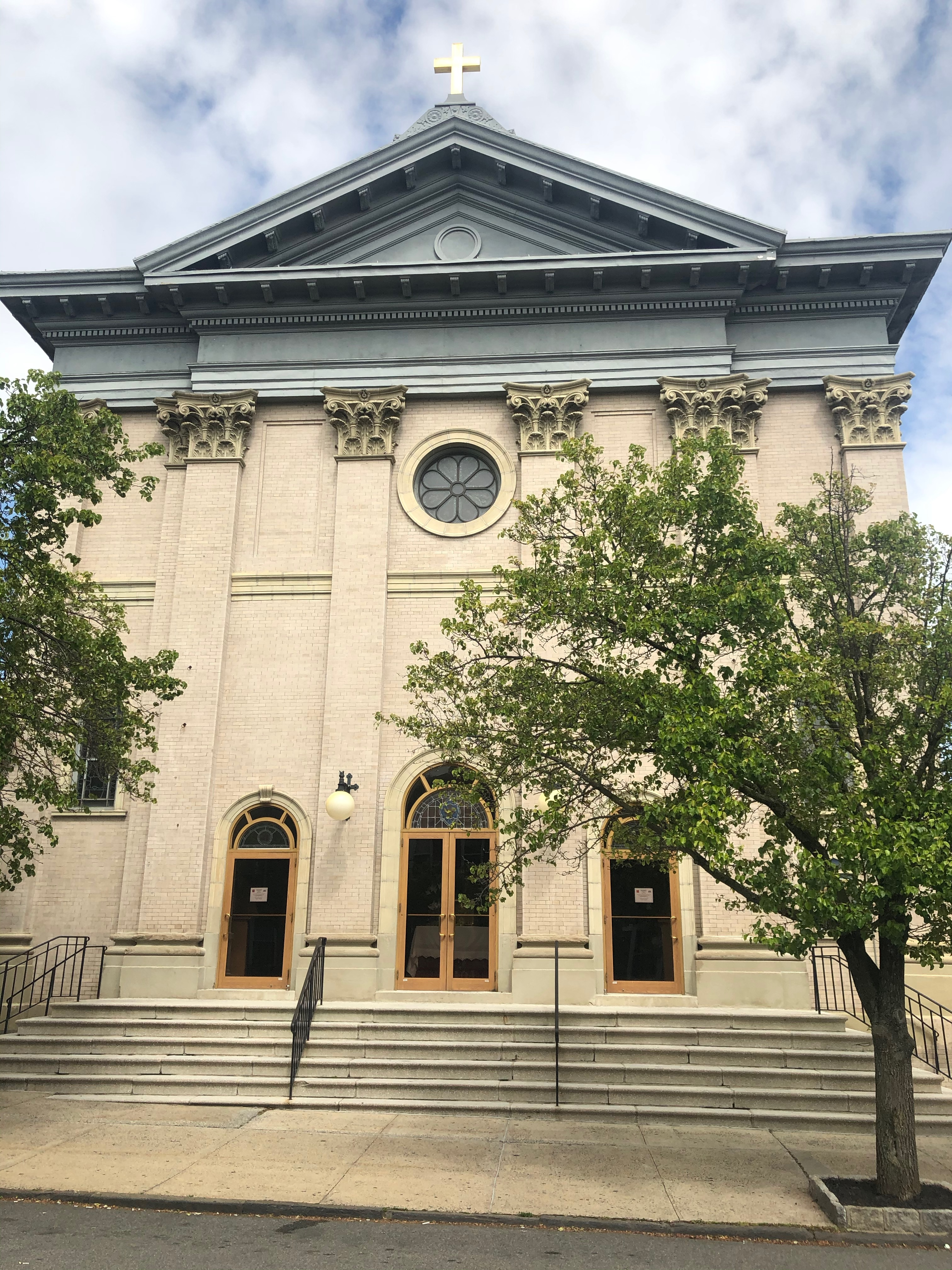

General information
- Architectural style: Italianate
- Location: Woodlawn Heights, The Bronx, New York City, United States
- Completed: 1911
- Client: Roman Catholic Archdiocese of New York

The Church of St. Barnabas is a Roman Catholic parish church under the authority of the Roman Catholic Archdiocese of New York, located at Martha Avenue near East 241st Street in Woodlawn Heights, The Bronx, New York City. The parish was established in July 1910 by Michael A. Reilly, separated from the Bronx parish of St. Frances of Rome. It is one of the largest parishes in the archdiocese.

== Buildings ==
The church building was built 1911. The Italianate church was dedicated by Cardinal John M. Farley, the Archbishop of New York, in November 1911. When opened, it accommodated 700 people. A temporary school was opened in 1911, with 200 students, staffed by seven Sisters of Charity of New York. Opposite the church, a convent for the Sisters was opened in January 1913 at a cost of $8,000 (which in 1914 still had a debt of $5,500). Prior to that, the Sisters had to travel daily from their motherhouse in Riverdale. In 1914, the parish numbered around 1,000, and the property was valued at $100,000, with a debt of $59,500.

The chapel and high school, which opened in 1924, were rebuilt during the pastorship of George McWeeney (1947–1965). During the 1980s, up to 22 Masses were celebrated in the parish each week. The rectory, parish center and high school chapel were renovated during the pastorate of Timothy S. Collins (1986–1994).

== Music ==
The church has had at least four organs over its 100-year history. The first was installed by the Estey Organ Company of Brattleboro, Vermont around 1911. The second was created by George S. Hutchings of Boston, Massachusetts in 1890, installed around 1948 and restored in 1988. The third was installed by Jaeckel Organs, Inc. of Duluth, Minnesota in 1985. The Peragallo Pipe Organ Company of Paterson, New Jersey installed the present organ in 2009.

== Parish Schools ==
St. Barnabas Elementary School, founded in 1911, is located at 413 East 241st Street, Bronx, New York, 10470. The school offers grades from pre-kindergarten (pre-K) to 8th grade. Jonathan Morano has served as Principal since 2015 and Stephen Marositz has served as Vice Principal since 2018.

St. Barnabas High School, founded in 1924, is located at 425 East 240th Street, Bronx, New York, 10470. It is an all-girls Catholic parish school that offers a college prep program to young women in Grades 9–12.

During the 1980s, there were more than 1500 students enrolled in the parish elementary school and 800 enrolled in the high school. The high school has since been independent from the parish as of September 2015.

== Pastors ==
- 1910-1947: Michael A. Reilly (1873–1947), the first pastor was the New York City-born Reilly, who graduated from St. Francis Xavier's College and Dunwoodie Seminary. He was ordained in 1898 and served as assistant at St. Peter's Church (Poughkeepsie, New York) until being transferred to the New York Apostolate in 1902 where he remained until 1910, when he founded St. Barnabas. Under his pastorship, he built the church, the schools, the convent, and the rectory, and the parish became one of the largest in the archdiocese. Consequently, he was elevated to the position of monsignor and died in 1947.
- 1947-1965: George McWeeney, erected the new high school building and chapel were erected.
- 1965-1986: John J. Considine
- 1986-1994: Timothy S. Collins, transferred to become pastor of Our Lady of the Rosary Church, Manhattan (The Mother Seton Shrine).
- 1994-2003: Francis X. Toner, reorganized parish services and served until his death.
- 2003–2015: Edward M. Barry
- 2015–Present: Brendan Fitzgerald
