= Bronx Community Board 12 =

Bronx Community District 12 Bronx Community Board 12
- Community District
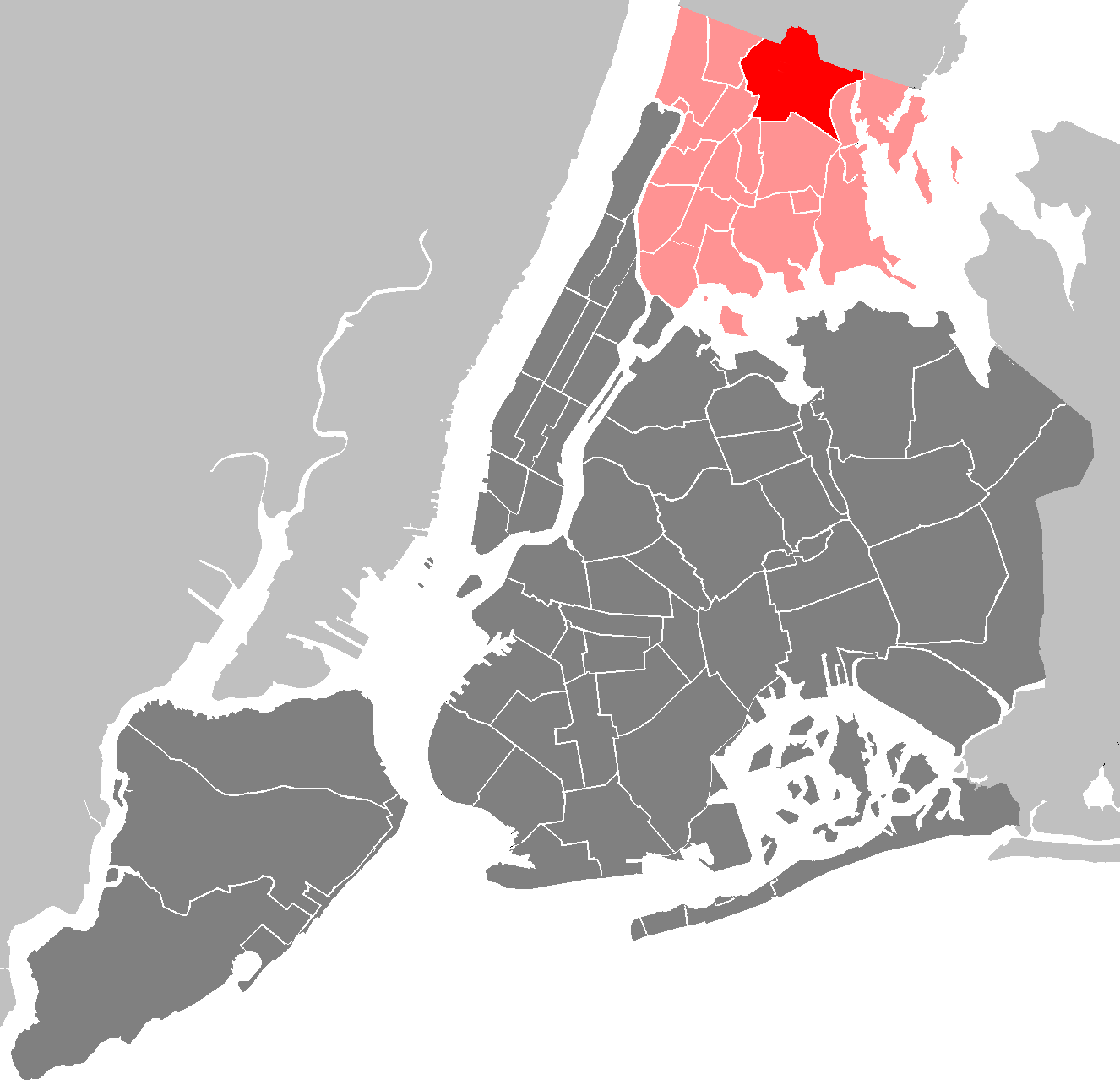
- Location in The Bronx
- Country: United States
- State: New York
- City: New York City
- Borough: The Bronx
- Neighborhoods: list: Bronx Manor; Edenwald; Olinville; Baychester; Eastchester; Fish Bay; Williamsbridge; Wakefield; Woodlawn

Government
  - Type: Community board
  - Body: Bronx Community Board 12
  - Chairperson: Beatriz Coronel
  - District Manager: George Torres

Area
  - Total: 5.6 sq mi (15 km^{2})

Population (2000)
  - Total: 149,077
  - Density: 27,000/sq mi (10,000/km^{2})

Ethnicity
  - Hispanic and Latino Americans: 18.5%
  - African-American: 65.9%
  - White: 10%
  - Asian: %
  - Others: 0.3%
  - American Indian or Alaska Native: 0.2%
- Time zone: UTC−5 (Eastern)
  - Summer (DST): UTC−4 (EDT)
- ZIP codes: 10460, 10466, 10467, 10469, 10470, and 10475
- Area codes: 718, 347, and 929, and 917
- Police Precincts: 47th (website)
- Website: www1.nyc.gov/site/bronxcb12/index.page

Bronx Community Board 12 is a local government unit of the New York City borough of the Bronx, encompassing the neighborhoods of Edenwald, Wakefield, Williamsbridge, Woodlawn Heights, Fish Bay, Eastchester, Olinville and Baychester.

It is delimited by Van Cortlandt Park East and Jerome Avenue to the west, Adee Avenue and Gun Hill Road East to the south, the New England Thruway to the east and the Westchester County border to the north.

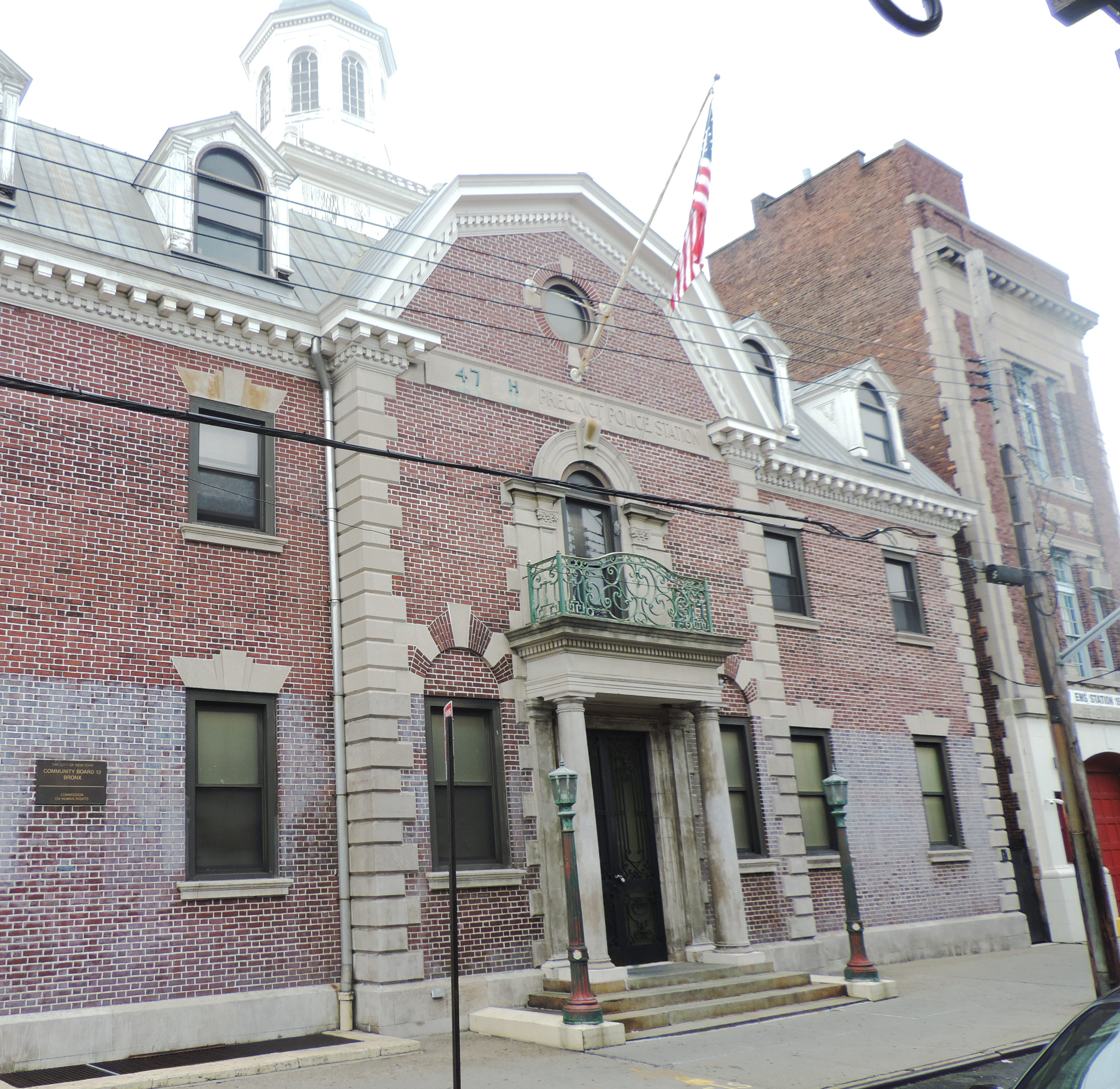
Bronx Community Board 12 office

== Community board staff and membership ==
The current chairperson of the Bronx Community board 12 is Dr. Michael Burke. Its District Manager is George Torres.

The City Council members representing the community district are non-voting, ex officio board members. The council members and their council districts are:

- 11th NYC Council District - Eric Dinowitz
- 12th NYC Council District - Kevin Riley
- 13th NYC Council District - Mark Gjonaj
- 15th NYC Council District - Ritchie Torres

== Demographics ==
In 2020, the district's population was 163,489, up from 152,344 in 2010. Black non-Hispanics made up 60.6% (98,995 persons) of the district's population in 2020. That same year, the Hispanic/ Latino population was 44,168 (27%), the White non-Hispanic population was 9,347 (5.7%), and the Asian non-Hispanic population was 3,440 (2.1%).

== Board Meetings ==
The Bronx Community 12 Board typically meets on the fourth Thursday of each month at 7:30pm at the Town Hall, 4101 White Plains Road, Bronx, New York 10466. Meeting times can be viewed on the official website; citizens can contact the office directly to learn about upcoming meetings that have not been updated to the website.
