= Peragallo Pipe Organ Company =

The Peragallo Pipe Organ Company of Paterson, New Jersey, United States, was founded in 1918 by John Peragallo Sr., who, prior to founding the company, apprenticed with the E.M. Skinner Organ Company (now Aeolian-Skinner). A family company, Peragallo Pipe Organ Company was run by Peragallo Sr., and then by John Peragallo Jr. until his death in 2008. The company now is headed by John III and Frank Peragallo, joined by their sons, John IV and Anthony.

The company builds, tunes, and repairs pipe organs, and is notable for being the curator of the organ at St. Patrick's Cathedral, New York, as well as a restorer at the Church of St. Paul the Apostle (New York City), and the organbuilder for St. Barnabas' Church (Bronx, New York).
