= Vincent Marchiselli =

American politician (1928–2013)

- Born: Vincent Andrew Marchiselli; August 18, 1928; The Bronx, New York, U.S.
- Died: November 29, 2013 (aged 85)
- Resting place: Gate of Heaven Cemetery, Westchester, New York, U.S.
- Occupation: Politician

Vincent Andrew Marchiselli (August 18, 1928 – November 29, 2013) was a Democratic member of the New York State Assembly from the Bronx, New York. He was born in The Bronx, New York.

== Life ==
Before getting involved in politics, Marchiselli was president of his own funeral home, Marchiselli Funeral Homes, in the Bronx. Marchiselli first ran for office in 1970, but lost the Democratic primary for Assembly in the 86th district to incumbent Anthony J. Stella. In 1974, Marchiselli was elected to the New York State Assembly, defeating Republican Victor B. Tosi in a competitive race. Marchiselli was a member of the Assembly from 1975 to 1984, sitting in the 181st, 182nd, 183rd, 184th and 185th New York State Legislatures. Marchiselli was affiliated with the "reform wing" of Bronx Democrats, who included then-Assemblymen Oliver Koppell and Eliot Engel. The "reform" Democrats in the Bronx often clashed with the "regular" Democrats who strongly supported the powerful Bronx Democratic County political machine and its chairmen such as Charles A. Buckley, Patrick Cunningham and Stanley M. Friedman. Although liberal on most issues, Marchiselli, a devout Catholic, was pro-life on abortion and supported tax credits for parents who send their children to private schools.

In 1984, after his district's boundaries were redrawn, Marchiselli was narrowly defeated in the Democratic primary for the 82nd Assembly district by Larry Seabrook. Marchiselli attempted to regain his seat in 1986, but was once again defeated by Seabrook in the primary.

In 1988, Marchiselli ran for Congress, seeking the seat held by Mario Biaggi, who was convicted on corruption charges. Marchiselli finished a distant second in the primary behind Assemblyman Eliot Engel. (Biaggi, who remained on the ballot, narrowly finished third despite not waging an active campaign.) In 1989, Marchiselli crossed party lines and backed Republican Rudy Giuliani in the race for mayor. Four years later, Marchiselli once again backed Giuliani and was a prominent member of "Democrats for Giuliani."

When he was three years old, Marchiselli was stricken with polio. Marchiselli used a wheelchair for the rest of his life.

Vincent Marchiselli died of a heart attack on November 29, 2013, at Lawrence Hospital, Bronxville, New York.

New York State Assembly
Preceded by Anthony J. Stella	New York State Assembly; 86th District; 1975–1982	Succeeded by Richard L. Brodsky
Preceded by Sean P. Walsh	New York State Assembly; 82nd District; 1983–1984	Succeeded by Larry Seabrook
