= Woodlawn Heights, Bronx =

Neighborhood in New York City

Woodlawn Heights
- Neighborhood of the Bronx
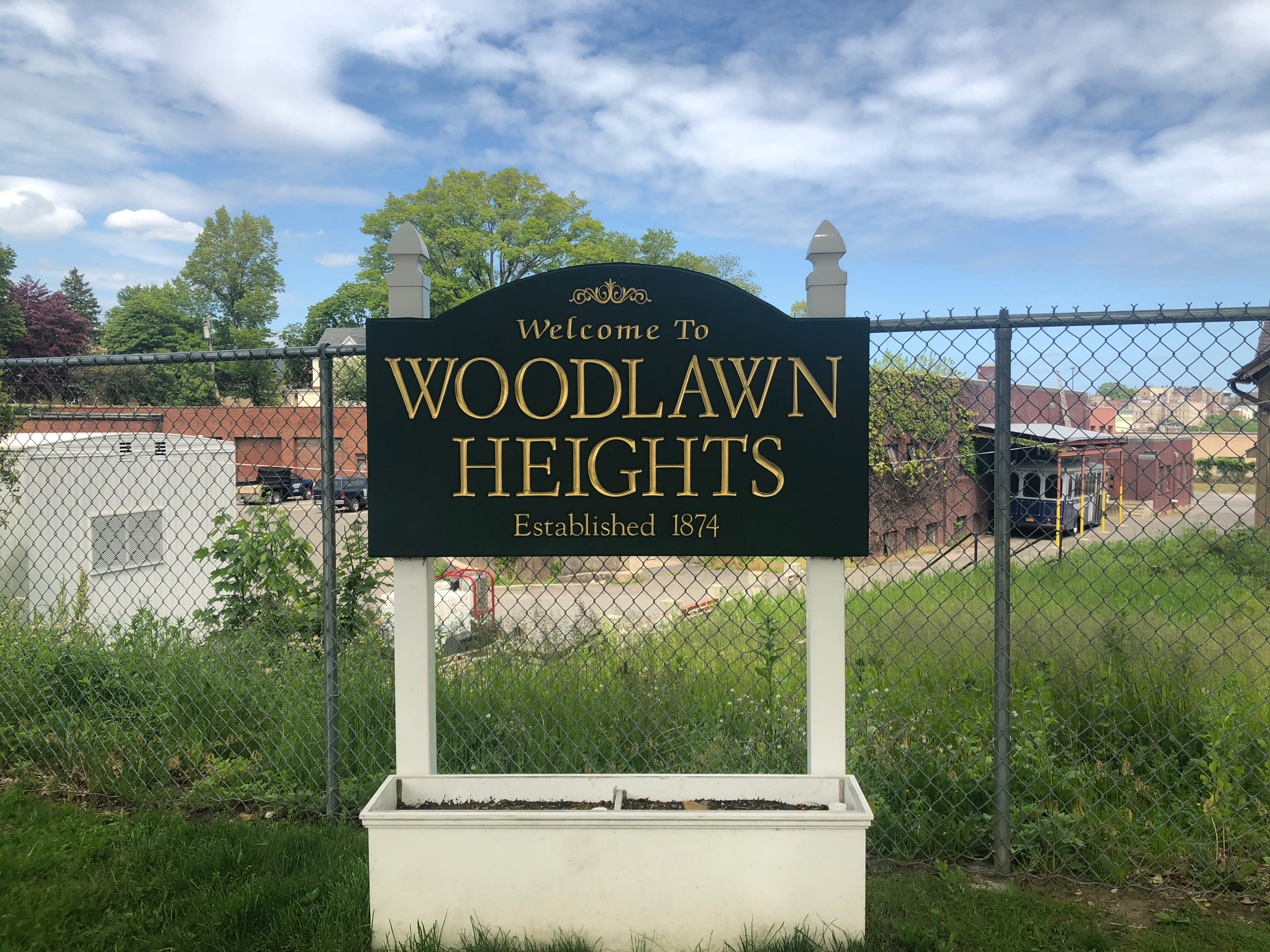
- "Welcome to Woodlawn Heights" sign.
- Nickname: "Little Ireland"
- Location in New York City
- Coordinates: 40.898°N 73.867°W
- Country: United States
- State: New York
- City: New York City
- Borough: The Bronx
- Community District: Bronx 12

Area
  - Total: 0.240 sq mi (0.62 km^{2})

Population (2020)
  - Total: 7,985
  - Density: 33,300/sq mi (12,800/km^{2})

Economics
  - Median income: $52,510
- ZIP Codes: 10470
- Area code: 718, 347, 929, and 917
- Website: www.nyctourism.com/new-york/the-bronx/woodlawn/

Woodlawn Heights, also known as Woodlawn, is a predominantly Irish-American working class neighborhood at the very north end of the borough of the Bronx in New York City. It is bounded by McLean Avenue to the north (slightly north of New York City's border with the city of Yonkers in Westchester County), the Bronx River to the east, Woodlawn Cemetery to the south, and Van Cortlandt Park to the west. Woodlawn Heights remains one of the few areas in New York City that still has young Irish immigrants arriving to the area en masse.

Woodlawn Heights is part of Bronx Community Board 12, and its ZIP Code is 10470.

== Major streets ==
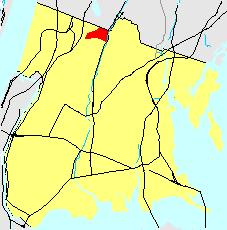
Location of Woodlawn in the Bronx

Katonah Avenue, which runs north–south through the heart of Woodlawn Heights, is a popular destination for its many Irish pubs and restaurants. In addition, there is The Emerald Isle Immigration Center, an Italian bakery, an Italian restaurant, an Irish butcher shop, Irish and Albanian barber shops, and many other types of specialty shops.

McLean Avenue, which runs east–west, is the main shopping strip for both Woodlawn Heights and the Yonkers neighborhood of McLean Heights. Its pubs and shops are considered to be some of the neighborhood's most notable fixtures, although technically it is within the city of Yonkers. McLean Avenue has many Irish pubs, a large variety of Irish and non-Irish restaurants and diners, two Irish gift shops, The Aisling Irish Community Center, an Irish butcher shop, and Italian pastry shop.

East 233rd Street is a major thoroughfare that runs east–west on the southern border of the neighborhood. It is largely known for its gas stations and Irish pubs, as well as for its bus routes and the Woodlawn station of the Metro-North Railroad.

Notable features of the neighborhood include Oneida Triangle, a memorial to residents of Woodlawn Heights who served in World War I, and Muskrat Cove, the northernmost segment of the Bronx River Greenway.

== Demographics ==
Based on data from the 2010 United States census, the population of Woodlawn-Wakefield was 42,483, a decrease of 1,100 (2.5%) from the 43,583 counted in 2000. Covering an area of 901.76 acres (364.93 ha), the neighborhood had a population density of 47.1 inhabitants per acre (30,100/sq mi; 11,600/km^{2}). The racial makeup of the neighborhood was 17.6% (7,473) White, 58.3% (24,774) African American, 0.4% (169) Native American, 3.4% (1,465) Asian, 0.0% (20) Pacific Islander, 2.0% (855) from other races, and 2.0% (866) from two or more races. Hispanic or Latino of any race were 16.1% (6,861) of the population.

Historically a German neighborhood, Woodlawn Heights is now a mostly Irish American neighborhood, which also has a small but recognizable Italian-American community. This neighborhood remains one of the few communities to which young and newly arrived Irish immigrants regularly arrive en masse. The Emerald Isle Immigration Center on Katonah Avenue and the Aisling Irish Community Center on McLean Avenue are two sources for the newly arrived as well as established Irish immigrants to Woodlawn Heights and the United States. The neighborhood is sometimes informally referred to as "Little Ireland".

The entirety of Community District 12, which comprises Williamsbridge, Woodlawn Heights, Baychester, and Eastchester, had 156,542 inhabitants as of NYC Health's 2018 Community Health Profile, with an average life expectancy of 81.0 years. This is about the same as the median life expectancy of 81.2 for all New York City neighborhoods. Most inhabitants are youth and middle-aged adults: 24% are between the ages of between 0–17, 27% between 25 and 44, and 26% between 45 and 64. The ratio of college-aged and elderly residents was lower, at 10% and 13% respectively.

As of 2017, the median household income in Community District 12 was $48,018. In 2018, an estimated 22% of Woodlawn Heights and Williamsbridge residents lived in poverty, compared to 25% in all of the Bronx and 20% in all of New York City. One in eight residents (13%) were unemployed, compared to 13% in the Bronx and 9% in New York City. Rent burden, or the percentage of residents who have difficulty paying their rent, is 57% in Woodlawn Heights and Williamsbridge, compared to the boroughwide and citywide rates of 58% and 51% respectively. Based on this calculation, as of 2018, Woodlawn Heights and Williamsbridge are considered high-income relative to the rest of the city and not gentrifying.

== Police and crime ==
Woodlawn Heights and Williamsbridge are patrolled by the 47th Precinct of the NYPD, located at 4111 Laconia Avenue. The 47th Precinct ranked 35th safest out of 69 patrol areas for per-capita crime in 2010. As of 2018, with a non-fatal assault rate of 82 per 100,000 people, Woodlawn Heights and Williamsbridge's rate of violent crimes per capita is more than that of the city as a whole. The incarceration rate of 577 per 100,000 people is higher than that of the city as a whole.

The 47th Precinct has a lower crime rate than in the 1990s, with crimes across all categories having decreased by 60.9% between 1990 and 2022. The precinct reported 16 murders, 45 rapes, 461 robberies, 732 felony assaults, 300 burglaries, 758 grand larcenies, and 461 grand larcenies auto in 2022.

== Fire safety ==
Woodlawn Heights is served by the New York City Fire Department (FDNY)'s Engine Co. 63/Ladder Co. 39/Battalion 15, located at 755 East 233rd Street.

== Health ==
As of 2018, preterm births and births to teenage mothers are more common in Woodlawn Heights and Williamsbridge than in other places citywide. In Woodlawn Heights and Williamsbridge, there were 102 preterm births per 1,000 live births (compared to 87 per 1,000 citywide), and 24 births to teenage mothers per 1,000 live births (compared to 19.3 per 1,000 citywide). Woodlawn Heights and Williamsbridge has a low population of residents who are uninsured. In 2018, this population of uninsured residents was estimated to be 8%, lower than the citywide rate of 12%.

The concentration of fine particulate matter, the deadliest type of air pollutant, in Woodlawn Heights and Williamsbridge is 0.0075 milligrams per cubic metre (7.5×10^{−9} oz/ft^{3}), the same as the city average. Eleven percent of Woodlawn Heights and Williamsbridge residents are smokers, which is lower than the city average of 14% of residents being smokers. In Woodlawn Heights and Williamsbridge, 30% of residents are obese, 14% are diabetic, and 39% have high blood pressure—compared to the citywide averages of 24%, 11%, and 28% respectively. In addition, 24% of children are obese, compared to the citywide average of 20%.

Eighty-eight percent of residents eat some fruits and vegetables every day, which is about the same as the city's average of 87%. In 2018, 78% of residents described their health as "good", "very good", or "excellent", equal to the city's average of 78%. For every supermarket in Woodlawn Heights and Williamsbridge, there are 8 bodegas.

The nearest large hospitals are Montefiore Medical Center and North Central Bronx Hospital, both located in Norwood. In addition, Montefiore Medical Center's Wakefield Campus is located in Williamsbridge.

== Post office and ZIP Code ==
Woodlawn Heights is located within the ZIP Code 10470. The United States Postal Service operates the Woodlawn Station at 4364 Katonah Avenue.

== Education ==
Woodlawn Heights and Williamsbridge generally have a lower rate of college-educated residents than the rest of the city as of 2018. While 32% of residents age 25 and older have a college education or higher, 20% have less than a high school education and 48% are high school graduates or have some college education. By contrast, 26% of Bronx residents and 43% of city residents have a college education or higher. The percentage of Woodlawn Heights and Williamsbridge students excelling in math rose from 32% in 2000 to 48% in 2011, though reading achievement remained constant at 37% during the same time period.

Woodlawn Heights and Williamsbridge's rate of elementary school student absenteeism is slightly higher than the rest of New York City. In Woodlawn Heights and Williamsbridge, 29% of elementary school students missed twenty or more days per school year, more than the citywide average of 20%. Additionally, 70% of high school students in Woodlawn Heights and Williamsbridge graduate on time, about the same as the citywide average of 75%.

=== Schools ===
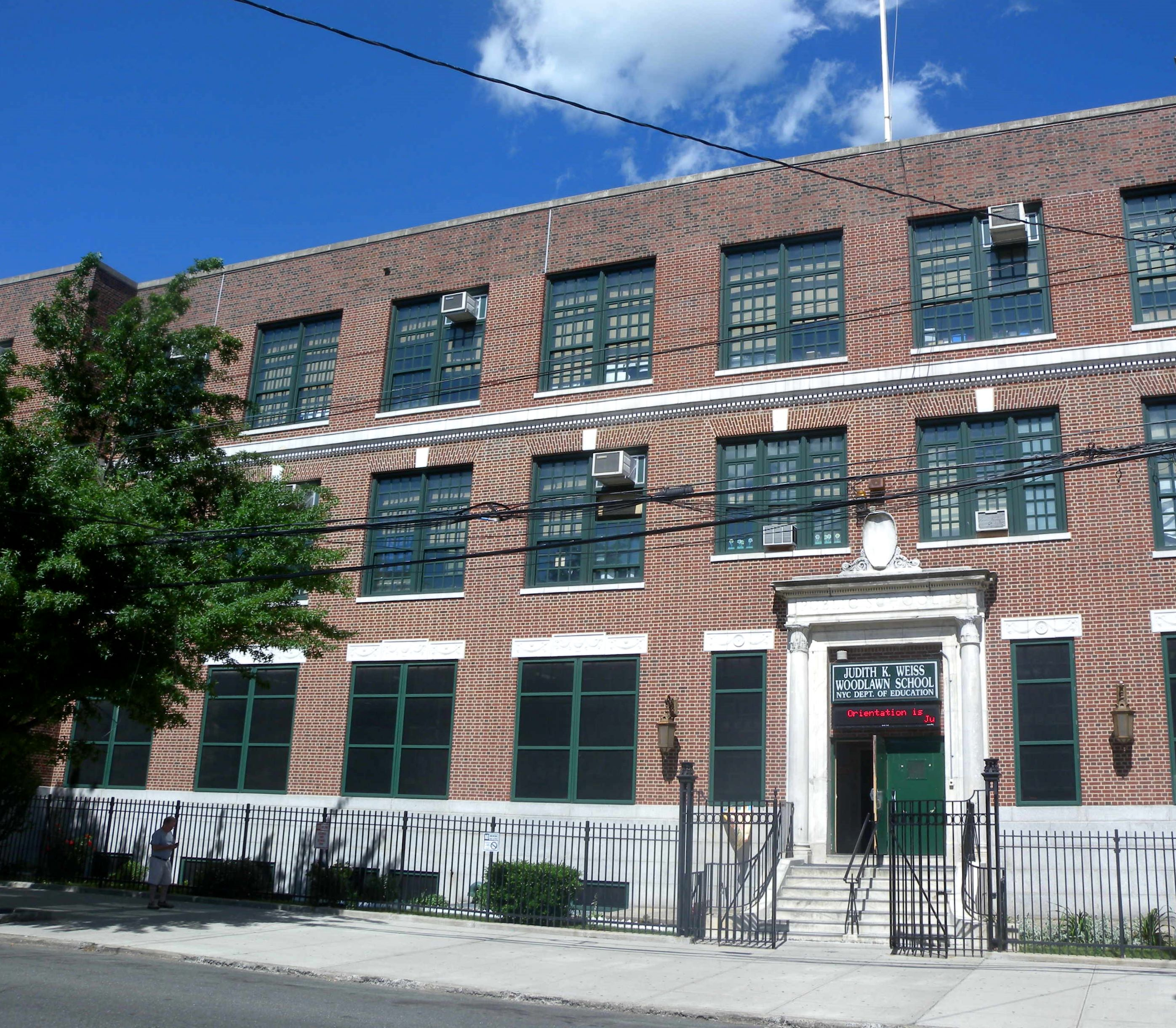
PS 19, Katonah Avenue

The St. Barnabas parish runs St. Barnabas Elementary School, which opened in 1914 (whose principal is currently Miranda Marques). St. Barnabas High School, an all-girls school which opened in 1928 is run by principal Henry Triana. The high school has since been independent from the parish as of September 2015. In addition to the aforementioned St. Barnabas parish schools, the neighborhood is served by Judith K. Weiss School P.S. 19.

=== Library ===
The New York Public Library (NYPL)'s Woodlawn Heights branch is located at 4355 Katonah Avenue. The branch opened in 1931 and moved to its current one-story, 2,500-square-foot (230 m^{2}) location in 1969. The Woodlawn Heights branch contains an extensive collection of Irish books.

== Community and civic organizations ==
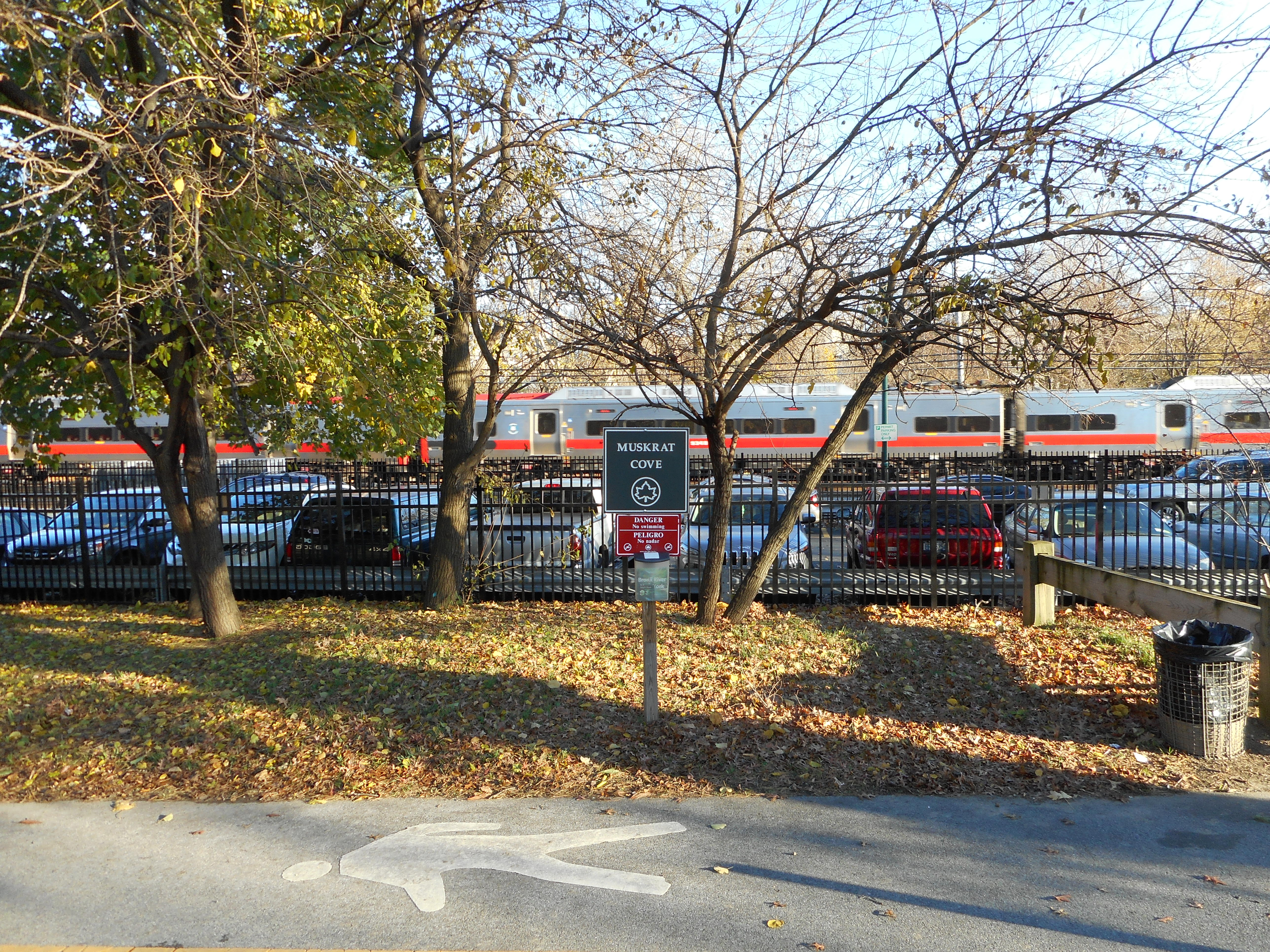
Muskrat Cove, a local park between the Woodlawn station and the southbound off-ramp from the Bronx River Parkway to East 233rd Street

Woodlawn has numerous community and civic organizations.

- Bronx Community Board 12 holds general meetings monthly, and committee meetings ad hoc.
- 47th Precinct Community Council comprises monthly meetings with members of community and representatives from the NYPD.
- The Woodlawn Library Support Group meets at the Woodlawn Heights branch of the New York Public Library located at 4355 Katonah Ave, Bronx, NY 10470.
- The Woodlawn Taxpayers & Community Association was established in 1865 and is a not-for-profit community organization that works to service the needs of the neighborhood.
- The Woodlawn Collective is a partnership operating in Woodlawn.

== Places of worship ==
The Roman Catholic church of St. Barnabas is the largest church in Woodlawn Heights and part of St. Barnabas parish. The parish is managed by Reverend Brendan A. Fitzgerald. The parish has weekly masses in English and Italian and some seasonal holiday masses in Irish. St. Barnabas Parish, founded in 1910, serves as a major community center for the neighborhood, which is nearly entirely Catholic, and a center of Irish culture, offering Irish language classes and an Irish Outreach program to assist Irish immigrants in finding jobs and residence in the neighborhood. In addition to the church, the parish runs an adjoining convent (currently occupied by the large and growing community of the Sisters of Life) and St. Barnabas Elementary School.

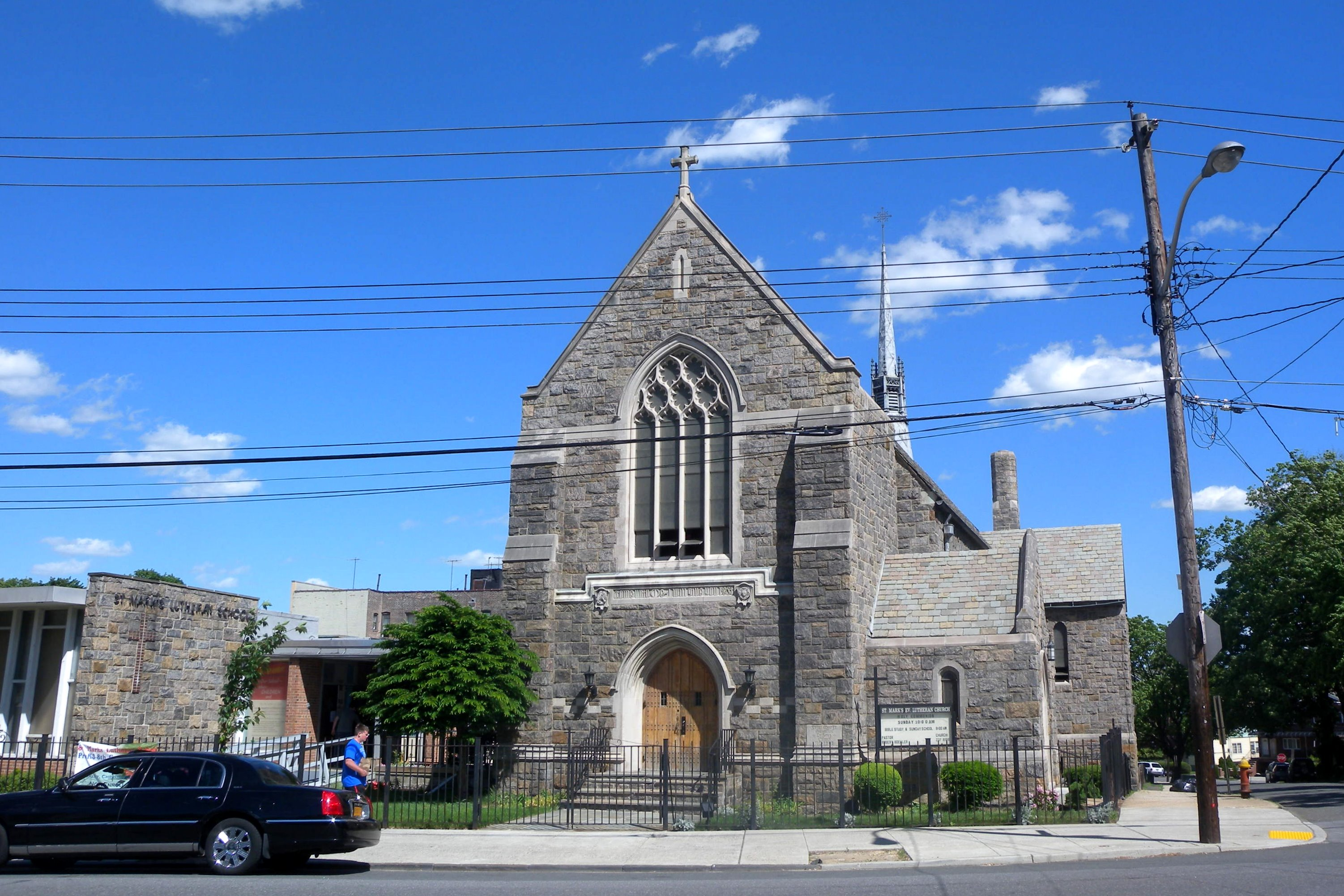
St. Mark's Lutheran Church

St. Mark's Lutheran Church is on Saint Marks Place in Yonkers near the Van Cortlandt Park entrance.

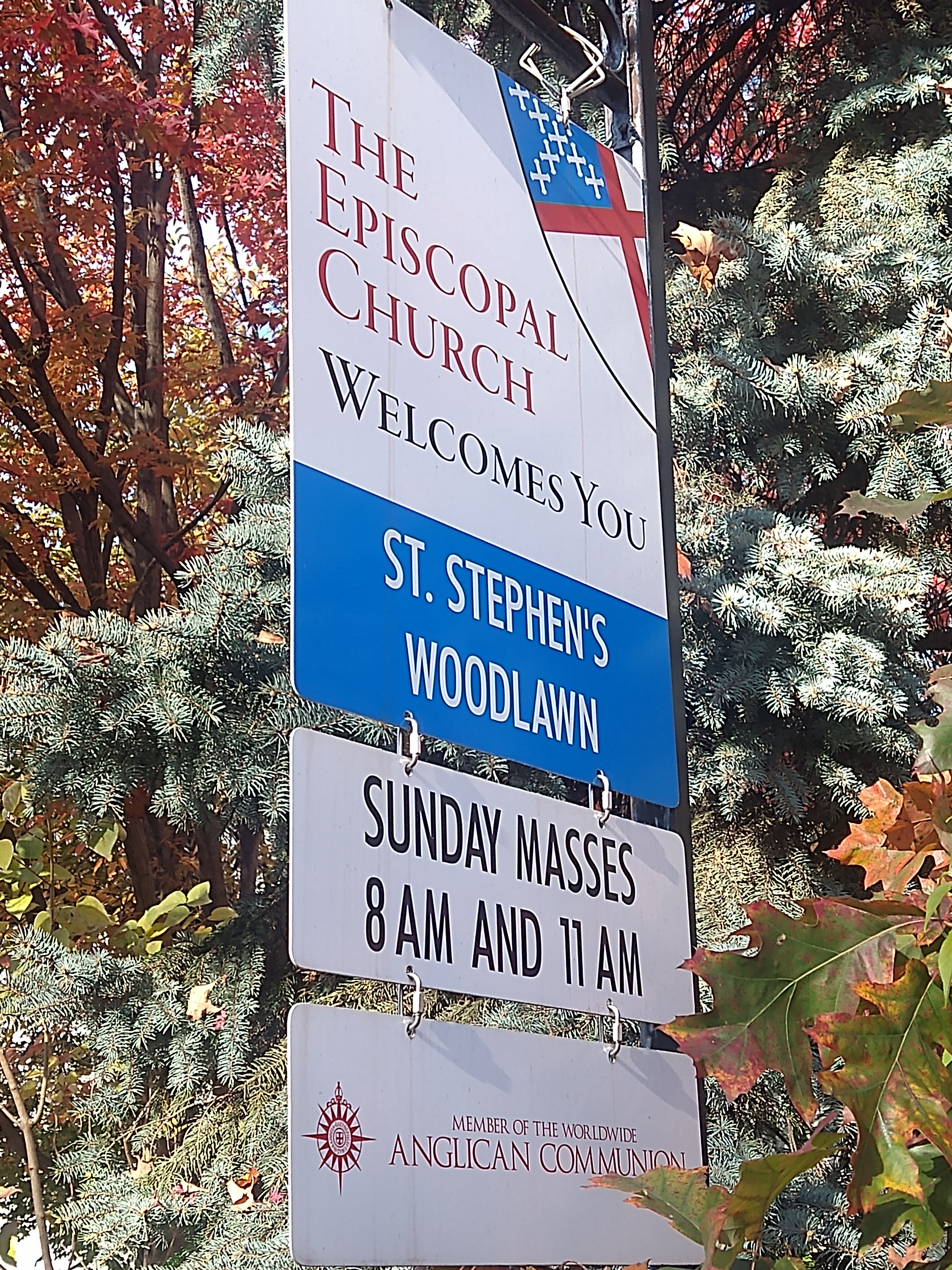
St. Stephen's Woodlawn

St. Stephen's Episcopal Church is located on E. 238th Street at the corner of Vireo Avenue. It is the oldest church in Woodlawn and a member of the world-wide Anglican Communion.

== Transportation ==
Woodlawn Heights is served by the Bx16, Bx31, Bx34 and BxM4 buses operated by MTA Regional Bus Operations; There are currently no New York City Subway routes serving Woodlawn; the Woodlawn station on the IRT Jerome Avenue Line is actually in Norwood. However, commuter rail service does exist in Woodlawn station of the Metro-North Railroad's Harlem Line, providing service to Westchester County and Putnam County as well as Manhattan.

== See also ==
- Irish Americans in New York City
