= John Peragallo Jr. =

American businessman

John Peragallo Jr. (1932–2008) was the president of the Peragallo Pipe Organ Company.
