= Saint Barnabas High School =

Former private all-female Catholic school in the Bronx, New York, United States

Location
- 425 East 240th Street; Woodlawn Heights, The Bronx, New York 10470; United States; 40°54′06″N 73°51′52″W

Information
- Type: Private, all-female
- Motto: Veritas Cum Scientia (Truth with knowledge)
- Religious affiliation: Roman Catholic
- Established: September 1924 (102 years ago)
- Status: Closed
- Closed: June 2024
- Oversight: Sisters of Charity of New York
- School code: 333955
- Principal: Carmen Lopez
- Grades: 9–12
- Colors: Green and gold
- Slogan: Be Charitable, Be Graceful, Be Spirited
- Song: "Saint Barnabas School March Song"
- Athletics: Basketball, golf, soccer, softball, track and field, volleyball
- Mascot: Barney the Bear
- Team name: Bears
- Accreditation: Middle States Association of Colleges and Schools
- Publication: To the Lighthouse (literary journal)
- Newspaper: Saint Barnabas Chronicle
- Yearbook: Immaculata
- Tuition: $9,740 (2023–2024)
- Website: stbarnabashigh.com
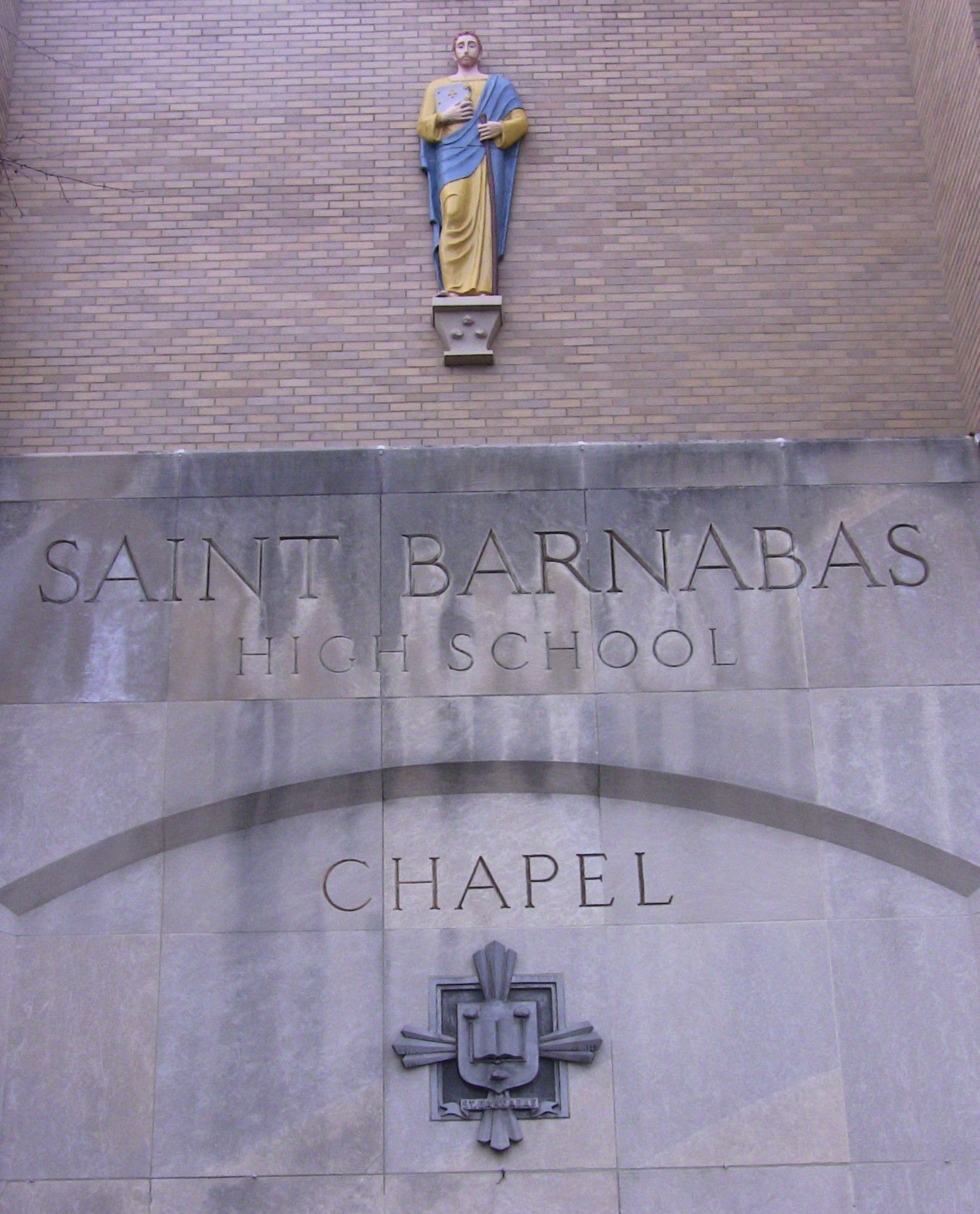
- Saint Barnabas High School chapel facing McLean Avenue (2011)

Saint Barnabas High School was an American all-girls, private, Roman Catholic high school located in the Woodlawn Heights section of the Bronx, New York. It also bordered the southeastern section of the city of Yonkers in neighboring Westchester County.

Founded in 1924, it operated under the authority of the Roman Catholic Archdiocese of New York until its closing in 2024.

== History ==
Founded in September 1924, the school operated at its current location from 1959 until its closing. From its founding, the school was operated by the Sisters of Charity as a service to the members of the Parish of St. Barnabas. As of September 1, 2015, the school became independent of the parish.

The school chapel was renovated sometime during the tenure of Timothy S. Collins as pastor, which lasted from 1986 to 1994.

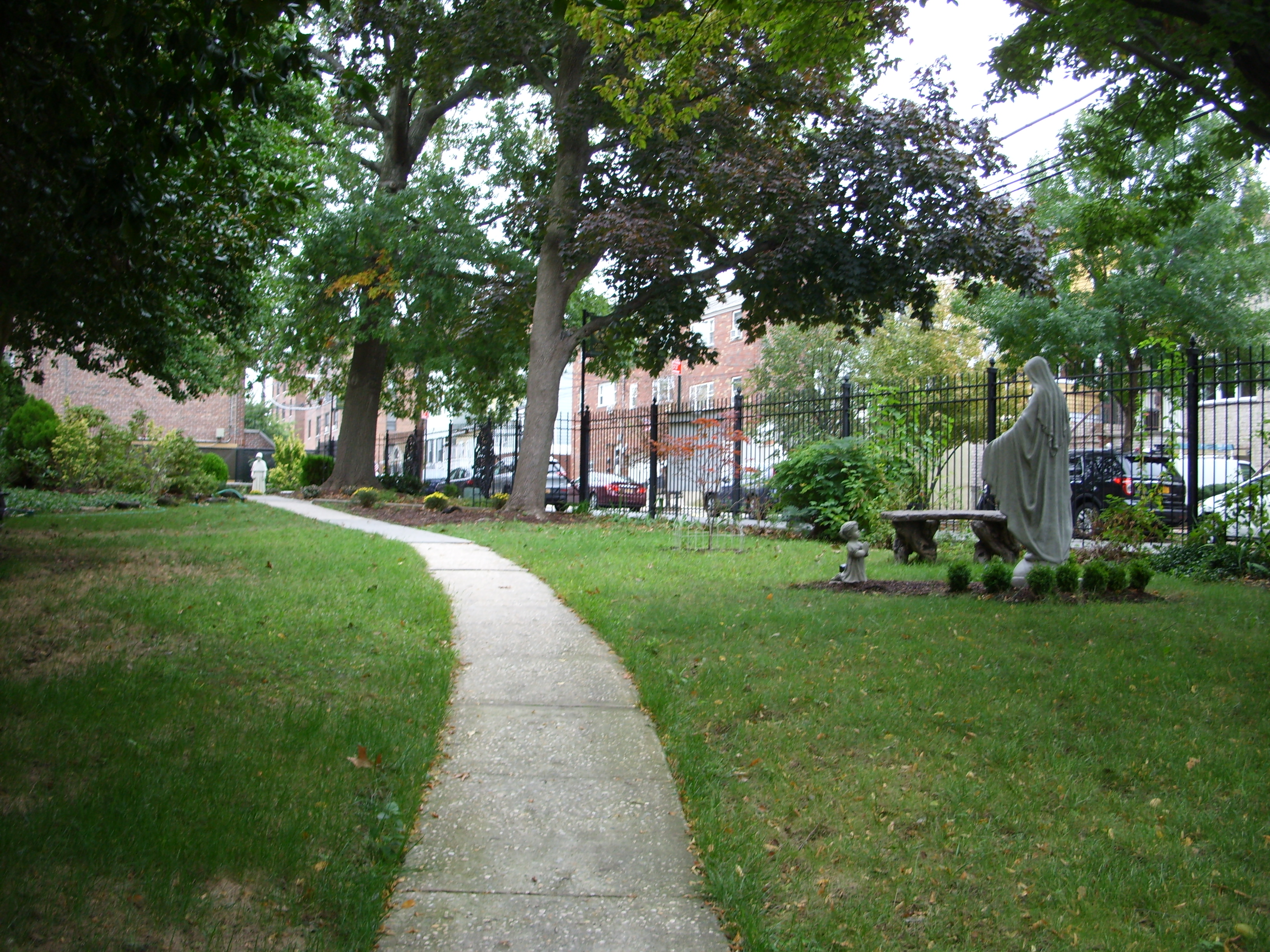
St. Barnabas High School front walkway

== Curriculum ==
The school followed the New York State Department of Education curriculum. Senior electives included psychology and personal finance. The school was accredited by the Middle States Association of Colleges and Schools.

A majority of students went on to colleges or universities.

The class of 2015 amassed nearly $7 million in college scholarships with a 100% graduation rate. As of 2016, the senior class earned over $10 million in scholarship and grants from a vast array of colleges and universities.

Additionally, the school offered Mercy College credits for various courses.

== Performing arts ==
=== Film and drama ===
The school's Film Club was created in 2008. It merged with the existing Drama Club the following year. Together, the Film and Drama Clubs have produced features and short films. Additionally, plays and musicals have been produced by its members.

=== Music ===
The St. Barnabas High School choir and the parish choir collaborated to sing in the Vatican. In 2016, it was the only school and parish in the archdiocese to be invited to sing for Pope Francis during the traditional date of the Epiphany, January 6. In February 2023, the St. Barnabas High School Choir performed at Carnegie Hall for the "Voices in the Hall" program, which highlighted a range of religious music from liturgical, gospel and individual solos with more than 250 vocalists from across the nation participating.

== Athletics ==
The school participated in six sports: basketball, golf, soccer, softball, track and field, and volleyball.

== Extracurricular activities ==
The school had a variety of after-school clubs and activities which include: Albanian Club, Cheerleading, Chess, Choir, Dance (Albanian African, Caribbean, Hip-Hop, Indian, Irish and Spanish), Film and Drama, Italian, La Casa Latina, Math, Art & Anime Club, Nubian Pride, Robotics Club, Shakespeare Competition, Student Ambassadors, Student Council, Student Newspaper, Track Yearbook and marching in the Yonkers St. Patrick's Day Parade.

The school also had academic societies, including the National English Honor Society; Virginia Woolf Chapter, Hispanic National Honor Society; NY Luis Ponce DeLeon Chapter and a National Honor Society; Blanid Stewart Chapter.

== Notable alumnae ==
- Eileen Ivers – musician
- Alice Mayhew – book editor
- Mildred Trouillot – former First Lady of Haiti
