= Wakefield, Bronx =

Neighborhood in New York City

Wakefield
- Neighborhood of the Bronx
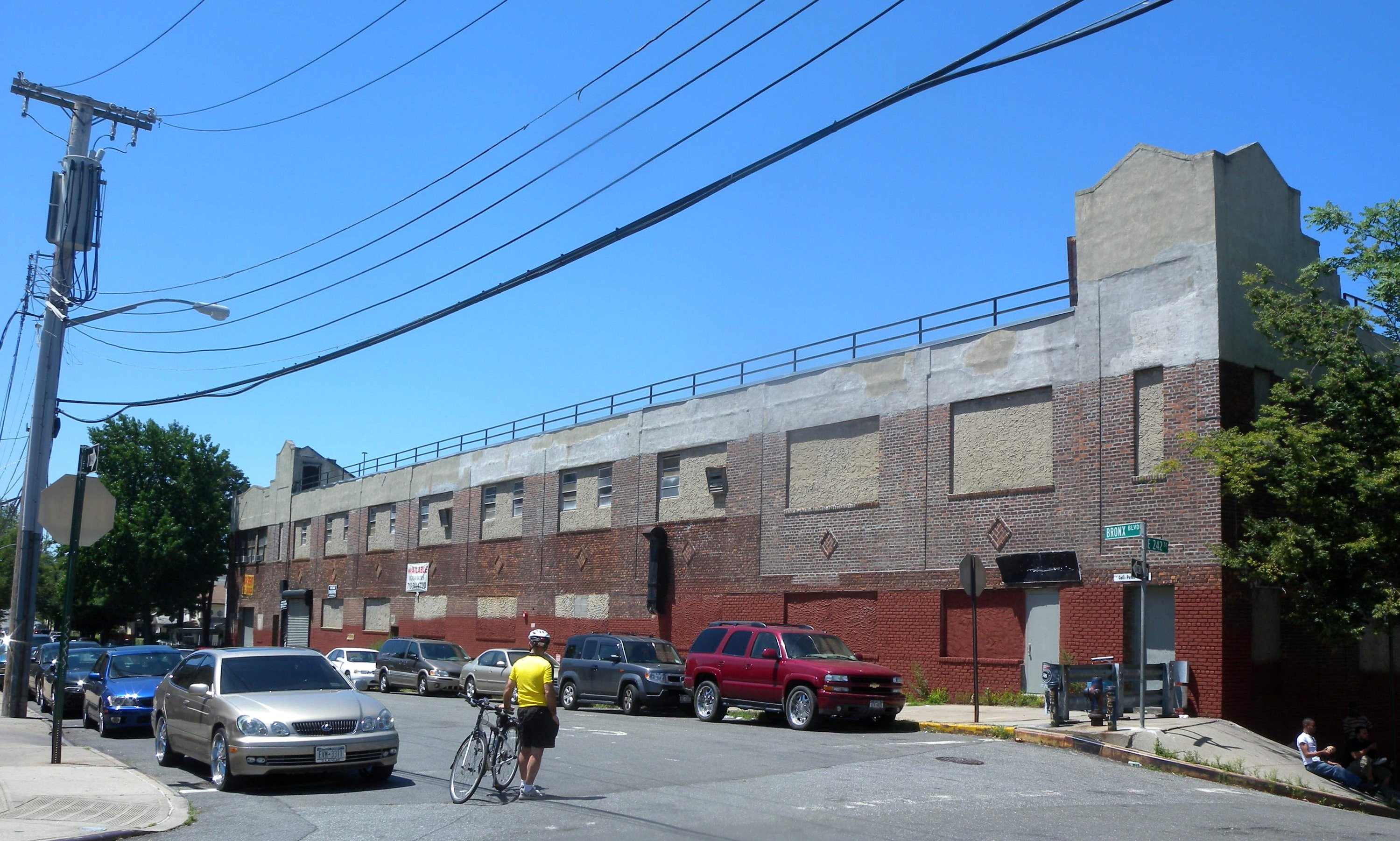
- Factory building on Bronx Boulevard
- Location in New York City
- Coordinates: 40.897°N 73.852°W
- Country: United States
- State: New York
- City: New York City
- Borough: The Bronx
- Community District: Bronx 12

Area
  - Total: 0.991 sq mi (2.57 km^{2})

Population (2011)
  - Total: 29,158
  - Density: 29,400/sq mi (11,400/km^{2})

Economics
  - Median income: $56,446
- ZIP Codes: 10466, 10470
- Area code: 718, 347, 929, and 917

Wakefield is a working-class and middle-class section of the northern borough of the Bronx in New York City. It is bounded by the city's border with Westchester County to the north, East 222nd Street to the south, and the Bronx River Parkway to the west.

Wakefield is the northernmost neighborhood in New York City (although, because of the slant of the Hudson and the grid system relative to true north, the city's northernmost point is actually in Riverdale, at the University of Mount Saint Vincent). The neighborhood is part of Bronx Community District 12 and its ZIP Codes are 10466 and 10470. Wakefield is patrolled by the 47th Precinct of the New York City Police Department.

== History ==
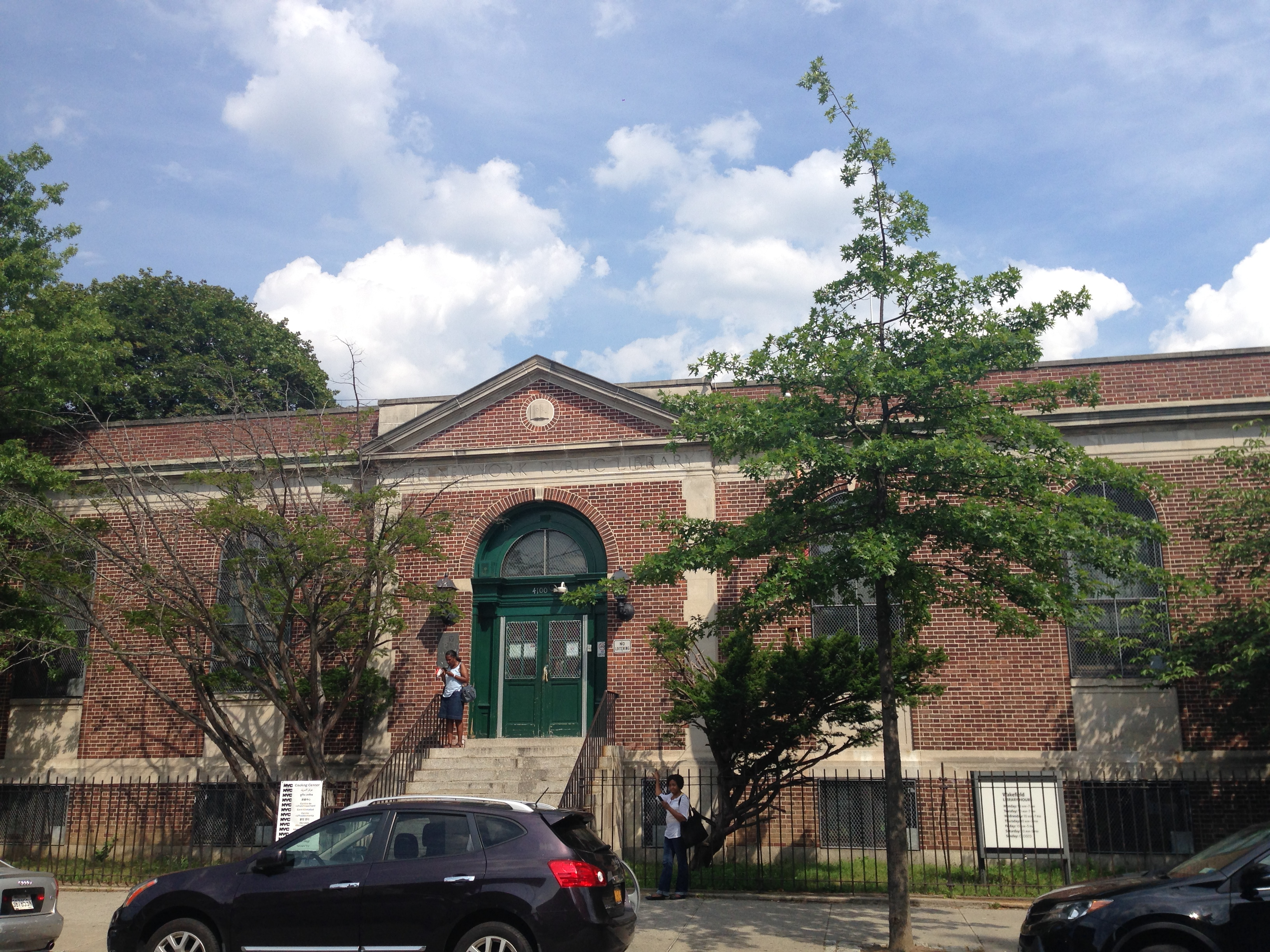
New York Public Library, Wakefield branch

Wakefield, originally in Westchester County, became part of New York County and New York City, when the eastern section of The Bronx was incorporated and merged with the western section (previously incorporated in 1873) as a borough of New York City, in 1895. Like the rest of the Bronx, it was once mainly forested and later became farmland. With the expansion of railroad transportation via the arrival of the New York and Harlem Railroad circa 1840, the area experienced moderate development. In 1898, the boroughs of Manhattan and The Bronx were merged with greater New York City as a result of the state legislature's decision to amalgamate New York City with Brooklyn, Queens, and Staten Island. The Bronx later attained independent county status on April 19, 1912, which makes it the 62nd and youngest county in the state.

The current Wakefield station of the Metro-North Railroad's Harlem Line was on the site of a village called Washingtonville, which was incorporated into Wakefield when it became a village on August 8, 1889. Wakefield was named after the Virginia plantation where George Washington was born (now part of George Washington Birthplace National Monument). Neighboring Mount Vernon, in Westchester County, is named for the plantation where Washington lived for most of his adulthood.

== Demographics ==
Formerly, Wakefield was home to large Irish American and Italian-American populations. During the 1980s, these communities were replaced with large Caribbean and Guyanese populations, which now compose 77.3% of the neighborhood's total population. 19.6% of the population is Hispanic. Many residents are or are descended from the Caribbean (mostly Jamaican) and Guyanese immigrants.

The 2010 United States census reported a population of 67,813 residents in the surrounding area, while the 2000 United States census reported a total of 68,787 residents.

== Police and crime ==
Wakefield and Eastchester are patrolled by the 47th Precinct of the NYPD, located at 4111 Laconia Avenue. The 47th Precinct ranked 35th safest out of 69 patrol areas for per-capita crime in 2010.

The 47th Precinct has a lower crime rate than in the 1990s, with crimes across all categories having decreased by 60.9% between 1990 and 2022. The precinct reported 16 murders, 45 rapes, 461 robberies, 732 felony assaults, 300 burglaries, 758 grand larcenies, and 461 grand larcenies auto in 2022.

=== Social problems ===
Wakefield has seen a rise in gangs and gang-related violence from neighboring Edenwald. The high school drop-out rate is higher than the city average, but lower than central Bronx neighborhoods. Many households in the area are headed by a single mother.

== Fire safety ==
Wakefield is served by the New York City Fire Department (FDNY)'s Engine Co. 63/Ladder Co. 39/Battalion 15, located at 755 East 233rd Street.

== Post office and ZIP Codes ==
Wakefield is located within two ZIP Codes. Most of the neighborhood is located in 10466, but certain areas around East 241st Street and White Plains Road are part of 10470. The United States Postal Service operates the Wakefield Station post office at 4165 White Plains Road.

== Education ==
=== Schools ===
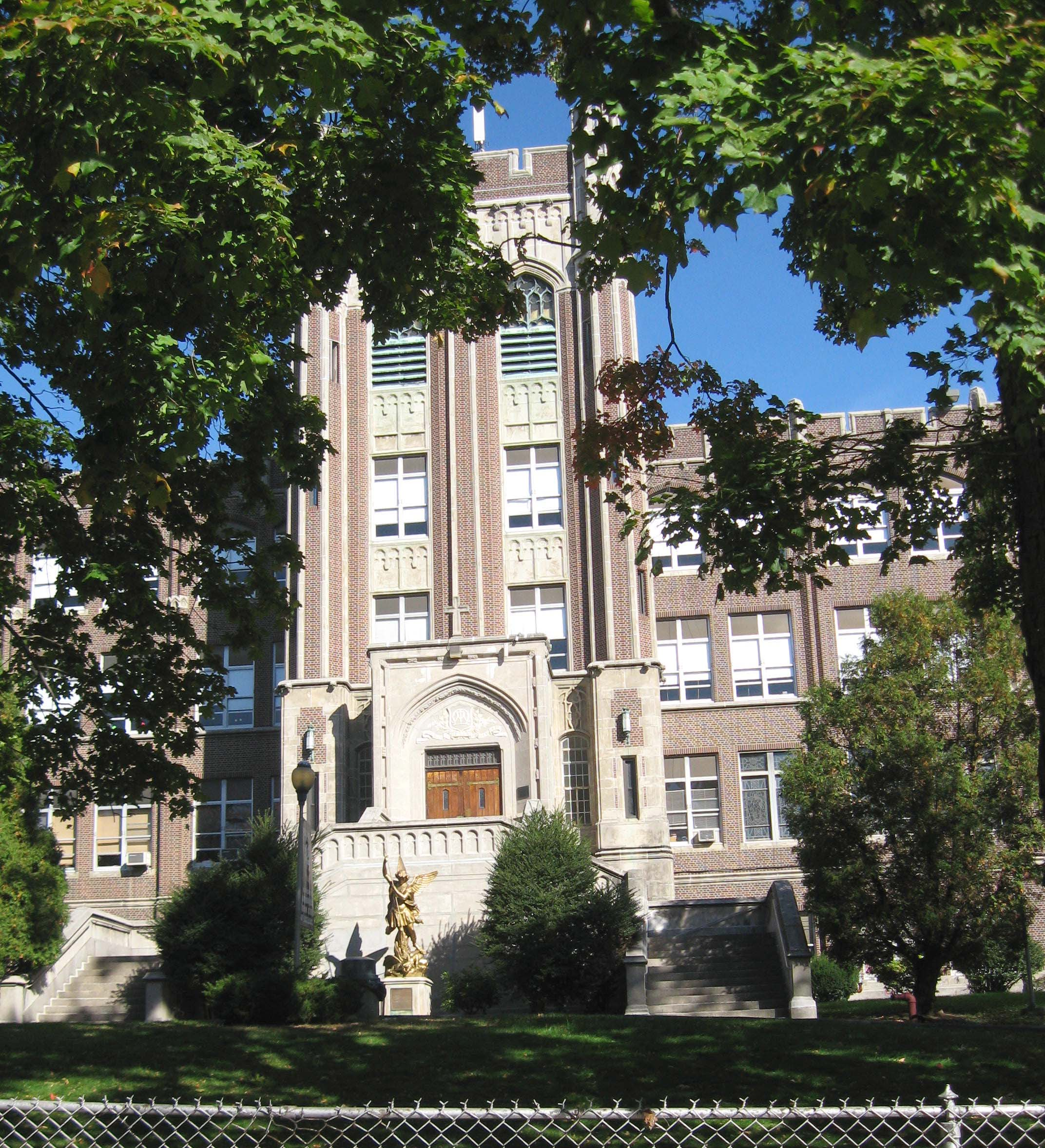
Mount Saint Michael Academy

There are several public schools scattered throughout the neighborhood including PS 16, PS 21 and PS 103. There are also many private and catholic schools including St. Francis-Assisi, Our Lady of Grace and the prominent all-male Catholic secondary school Mount Saint Michael Academy, which serves 1,100 students from grades 7–12. The all-female St. Barnabas High School serves many students from Wakefield and is located further west in Woodlawn (and partly in Westchester).

=== Library ===
The New York Public Library (NYPL)'s Wakefield branch is located at 4100 Lowerre Place. The branch opened in 1938 and contains collections in its basement and first floor.

== Transportation ==
The following MTA Regional Bus Operations bus routes serve Wakefield:

- Bx8: to Locust Point (via Williamsbridge Road)
- Bx16: to Eastchester or Norwood – 205th Street (via Nereid Avenue and Mundy Lane)
- Bx31: to Woodlawn or Westchester Square (via Eastchester Road)
- Bx39: to Soundview and Clasons Point, Bronx (via White Plains Road)
- BxM11: Express bus to Midtown Manhattan

Wakefield is also served by the following Bee-Line Bus System routes to Westchester County, New York:

- BL25: to Yonkers (via Kimball Avenue and Midland Avenue)
- BL26: to Bronxville (via Bronx River Road)
- BL40: to White Plains and Valhalla (via NY Route 22)
- BL41: Limited Stops to White Plains and Valhalla (via NY Route 22)
- BL42: to New Rochelle (via White Plains Road, West 1st Street and Sanford Blvd)
- BL43x: Express to Valhalla (via Sprain Brook Parkway)

The following New York City Subway stations serve Wakefield:

- Wakefield–241st Street (2 train)
- Nereid Avenue (2 and 5 trains)
- 233rd Street (2 and 5 trains)
- 225th Street (2 and 5 trains)

The Metro-North Railroad also stops at Wakefield station, served by the Harlem Line.

== In popular culture ==
Several scenes from the 1970 film Love Story starring Ryan O'Neal and Ali MacGraw were filmed on East 233rd Street, East 238th Street (Nereid Avenue), and Barnes Avenue, all located within the neighborhood. The Redeemer Evangelical Lutheran Church located at 4360 Boyd Avenue (corner of Barnes Avenue) is featured in the film.

Many internal and external bar scenes from the second season of the Showtime network's drama series Billions were filmed at the longtime neighborhood bar Cullen's Tavern, located at 4340 White Plains Road.

Scenes for The Sopranos prequel film, The Many Saints of Newark were filmed in Wakefield and neighboring Edenwald in May 2019.

== Notable people ==
Notable current and former residents of Wakefield include:

- Lloyd Barnes (born 1944), Jamaican music producer
- Dick Bertel (1931–2023), media personality and broadcast executive
- Darcel Clark (born 1962), Bronx District Attorney
- Rocco B. Commisso (born 1949), founder and CEO of Mediacom and philanthropist
- Desus Nice (born 1981), comedian and TV personality
- Joseph Augustine Di Noia (born 1943), member of the Dominican Order who is a Roman Catholic archbishop and theologian
- Silvio DiSalvatore – independent filmmaker and reality television personality
- Funkmaster Flex (born 1968) hip hop DJ, rapper and producer
- Ramarley Graham (died 2012), police-brutality victim
- Craig Grant (1968–2021), poet and actor who appeared on the series Oz
- Marcia V. Keizs, president of York College, City University of New York, from 2005 to 2019
- Rosetta Lenoire (1911–2002), theatrical and television actress; she spent her final years living on East 232nd Street and was a parishioner of St. Frances of Rome Church on East 236th Street
- Adelina Patti (1843–1919), 19th century opera singer
- Carlotta Patti (1835–1889), 19th century opera singer
- Christian Petroni, chef and Food Network personality
- Cristina Santiago – LGBT activist, was one of seven victims killed during the August 2011 Indiana State Fair stage collapse
- AJ Silver (born Angelo Iodice) – American rodeo circuit celebrity
- Anthony Thomopoulos, former network American Broadcasting Company chairman and motion picture producer
- Mildred Trouillot (born 1963), attorney and former First Lady of Haiti; resided on Carpenter Avenue in her youth and graduated from St. Barnabas High School
- Jerry Vale (1930–2014), singer and entertainer who resided with his family on Mundy Lane during his early years
