= Tremont, Bronx =

Neighborhood in New York City

Tremont
- Neighborhood of the Bronx
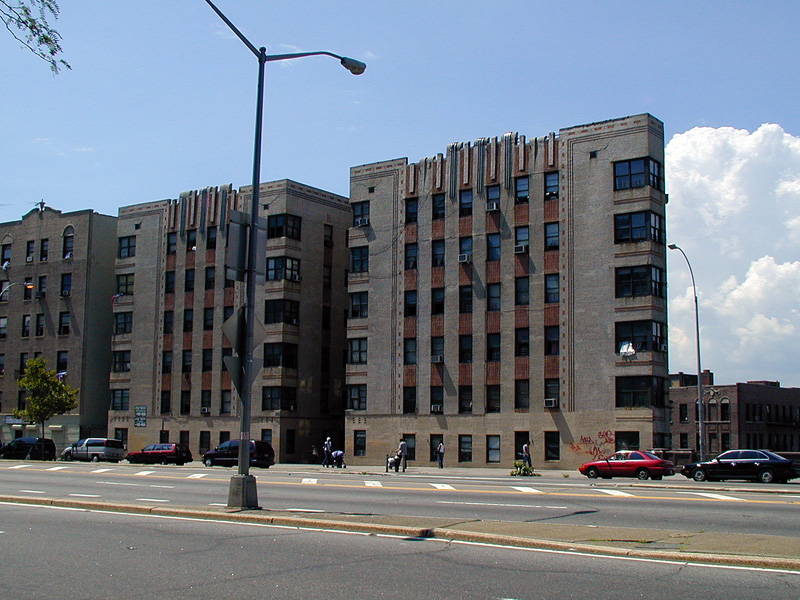
- The Grand Concourse runs through the neighborhood.
- Location in New York City
- Coordinates: 40.85°N 73.906°W
- Country: United States
- State: New York
- City: New York City
- Borough: The Bronx

Area
  - Total: 0.301 sq mi (0.78 km^{2})

Population (2011)
  - Total: 24,739
  - Density: 82,200/sq mi (31,700/km^{2})

Economics
  - Median income: $26,290

Ethnicity
  - Hispanic: 67.5%
  - Black: 27.1%
  - White: 1.3%
  - Asian: 2%
  - Others: 2.1%
- ZIP Codes: 10453, 10457
- Area codes: 718, 347, 929, and 917

Tremont is a residential neighborhood in the West Bronx, New York City. Its boundaries are East 181st Street to the north, Third Avenue to the east, the Cross-Bronx Expressway to the south, and the Grand Concourse to the west. East Tremont Avenue is the primary thoroughfare through Tremont.

The neighborhood is part of Bronx Community Board 6, and its ZIP Codes include 10453 and 10457. The local subway is the IND Concourse Line (B and D trains), operating along the Grand Concourse. The area is patrolled by the NYPD's 48th and 46th Precincts.

== Demographics ==
Tremont has a population of around 24,739. The neighborhood is now predominantly Dominican, with a significant longstanding Puerto Rican and African American population.

The entirety of Community District 6, which comprises Tremont and Belmont, had 87,476 inhabitants as of NYC Health's 2018 Community Health Profile, with an average life expectancy of 77.7 years. This is lower than the median life expectancy of 81.2 for all New York City neighborhoods. Most inhabitants are youth and middle-aged adults: 29% are between the ages of between 0–17, 28% between 25–44, and 20% between 45–64. The ratio of college-aged and elderly residents was lower, at 14% and 9% respectively.

As of 2017, the median household income in Community Districts 3 and 6, including Crotona Park East and Morrisania, was $25,972. In 2018, an estimated 31% of Tremont and Belmont residents lived in poverty, compared to 25% in all of the Bronx and 20% in all of New York City. One in six residents (16%) were unemployed, compared to 13% in the Bronx and 9% in New York City. Rent burden, or the percentage of residents who have difficulty paying their rent, is 60% in Tremont and Belmont, compared to the boroughwide and citywide rates of 58% and 51% respectively. Based on this calculation, as of 2018, Tremont and Belmont are gentrifying.

== Etymology ==
Rather than having come from a colonial settlement, the name "Tremont" was invented by a postmaster in the 1800s, derived from the three ("tre") neighborhoods of Mount Eden, Mount Hope, and Fairmount in the west-central Bronx.

== Land use and terrain ==
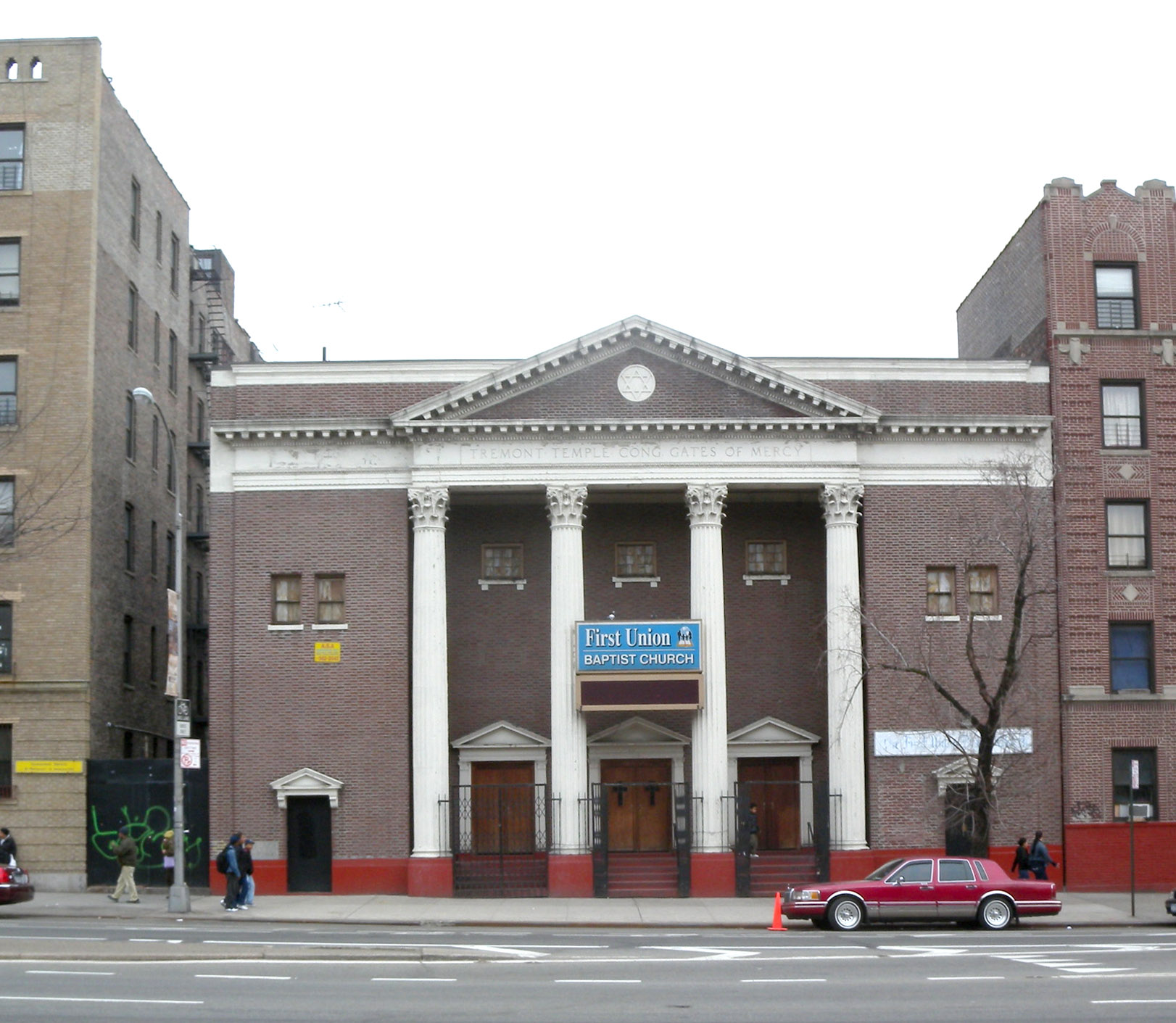
Looking east across Grand Concourse at former Tremont Temple, now First Union Baptist Church

Tremont is dominated by 5 and 6-story apartment houses. The total land area is less than 1-square-mile (2.6 km^{2}). The area is elevated above adjacent areas and is very hilly. Stair streets connect areas located at different elevations.

=== Morris Avenue Historic District ===
The Morris Avenue Historic District, designated by the New York City Landmarks Preservation Commission, lines Morris Avenue between East Tremont and East 179th Street. The district consists of attached brownstones.

== Police and crime ==
Tremont and Belmont are patrolled by the 48th Precinct of the NYPD, located at 450 Cross Bronx Expressway. The 48th Precinct ranked 56th safest out of 69 patrol areas for per-capita crime in 2010. As of 2018, with a non-fatal assault rate of 152 per 100,000 people, Tremont and Belmont's rate of violent crimes per capita is greater than that of the city as a whole. The incarceration rate of 1,015 per 100,000 people is higher than that of the city as a whole.

The 48th Precinct has a lower crime rate than in the 1990s, with crimes across all categories having decreased by 60.9% between 1990 and 2022. The precinct reported 14 murders, 26 rapes, 447 robberies, 646 felony assaults, 252 burglaries, 467 grand larcenies, and 304 grand larcenies auto in 2022.

== Fire safety ==
Tremont contains two New York City Fire Department (FDNY) fire stations:

- Engine Co. 42 – 1781 Monroe Avenue
- Engine Co. 46/Ladder Co. 27 – 460 Cross Bronx Expressway

== Health ==
As of 2018, preterm births and births to teenage mothers are more common in Tremont and Belmont than in other places citywide. In Tremont and Belmont, there were 113 preterm births per 1,000 live births (compared to 87 per 1,000 citywide), and 30.4 births to teenage mothers per 1,000 live births (compared to 19.3 per 1,000 citywide). Tremont and Belmont has a relatively average population of residents who are uninsured. In 2018, this population of uninsured residents was estimated to be 12%, equal to the citywide rate of 12%.

The concentration of fine particulate matter, the deadliest type of air pollutant, in Tremont and Belmont is 0.008 milligrams per cubic metre (8.0×10^{−9} oz/ft^{3}), more than the city average. Sixteen percent of Tremont and Belmont residents are smokers, which is higher than the city average of 14% of residents being smokers. In Tremont and Belmont, 36% of residents are obese, 22% are diabetic, and 32% have high blood pressure—compared to the citywide averages of 24%, 11%, and 28% respectively. In addition, 20% of children are obese, compared to the citywide average of 20%.

Eighty-one percent of residents eat some fruits and vegetables every day, which is less than the city's average of 87%. In 2018, 69% of residents described their health as "good", "very good", or "excellent", lower than the city's average of 78%. For every supermarket in Tremont and Belmont, there are 37 bodegas.

The nearest hospitals are St Barnabas Hospital in Belmont and Bronx-Lebanon Hospital Center in Claremont.

== Post office and ZIP Code ==
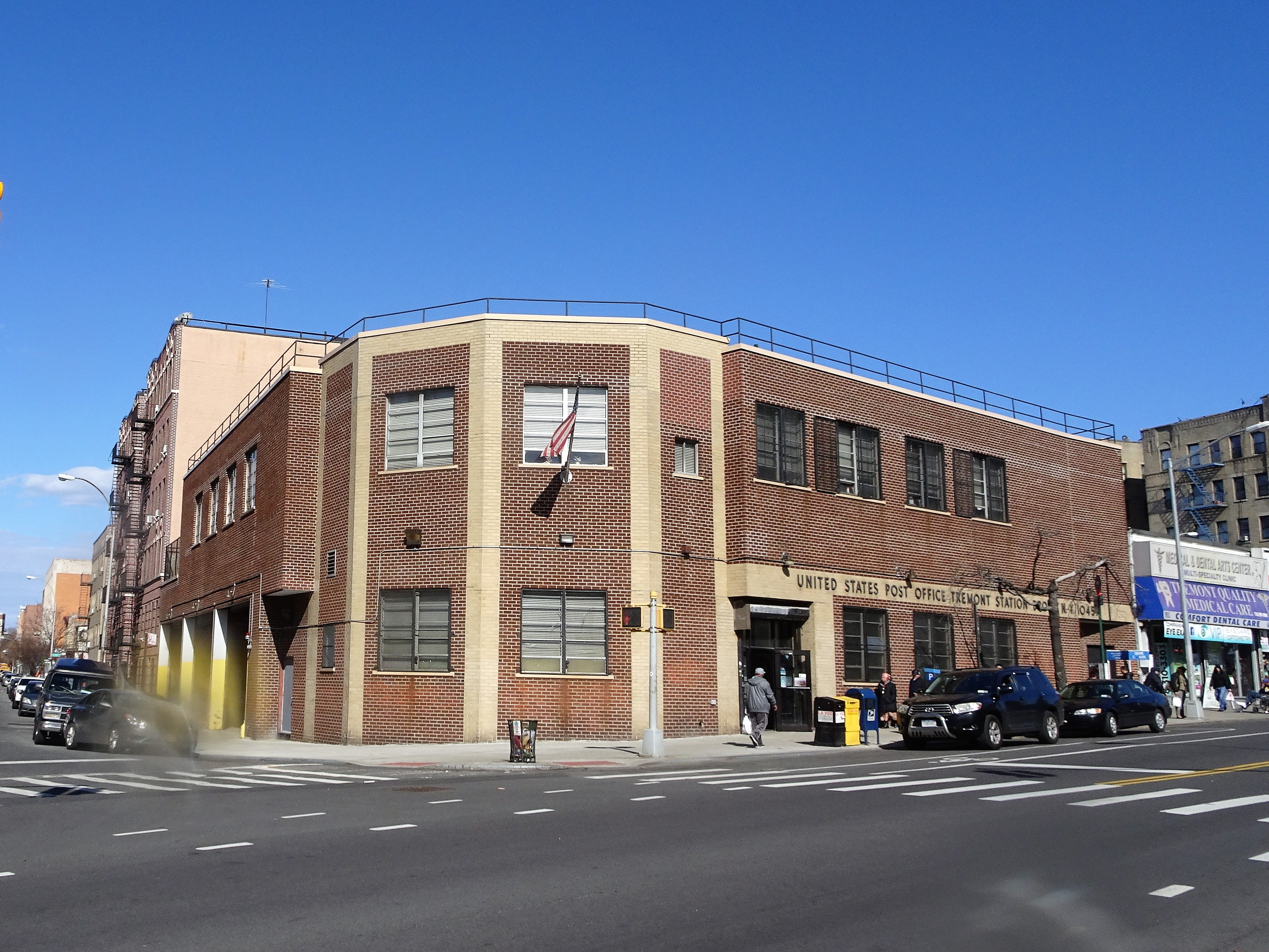
Post office

Tremont is covered by the ZIP Code 10457. The United States Postal Service operates the Tremont Station at 757 East Tremont Avenue.

== Education ==
Tremont and Belmont generally have a lower rate of college-educated residents than the rest of the city as of 2018. While 19% of residents age 25 and older have a college education or higher, 36% have less than a high school education and 45% are high school graduates or have some college education. By contrast, 26% of Bronx residents and 43% of city residents have a college education or higher. The percentage of Tremont and Belmont students excelling in math rose from 19% in 2000 to 44% in 2011, and reading achievement increased from 25% to 30% during the same time period.

Tremont and Belmont's rate of elementary school student absenteeism is more than the rest of New York City. In Tremont and Belmont, 35% of elementary school students missed twenty or more days per school year, higher than the citywide average of 20%. Additionally, 61% of high school students in Tremont and Belmont graduate on time, lower than the citywide average of 75%.

=== Schools ===
Public:

- PS 9: Ryer (East 183rd Street and Ryer Avenue)
- PS 28: Mount Hope (Mount Hope Place and Anthony Avenue)
- PS 79: Creston (East 181st Street and Creston Avenue)
- PS 163: Arthur Alonso Schomburg (East 180th Street and Webster Avenue)
- PS 173: (Walton Avenue and Mount Hope Place)
- PS/MS 279: Captain Manuel Rivera (East 181st Street and Walton Avenue)
- MS 117: Joseph H. Wade (East 176th Street and Morris Avenue)
- MS 331: The Bronx School of Science Inquiry and Investigation (West Tremont Avenue and Davidson Avenue)
- MS 391: Angelo Patri (East 182nd Street and Webster Avenue)
- PS 70: Max Schonberg School (Weeks Avenue bet. E. 173rd and E. 174th Streets)
- Aurelia Greene Educational Campus (1302 Edward L. Grant Highway)

Parochial: The Roman Catholic Archdiocese of New York operates Bronx Catholic schools:

- St. Margaret Mary School (121 East and 177th Street)
- St. Joseph Catholic School closed in 2019.

=== Libraries ===
The New York Public Library operates the Tremont branch at 1866 Washington Avenue. The branch, a Carnegie library designed by Carrère and Hastings in the Italian Renaissance style, was opened in 1905. Another branch, the Grand Concourse branch, is located at 155 East 173rd Street. The branch is a two-story structure that opened in 1959.

== Transportation ==
The following MTA Regional Bus Operations bus routes serve Tremont:

- Bx1: to Riverdale or Third Avenue–138th Street station (6 and <6> trains, via Grand Concourse)
- Bx2: to Kingsbridge Heights or Third Avenue–138th Street station (6 and <6> trains, via Grand Concourse)
- Bx15: to Fordham Plaza or The Hub (via 3rd Avenue)
- Bx36: to Castle Hill or George Washington Bridge Bus Terminal (via Tremont Avenue)
- Bx40: to SUNY Maritime College or Morris Heights (via 180th Street, Tremont and Burnside Avenues)
- Bx41 and Bx41 SBS: to Gun Hill Road station (2 and 5 trains) or Third Avenue–149th Street station (2 and 5 trains, via Webster Avenue)
- Bx42: to Throgs Neck or Morris Heights (via 180th Street, Tremont and Burnside Avenues)

The following New York City Subway stations serve Tremont:

- 174th–175th Streets station (B and D trains)
- Tremont Avenue station (B and D trains)
- Mount Eden Avenue station (4 train)
- Burnside Avenue station (4 train)

The Metro-North Railroad's Harlem Line also serves Tremont at the Tremont station.
