= West Bronx =

Region of the Bronx in New York City

Coordinates: 40.850°N 73.900°W

The West Bronx is a region in the New York City borough of the Bronx. The region lies west of the Bronx River and roughly corresponds to the western half of the borough.

The West Bronx is more densely populated than the East Bronx, and is closer to Upper Manhattan. From the late 17th century to the middle 19th century this included the central and southern part of the Town of Yonkers, but then became the separate Town of Kingsbridge. In 1874, the then towns of Kingsbridge, West Farms and Morrisania were transferred to New York County, becoming the first area outside Manhattan to be annexed by the City of New York. Today's West Bronx was then known as the "Annexed District". In 1895, the city annexed the modern-day East Bronx, followed in 1898 by western Queens County (today's borough of Queens, with the remainder of what was eastern Queens County becoming the newly formed Nassau County), all of the City of Brooklyn (today's borough of Brooklyn), and all of Richmond County (today's borough of Staten Island) to form the consolidated city of New York.

Physically, the western parts of the Bronx are hilly, underlain by Fordham gneiss and dominated by a series of parallel ridges running south to north. The West Bronx has older tenement buildings, low-income public housing complexes, multifamily homes in its lower-income areas as well as larger single family homes in more affluent areas such as Riverdale. It includes New York City's third largest park: Van Cortlandt Park which runs along the Westchester-Bronx border. The Grand Concourse, a wide ridgeline boulevard runs through the area from north to south. Because the West Bronx uses the same street numbering system as Manhattan, large portions of streets designated as "east" (e.g., East 161st Street) may actually be located west of the Bronx River. This is because the east-west divider is Fifth Avenue in Manhattan and Jerome Avenue in the Bronx, which is directly north of Fifth Avenue. Jerome Avenue was approximately the centerline of the original Annexed District, though not of the expanded modern Bronx.

Prior to the 1970s, New Yorkers generally saw the Bronx as being split into its eastern and western halves. However, with the urban decay that hit the southwestern Bronx starting in the 1960s, people began to see the borough as being fundamentally divided between the southwestern area ("The South Bronx") and everywhere else.

== Neighborhoods ==
West Bronx neighborhoods include:

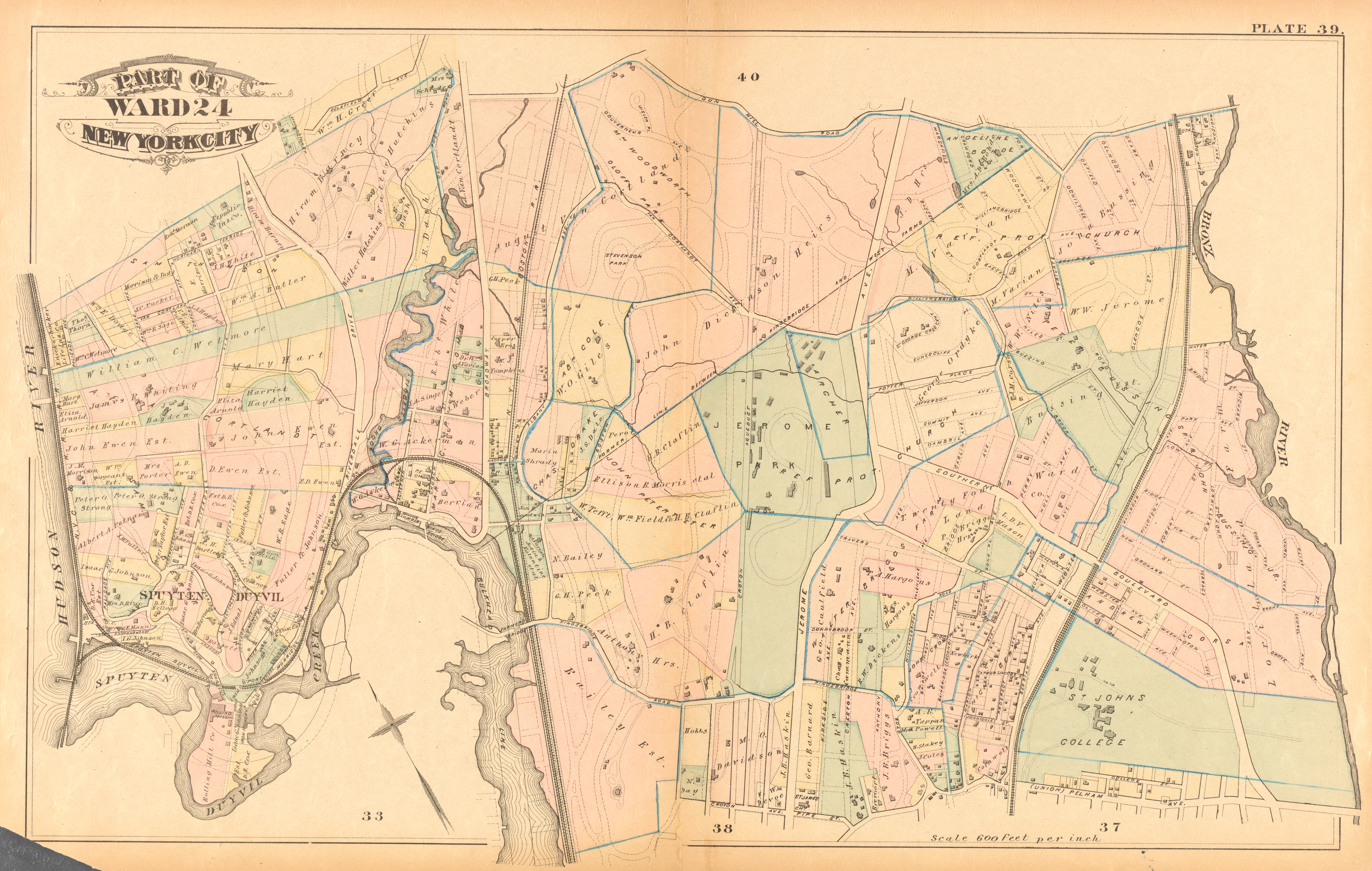
Map showing the old border of Kingsbridge and West Farms

From the Town of Kingsbridge (originally the southern part of the Town of Yonkers).

- Kingsbridge Heights
- Kingsbridge
- Riverdale
- Spuyten Duyvil
- Woodlawn Heights

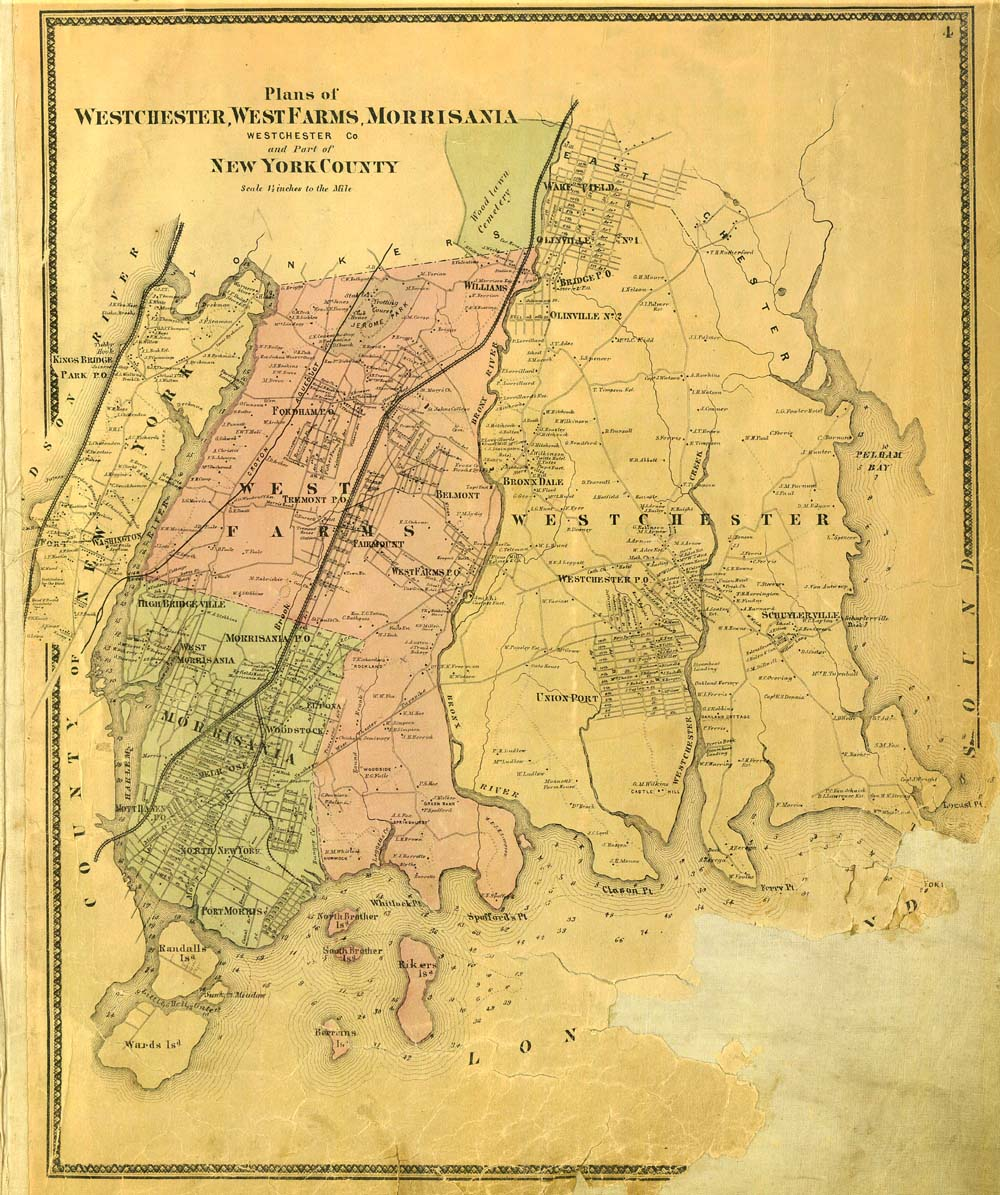
West Farms (pink), and Morrisania (green), 1867

From the Town of Morrisania (Encompasses areas now considered to be the South Bronx):

- Port Morris
- Mott Haven (North New York in map)
- Melrose
- Morrisania (Originally Morrisania Village)
- Concourse
- East Morrisania
- Longwood
- Concourse
- Highbridge

From the Town of West Farms:

- West Farms
- Hunts Point
- East Tremont
- Tremont
- Morris Heights
- University Heights
- Belmont
- Fordham
- Fordham-Bedford
- Bedford Park
- Mosholu Parkway
- Norwood

The West Bronx is the home of Yankee Stadium.

== See also ==
- East Bronx
- South Bronx
- North Bronx
