= West Farms, Bronx =

Neighborhood in New York City

West Farms
- Neighborhood of the Bronx
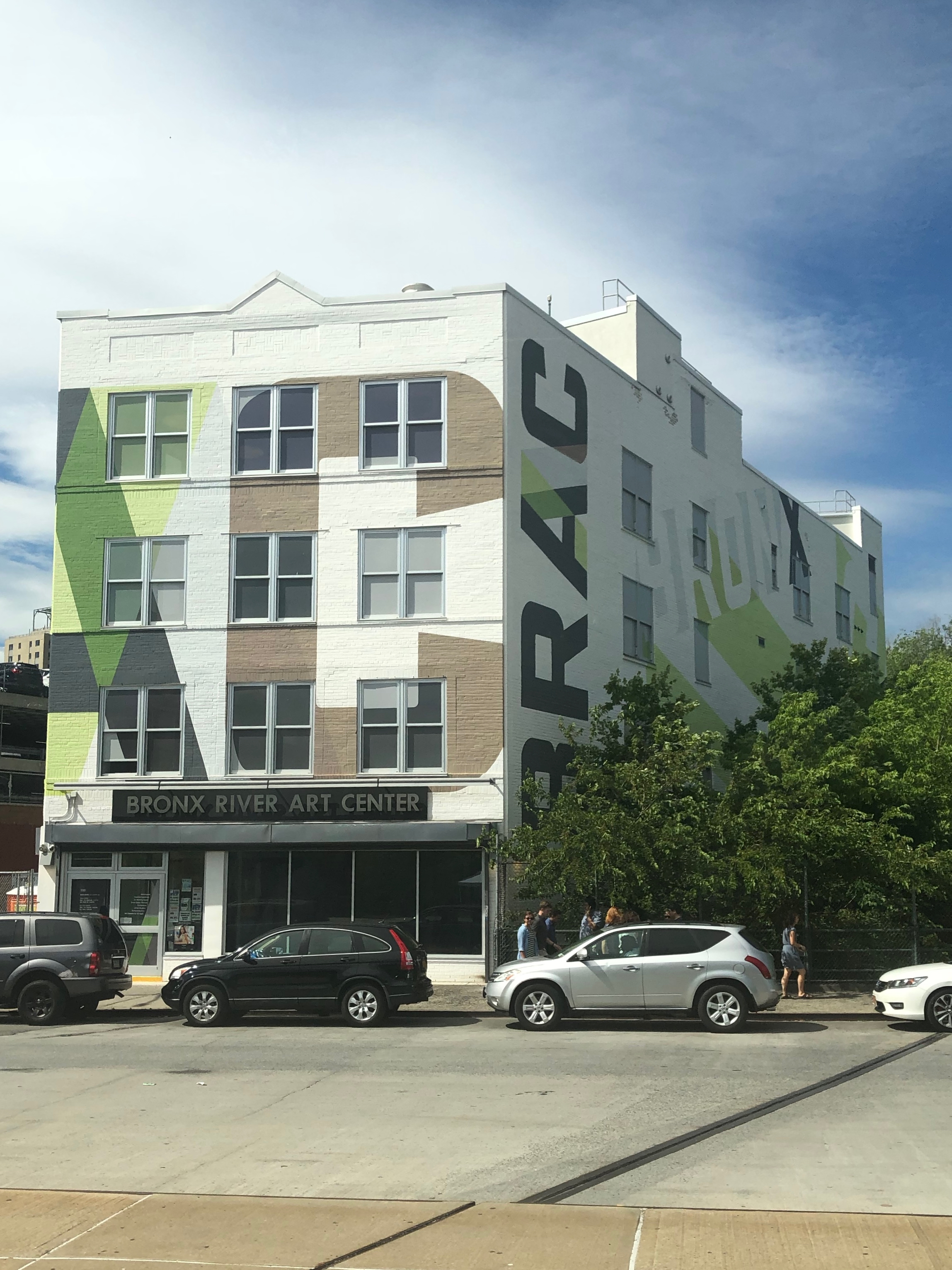
- Bronx River Art Center on Tremont Avenue
- Location in New York City
- Coordinates: 40.840°N 73.878°W
- Country: United States
- State: New York
- City: New York City
- Borough: The Bronx
- Community District: The Bronx 6

Area
  - Total: 0.148 sq mi (0.38 km^{2})

Population (2011)
  - Total: 4,700
  - Density: 32,000/sq mi (12,000/km^{2})

Economics
  - Median income: $35,423
- ZIP Codes: 10460
- Area code: 718, 347, 929, and 917
- Website: www.westfarms.nyc

West Farms is a residential neighborhood in The Bronx, New York City. Its boundaries are Bronx Park to the north, the Bronx River to the east, the Cross Bronx Expressway to the south, and Southern Boulevard to the west. East Tremont Avenue is the primary thoroughfare through West Farms.

West Farms is part of Bronx Community Board 6, and its ZIP Code is 10460. The area is patrolled by the NYPD's 48th Precinct.

== History ==
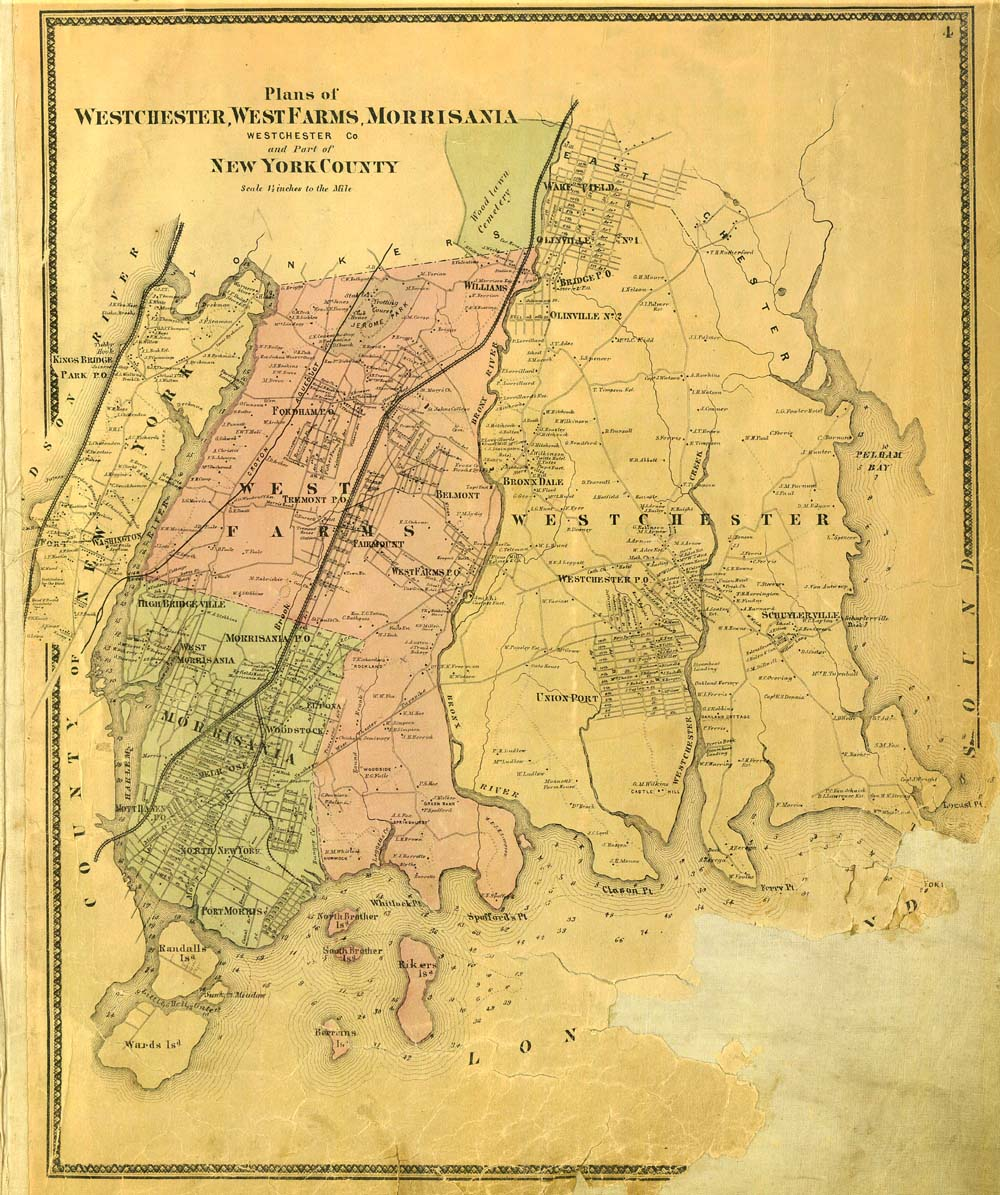
West Farms (pink), and Morrisania (green), 1867

West Farms was separated from the town of Westchester, New York, by an act of the legislature in 1846, formed from the settlements of West Farms, Morrisania, and Fordham, which survive as recognizable neighborhoods of The Bronx to this day.

The patent of the "West Farms", which were the farthest western section of Westchester, were granted by letters patent in 1666 to Edward Jessup and John Richardson, both of Westchester, who had jointly purchased it "of the Indyan proprietors". It was bounded on the east by the "river commonly called by the Indians Aquehung, otherwise Broncke river". Jessup was dead within a year, and his widow conveyed his share to Thomas Hunt of Westchester, whose family is commemorated in the name of Hunts Point. In 1711, the heirs of the patentees joined in a second division of the lands in twelve lots with immutable boundaries, which were subsequently divided up.

During the American Revolution numerous engagements occurred here; there were too few able-bodied men to form a company of continental militia, so West Farms formed a joint company with Fordham.

In 1848 the village of West Farms was described as "pleasantly situated at the head of the navigable waters of the Bronx, three miles from the East river, and twelve from New York". The rapidly growing village already had about 1000 inhabitants, in about 200 houses. There were three district schools, for boys and girls, and a ladies' seminary and a boys' private school. The railroad depot of the Harlem & Westchester Rail Road stood a mile north of the village, where there were four churches, "4 taverns, a temperance house, 12 stores of different kinds, and a post office." In addition to seven sloops moored on the Bronx River, there were manufactories: a Brussels carpet and spinning factory, another carpet manufactory, and a grist mill and a lumber mill, formerly de Lancey's Mills, converting the last stands of timber accessible to the Bronx River upstream.

Rail service to the city was on an almost hourly schedule, and West Farms was developing into a railroad suburb like Yonkers, which bounded it on the north. In 1848 the Hunt house (built in 1688) still stood on Hunts Point at the end of "Planting Neck", and the high ground along the neck was dotted with villas. Poet Joseph Rodman Drake found inspiration in the views of Long Island Sound and is buried nearby. Some of the soldiers buried at West Farms Soldiers Cemetery on East 180th Street served in the American Civil War.

== Demographics ==
West Farms has one of the highest concentrations of Puerto Ricans in New York City. Almost half the population lives below the poverty line and receives public assistance (AFDC, Home Relief, Supplemental Security Income, and Medicaid). The vast majority of households are renter occupied. Many households in the area are headed by a single mother which contributes to its high poverty rate. Many parents had children at a young age, and many West Farms families have been in poverty for generations. The incarceration rate in the area is also very high. In 2012, the 10460 zip code had the 17th highest number of incarcerated residents of any New York City zip code.

Based on data from the 2010 United States census, the population of West Farms-Bronx River was 35,011, an increase of 469 (1.4%) from the 34,542 counted in 2000. Covering an area of 344.72 acres (139.50 ha), the combined neighborhood had a population density of 101.6 inhabitants per acre (65,000/sq mi; 25,100/km^{2}).

The racial makeup of the neighborhood was 26.6% (9,312) African American, 3.2% (1,136) Asian, 2.5% (878) White, 0.3% (121) Native American, 0.0% (10) Pacific Islander, 2.1% (743) from other races and 1.4% (482) from two or more races. Hispanic or Latino of any race were 63.8% (22,329) of the population.

The entirety of Community District 6, which comprises West Farms and Belmont, had 87,476 inhabitants as of NYC Health's 2018 Community Health Profile, with an average life expectancy of 77.7 years. This is lower than the median life expectancy of 81.2 for all New York City neighborhoods. Most inhabitants are youth and middle-aged adults: 29% are between the ages of between 0–17, 28% between 25 and 44, and 20% between 45 and 64. The ratio of college-aged and elderly residents was lower, at 14% and 9% respectively.

As of 2017, the median household income in Community Districts 3 and 6, including Crotona Park East and Morrisania, was $25,972. In 2018, an estimated 31% of West Farms and Belmont residents lived in poverty, compared to 25% in all of the Bronx and 20% in all of New York City. One in six residents (16%) were unemployed, compared to 13% in the Bronx and 9% in New York City. Rent burden, or the percentage of residents who have difficulty paying their rent, is 60% in West Farms and Belmont, compared to the boroughwide and citywide rates of 58% and 51% respectively. Based on this calculation, as of 2018, West Farms and Belmont are gentrifying.

== Land use and terrain ==
West Farms is dominated by five and six-story tenement buildings, older multi-unit homes, vacant lots, and newly constructed subsidized attached multi-unit townhouses and apartment buildings. Most of the original housing stock was structurally damaged by arson and eventually razed by the city. The total land area is less than one square mile. The terrain is somewhat hilly.

The West Farms Bus Depot is located along East 177th Street next to a terminated Sheridan Expressway; it opened on September 7, 2003, on the site of the former Coliseum Depot.

There are two NYCHA developments located in West Farms.

1. 1010 East 178th Street; a 21-story building.
2. Twin Parks East (Site 9); a 14-story building.

== Police and crime ==
West Farms and Belmont are patrolled by the 48th Precinct of the NYPD, located at 450 Cross Bronx Expressway. The 48th Precinct ranked 56th safest out of 69 patrol areas for per-capita crime in 2010. As of 2018, with a non-fatal assault rate of 152 per 100,000 people, West Farms and Belmont's rate of violent crimes per capita is greater than that of the city as a whole. The incarceration rate of 1,015 per 100,000 people is higher than that of the city as a whole.

The 48th Precinct has a lower crime rate than in the 1990s, with crimes across all categories having decreased by 60.9% between 1990 and 2022. The precinct reported 14 murders, 26 rapes, 447 robberies, 646 felony assaults, 252 burglaries, 467 grand larcenies, and 304 grand larcenies auto in 2022.

NYCHA property in the area is patrolled by P.S.A. 8 at 2794 Randall Avenue in the Throggs Neck section of the Bronx.

Many social problems associated with poverty, from crime to drug addiction, have plagued the area for decades. Despite declines in crime from its peak during the crack and heroin epidemics, violent crime continues to be a serious problem in the community. West Farms has significantly higher drop out rates and more incidents of violence in its schools than in other parts of the city. Other problems in local schools include low test scores and high truancy rates. Drug addiction is also a serious problem in the community. Peer pressure among children who come from broken homes contributes to the high rate of usage.

== Fire safety ==
West Farms contains a New York City Fire Department (FDNY) fire station, Engine Co. 45/Ladder Co. 58/Battalion 18, at 925 East Tremont Avenue.

== Health ==
As of 2018, preterm births and births to teenage mothers are more common in West Farms and Belmont than in other places citywide. In West Farms and Belmont, there were 113 preterm births per 1,000 live births (compared to 87 per 1,000 citywide), and 30.4 births to teenage mothers per 1,000 live births (compared to 19.3 per 1,000 citywide). West Farms and Belmont has a relatively average population of residents who are uninsured. In 2018, this population of uninsured residents was estimated to be 12%, equal to the citywide rate of 12%.

The concentration of fine particulate matter, the deadliest type of air pollutant, in West Farms and Belmont is 0.008 milligrams per cubic metre (8.0×10^{−9} oz/ft^{3}), more than the city average. Sixteen percent of West Farms and Belmont residents are smokers, which is higher than the city average of 14% of residents being smokers. In West Farms and Belmont, 36% of residents are obese, 22% are diabetic, and 32% have high blood pressure—compared to the citywide averages of 24%, 11%, and 28% respectively. In addition, 20% of children are obese, compared to the citywide average of 20%.

Eighty-one percent of residents eat some fruits and vegetables every day, which is less than the city's average of 87%. In 2018, 69% of residents described their health as "good", "very good", or "excellent", lower than the city's average of 78%. For every supermarket in West Farms and Belmont, there are 37 bodegas.

The nearest hospitals are St Barnabas Hospital in Belmont and Bronx-Lebanon Hospital Center in Claremont.

== Post office and ZIP Code ==
West Farms is covered by the ZIP Code 10460. The United States Postal Service operates the West Farms Station at 362 Devoe Avenue.

== Education ==
West Farms and Belmont generally have a lower rate of college-educated residents than the rest of the city as of 2018. While 19% of residents age 25 and older have a college education or higher, 36% have less than a high school education and 45% are high school graduates or have some college education. By contrast, 26% of Bronx residents and 43% of city residents have a college education or higher. The percentage of West Farms and Belmont students excelling in math rose from 19% in 2000 to 44% in 2011, and reading achievement increased from 25% to 30% during the same time period.

West Farms and Belmont's rate of elementary school student absenteeism is more than the rest of New York City. In West Farms and Belmont, 35% of elementary school students missed twenty or more days per school year, higher than the citywide average of 20%. Additionally, 61% of high school students in West Farms and Belmont graduate on time, lower than the citywide average of 75%.

=== Schools ===
Public:

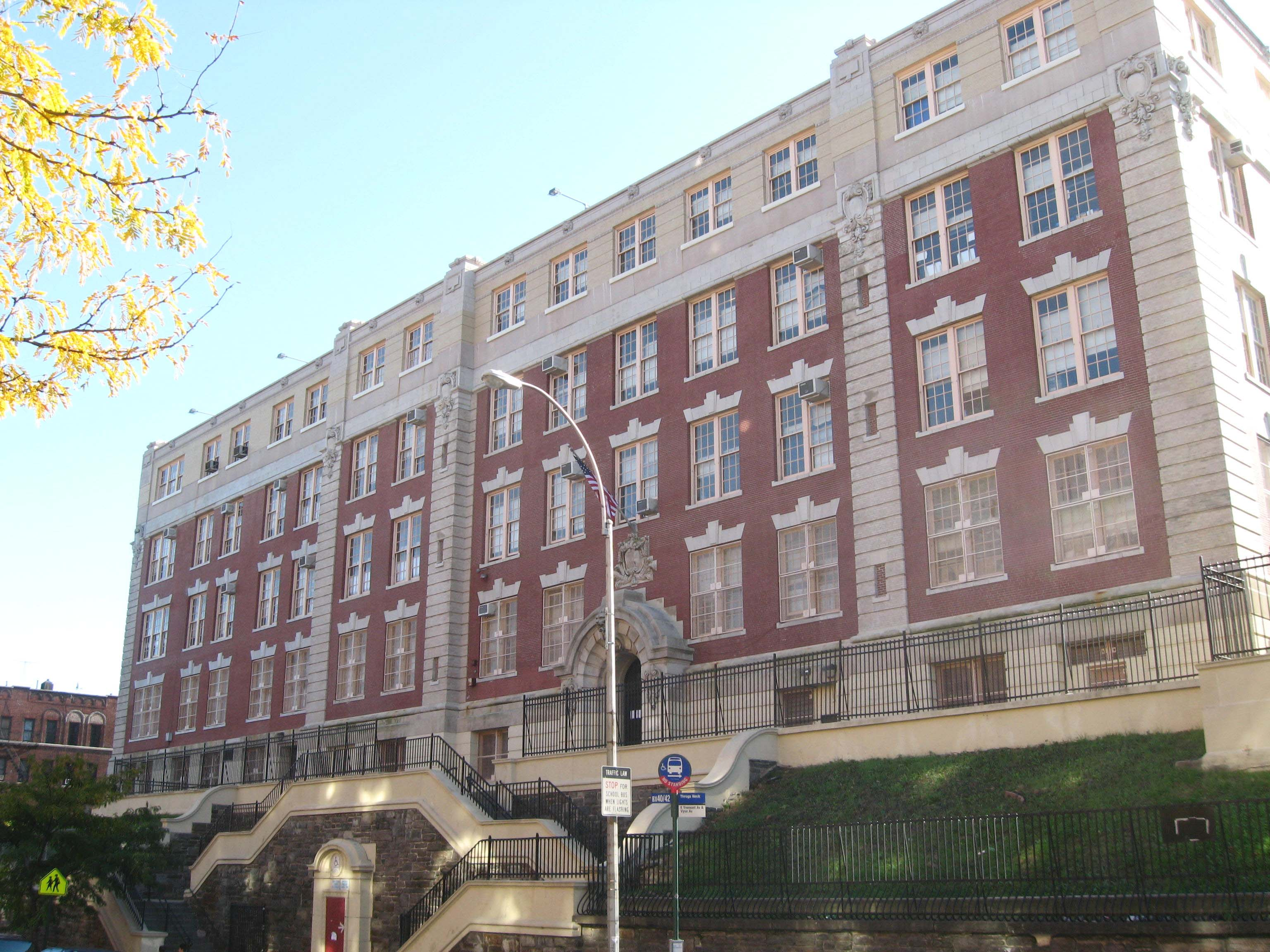
PS 6, East Tremont Avenue

- PS 6: West Farms (East Tremont and Bryant Avenues)
- PS 66: School Of Higher Expectations (Jennings Ave.)
- PS 67: Mohegan (East 178th Street and Mohegan Avenue)
- JHS 98: Herman Ridder (East 173rd Street and Boston Road)
- CS 214: Lorraine Hansberry Academy (West Farms Road and East Tremont Avenue)
- Explorations Academy (East 173rd Street and Boston Road)
- Bronx Envision Academy (East 173rd Street and Boston Road)
- Wings Academy (East 180th Street and Bronx Park Avenue)
- Emolior Academy

Parochial:

- St. Thomas Aquinas School (Daly Avenue)

=== Library ===
The New York Public Library operates the West Farms branch at 2085 Honeywell Avenue. The branch opened in 1929 and moved to its current location in 1954.

== Media ==
The West-Chester Patriot was briefly published in the area beginning in 1813 by Matthias Lopez.

== Transportation ==
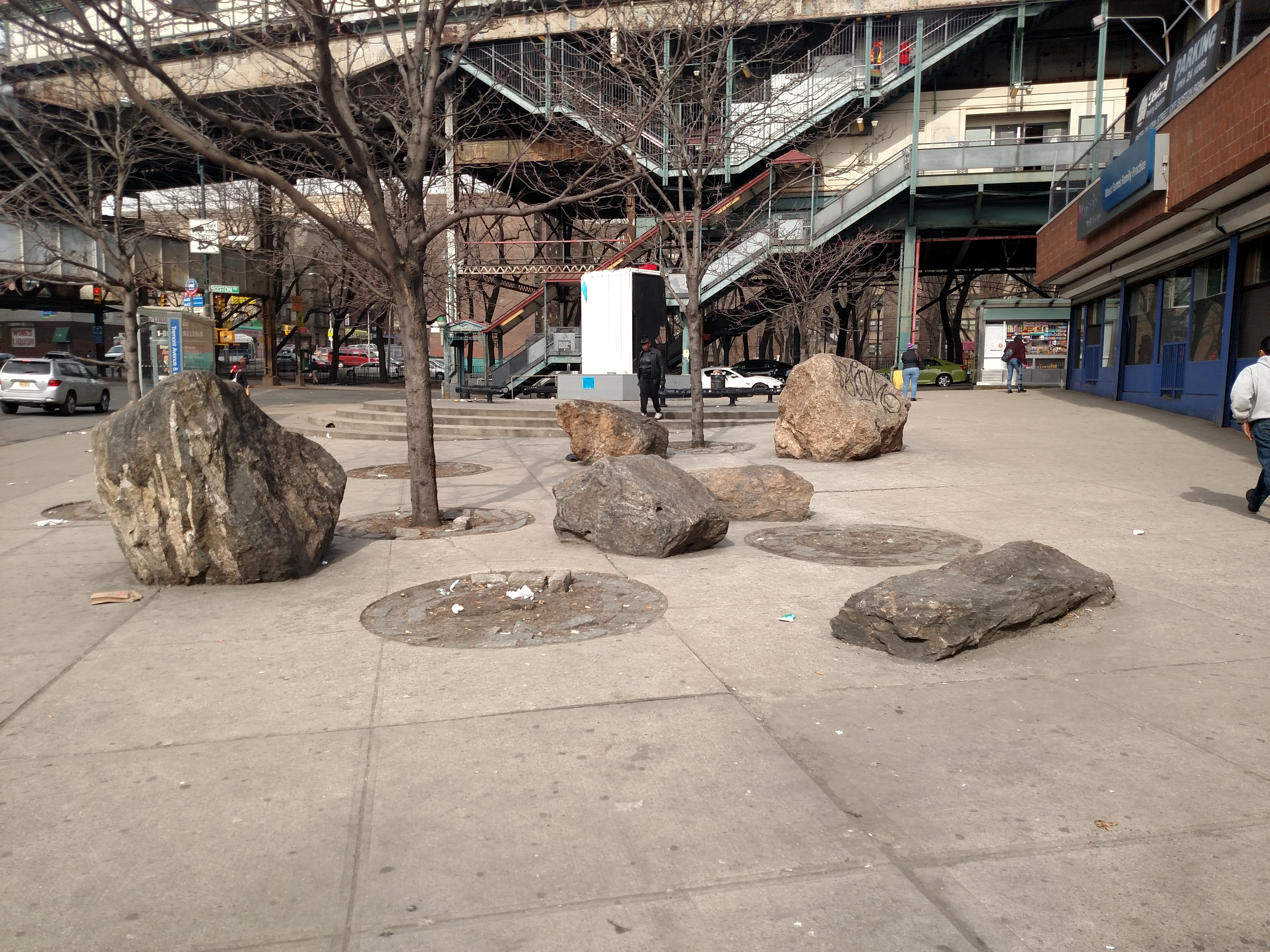
West Farms Square

The following MTA Regional Bus Operations bus routes serve West Farms:

- Bx9: to Riverdale (via Kingsbridge Road)
- Bx19: to Riverbank State Park or New York Botanical Garden (via Southern Blvd) (Border of West Farms and East Tremont)
- Bx21: to Westchester Square station or Third Avenue–138th Street station (via Boston Road and Morris Park Avenue)
- Bx36: to Castle Hill or George Washington Bridge Bus Terminal (via Tremont Avenue)
- Bx40/Bx42: to Throggs Neck or Morris Heights (via 180th Street, Burnside Avenue, Tremont Avenue)
- BxM10: Express Bus Service to Midtown Manhattan
- Q44 SBS: to Jamaica, Whitestone, Flushing (via Cross Bronx Expressway Service Road and Main Street in Queens)

The following New York City Subway stations serve West Farms:

- East 180th Street (2 and 5 trains)
- West Farms Square–East Tremont Avenue (2 and 5 trains)
