= East Tremont, Bronx =

Neighborhood in New York City

East Tremont
- Neighborhood of the Bronx
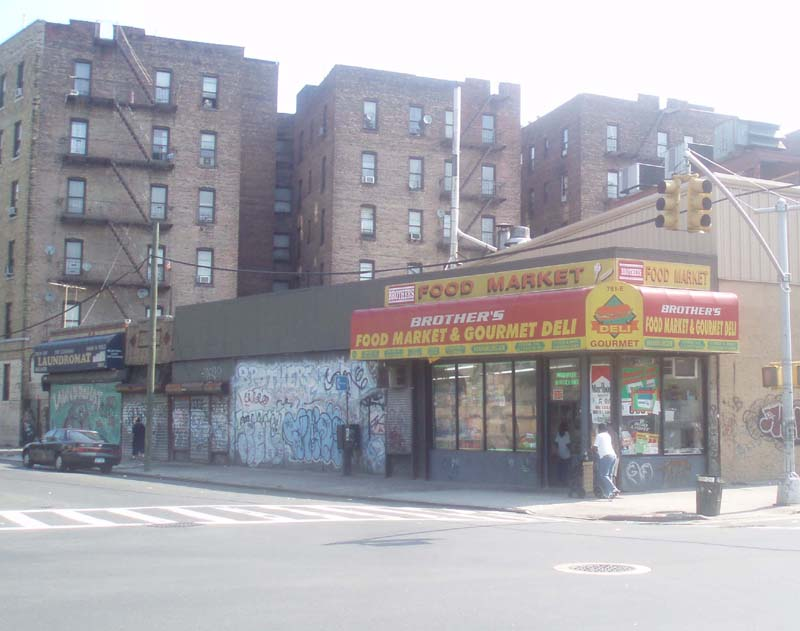
- Looking east across East 182nd Street and Prospect Avenue
- Interactive map of East Tremont
- Coordinates: 40.846°N 73.892°W
- Country: United States
- State: New York
- City: New York City
- Borough: The Bronx
- Community District: Bronx 6

Area
  - Total: 0.436 sq mi (1.13 km^{2})

Population (2010)
  - Total: 43,423
  - Density: 99,600/sq mi (38,500/km^{2})

Economics
  - Median income: $24,443
- Time zone: UTC−05:00 (Eastern (EST))
  - Summer (DST): UTC−04:00 (Eastern (EDT))
- ZIP Codes: 10457, 10460
- Area code: 718, 347, 929, and 917
- Website: www.easttremont.nyc

East Tremont is a residential neighborhood located in the West Bronx, New York City. From the north and moving clockwise, it is bounded by East 180th Street, Southern Boulevard, the Cross Bronx Expressway and Third Avenue. East Tremont Avenue is the primary thoroughfare through the neighborhood.

East Tremont is part of Bronx Community Board 6, and its ZIP Codes include 10457 and 10460. The area is patrolled by the NYPD's 48th Precinct. New York City Housing Authority property in the area is patrolled by P.S.A. 8 at 2794 Randall Avenue in the Throggs Neck section of the Bronx.

== History ==
Part of East Tremont is sometimes called Bronx Park South, particularly the section that lies immediately southwest of the Bronx Zoo. At one time, the land encompassing the neighborhood was owned by the Lorillard Family, known for the Lorillard Tobacco Company.

=== 19th century ===
Starting in the mid 19th Century, East Tremont served as an intermediate step for immigrants from European farms and rural areas, as they climbed the social ladder from poor conditions of the Lower East Side slums to more hospitable neighborhoods. In 1848 the neighborhood attracted German farmers fleeing the Revolutions of 1848; during the 1870s it attracted Irish migrating from the Lower East Side or the famine in Ireland. Around the end of the nineteenth century, Italians spilled over from nearby Belmont, followed by Jews.

=== Mid 20th century ===
In 1950, East Tremont's population numbered an estimated 60,000, with about 441 persons per residential acre. The area was relatively integrated, with about 44,000 Jews, 5,000 Irish, and about 5,000 Germans and Slavs. There were approximately 11,000 "nonwhites" (mostly Blacks and Puerto Ricans) in the neighborhood, about 18% of the population.

East Tremont's large population of Jews had mostly migrated from Lower East Side slums, looking for a better neighborhood. The East Tremont neighborhood was modest but considered affordable and safe by its residents. Rents in 1950 were as low as $100 or even $62 per month for four rooms; comparable apartments in Jewish neighborhoods like Pelham Parkway closer to $350 per month. East Tremont Avenue was a bustling retail area with bakeries, kosher butcher shops, mom-and-pop candy stores, delicatessens, and clothing stores. While East Tremont contained no playgrounds, residents enjoyed easy access to nearby Crotona Park. The local Young Men's Hebrew Association was a center of civic life; it listed over 400 senior citizens and 1,700 families as active members. The schools were old and worn (PS44, the junior high school, had been built in 1901), but academic standards were high.

=== The Cross-Bronx Expressway ===
In his book The Power Broker, author Robert Caro devotes two chapters to the "One Mile" of the Cross-Bronx Expressway which ran through East Tremont. Caro argues that the expressway caused permanent damage to the neighborhood fabric. During the five years of construction, 5,000 residents were displaced and many stores demolished. The mile was completed in 1960. Quality of life in the neighborhood rapidly declined due to the noise and fumes from the highway, and physical fracturing of the neighborhood. By 1965, apartment buildings in the area around the expressway had become "ravaged hulks" with broken windows, graffiti, and broken plaster. Pipes were vandalized, staircases broke down, elevators stopped working, crime and vandalism had increased, gangs started to move into the area, addiction rates rose, and stores closed. An estimated 10,000 residents fled the neighborhood as it declined.

Recent scholarship has questioned Caro's portrayal of the Cross-Bronx Expressway's impact on East Tremont's development. Historian Michael Dimitrios Caratzas considers the expressway's relevance to the neighborhood's decline in the 1970s and 80s "tangential." Furthermore, Professor Ray Bromley's article, "Not So Simple! Caro, Moses, and the Impact of the Cross-Bronx Expressway" contests that Caro exaggerated the impact of the expressway on the community to exemplify Robert Moses' personal political power.

== Demographics ==
Based on data from the 2010 United States census, the population of East Tremont was 43,423, an increase of 4,143 (10.5%) from the 39,280 counted in 2000. Covering an area of 445.31 acres (180.21 ha), the neighborhood had a population density of 97.5 inhabitants per acre (62,400/sq mi; 24,100/km^{2}).

The racial makeup of the neighborhood was 1.4% (627) White, 29.4% (12,750) African American, 0.3% (110) Native American, 0.5% (229) Asian, 0.0% (4) Pacific Islander, 0.3% (150) from other races, and 0.8% (333) from two or more races. Hispanic or Latino of any race were 67.3% (29,220) of the population.

The neighborhood predominately consists of Latin Americans (East Tremont has one of the highest concentrations of Puerto Ricans in New York City) and African Americans. There is a small but growing Dominican population. Almost half the population lives below the poverty line and receives public assistance (AFDC, Home Relief, Supplemental Security Income, and Medicaid). Most households are renter occupied. The entirety of Community District 6, which comprises East Tremont and Belmont, had 87,476 inhabitants as of NYC Health's 2018 Community Health Profile, with an average life expectancy of 77.7 years. This is lower than the median life expectancy of 81.2 for all New York City neighborhoods. Most inhabitants are youth and middle-aged adults: 29% are between the ages of between 0–17, 28% between 25 and 44, and 20% between 45 and 64. The ratio of college-aged and elderly residents was lower, at 14% and 9% respectively.

As of 2017, the median household income in Community Districts 3 and 6, including Crotona Park East and Morrisania, was $25,972. In 2018, an estimated 31% of East Tremont and Belmont residents lived in poverty, compared to 25% in all of the Bronx and 20% in all of New York City. One in six residents (16%) were unemployed, compared to 13% in the Bronx and 9% in New York City. Rent burden, or the percentage of residents who have difficulty paying their rent, is 60% in East Tremont and Belmont, compared to the boroughwide and citywide rates of 58% and 51% respectively. Based on this calculation, as of 2018, East Tremont and Belmont are gentrifying.

== Land use and terrain ==
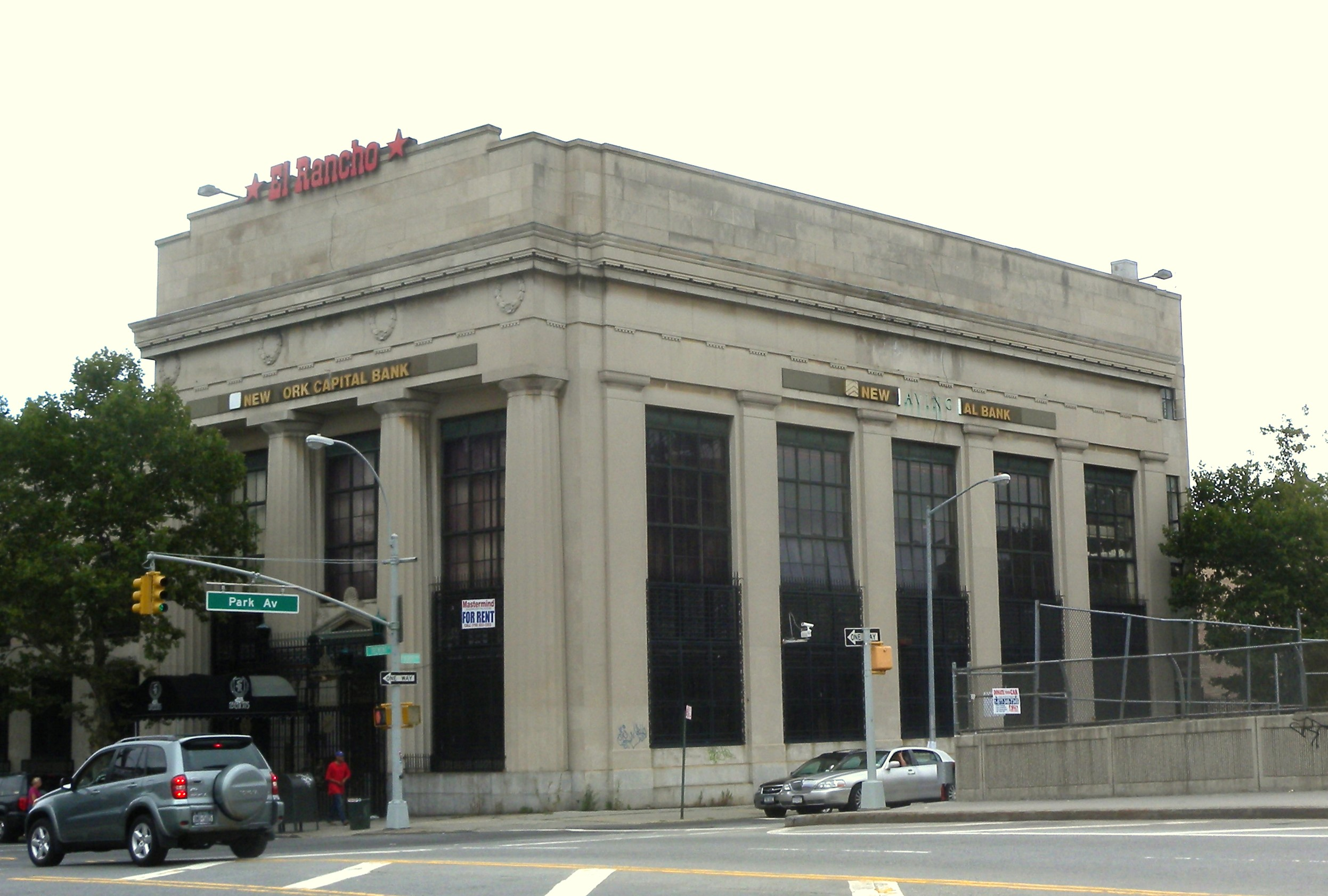
Looking northwest across Park and Tremont Avenues in East Tremont, at former bank building

East Tremont is dominated by five and six story tenement buildings, older multi-unit homes, vacant lots, and newly constructed apartment buildings. Most of the original housing stock was structurally damaged by arson and eventually razed by the city. The land area, somewhat hilly, is less than one square mile.

There are two NYCHA developments located in East Tremont.

1. Twin Roads East (Site 9); one, 14-story building.
2. East 180th Street-Monterey Avenue; one, 10-story building.

== Police and crime ==
East Tremont and Belmont are patrolled by the 48th Precinct of the NYPD, located at 450 Cross Bronx Expressway. The 48th Precinct ranked 56th safest out of 69 patrol areas for per-capita crime in 2010. As of 2018, with a non-fatal assault rate of 152 per 100,000 people, East Tremont and Belmont's rate of violent crimes per capita is greater than that of the city as a whole. The incarceration rate of 1,015 per 100,000 people is higher than that of the city as a whole.

The 48th Precinct has a lower crime rate than in the 1990s, with crimes across all categories having decreased by 60.9% between 1990 and 2022. The precinct reported 14 murders, 26 rapes, 447 robberies, 646 felony assaults, 252 burglaries, 467 grand larcenies, and 304 grand larcenies auto in 2022.

== Fire safety ==
East Tremont is served by two New York City Fire Department (FDNY) fire stations: Engine Co. 46/Ladder Co. 27 at 460 Cross Bronx Expressway, and Engine Co. 45/Ladder Co. 58/Battalion 18 at 925 East Tremont Avenue.

== Health ==
As of 2018, preterm births and births to teenage mothers are more common in East Tremont and Belmont than in other places citywide. In East Tremont and Belmont, there were 113 preterm births per 1,000 live births (compared to 87 per 1,000 citywide), and 30.4 births to teenage mothers per 1,000 live births (compared to 19.3 per 1,000 citywide). East Tremont and Belmont has a relatively average population of residents who are uninsured. In 2018, this population of uninsured residents was estimated to be 12%, equal to the citywide rate of 12%.

The concentration of fine particulate matter, the deadliest type of air pollutant, in East Tremont and Belmont is 0.008 milligrams per cubic metre (8.0×10^{−9} oz/ft^{3}), more than the city average. Sixteen percent of East Tremont and Belmont residents are smokers, which is higher than the city average of 14% of residents being smokers. In East Tremont and Belmont, 36% of residents are obese, 22% are diabetic, and 32% have high blood pressure—compared to the citywide averages of 24%, 11%, and 28% respectively. In addition, 20% of children are obese, compared to the citywide average of 20%.

Eighty-one percent of residents eat some fruits and vegetables every day, which is less than the city's average of 87%. In 2018, 69% of residents described their health as "good", "very good", or "excellent", lower than the city's average of 78%. For every supermarket in East Tremont and Belmont, there are 37 bodegas.

The nearest hospitals are St Barnabas Hospital in Belmont and Bronx-Lebanon Hospital Center in Claremont.

== Post offices and ZIP Codes ==
East Tremont is covered by the ZIP Codes 10457 west of Prospect Avenue and 10460 east of Prospect Avenue. The United States Postal Service operates two post offices nearby: the Tremont Station at 757 East Tremont Avenue.

== Education ==
East Tremont and Belmont generally have a lower rate of college-educated residents than the rest of the city as of 2018. While 19% of residents age 25 and older have a college education or higher, 36% have less than a high school education and 45% are high school graduates or have some college education. By contrast, 26% of Bronx residents and 43% of city residents have a college education or higher. The percentage of East Tremont and Belmont students excelling in math rose from 19% in 2000 to 44% in 2011, and reading achievement increased from 25% to 30% during the same time period.

East Tremont and Belmont's rate of elementary school student absenteeism is more than the rest of New York City. In East Tremont and Belmont, 35% of elementary school students missed twenty or more days per school year, higher than the citywide average of 20%. Additionally, 61% of high school students in East Tremont and Belmont graduate on time, lower than the citywide average of 75%.

=== Schools ===
All are public schools.

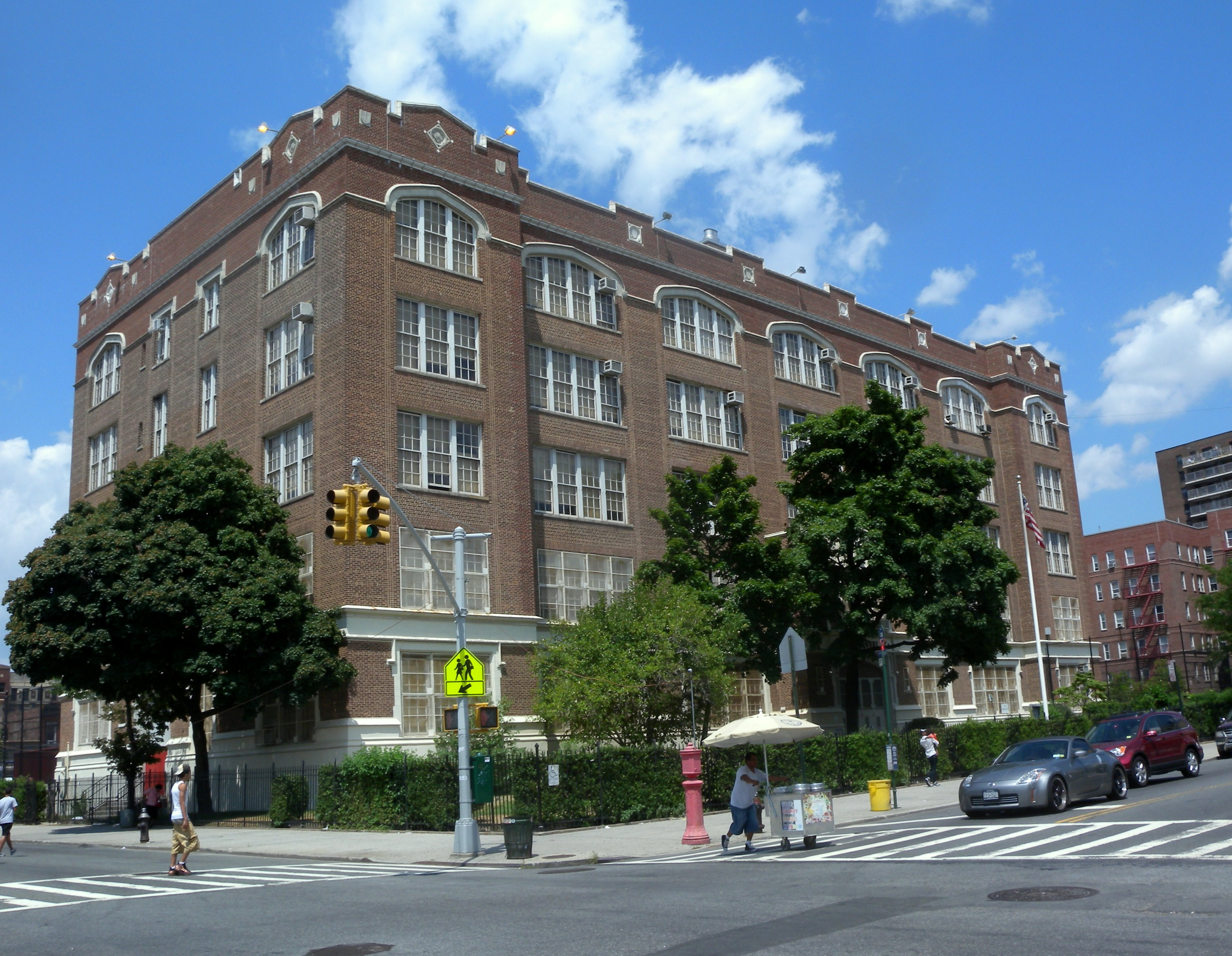
PS 57

- PS/MS 3: Raul Julia (East 180th St and LaFontaine Av)
- PS 23: Early Childhood (East 181st St and Washington Av)
- PS 32: Belmont (East 183rd St and Belmont Av)
- PS 44: David Farragut (East 176th St and Prospect Av)
- PS 57: Crescent/Frederick Douglass Academy V (East 180th St and Crotona Av)
- PS 58: Tremont Park (East 176th St and Washington Av)
- PS 59: Bathgate (East 182nd St and Bathgate Av)
- PS 92: (East 179th St and Clinton Av)
- PS/MS 211: The Bilingual School (Fairmount Place and Prospect Av)
- PS 300/MS 129/P10/IS 316: Twin Parks (East 180th St and Mapes Av)
- MS 118: William J. Niles (East 179th St and Arthur Av)
- MS/HS 231: Eagle Academy for Young Men (East 176th St and 3rd Av)

=== Library ===
The New York Public Library operates the Tremont branch at 1866 Washington Avenue. The branch, a Carnegie library designed by Carrère and Hastings in the Italian Renaissance style, was opened in 1905.

== Transportation ==
There are no New York City Subway stations in East Tremont, though several bus routes connect with subway stations. The following MTA Regional Bus Operations bus routes serve East Tremont:

- Bx9: to Riverdale or West Farms (via Kingsbridge Road/Broadway)
- Bx15: to Fordham Plaza or The Hub (via Third Avenue)
- Bx17: to Fordham Plaza or Port Morris (via Crotona and Prospect Avenues)
- Bx19: to New York Botanical Garden or Riverbank State Park (via Southern Boulevard/149th Street)
- Bx36: to Castle Hill or George Washington Bridge Bus Terminal (via Tremont Avenue)
- Bx40: to SUNY Maritime College or Morris Heights (via 180th Street, Tremont and Burnside Avenues)
- Bx41: to Gun Hill Road station or Third Avenue – 149th Street station (via Webster Avenue)
- Bx42: to Throggs Neck or Morris Heights (via 180th Street, Tremont and Burnside Avenues)

The Metro-North Railroad's Harlem Line also serves East Tremont at the Tremont station.
