= Bx40 and Bx42 buses =

Bus routes in the Bronx, New York

bx40, bx42
- East 180th Street Line; Burnside Avenue/East 180th Street/East Tremont Avenue
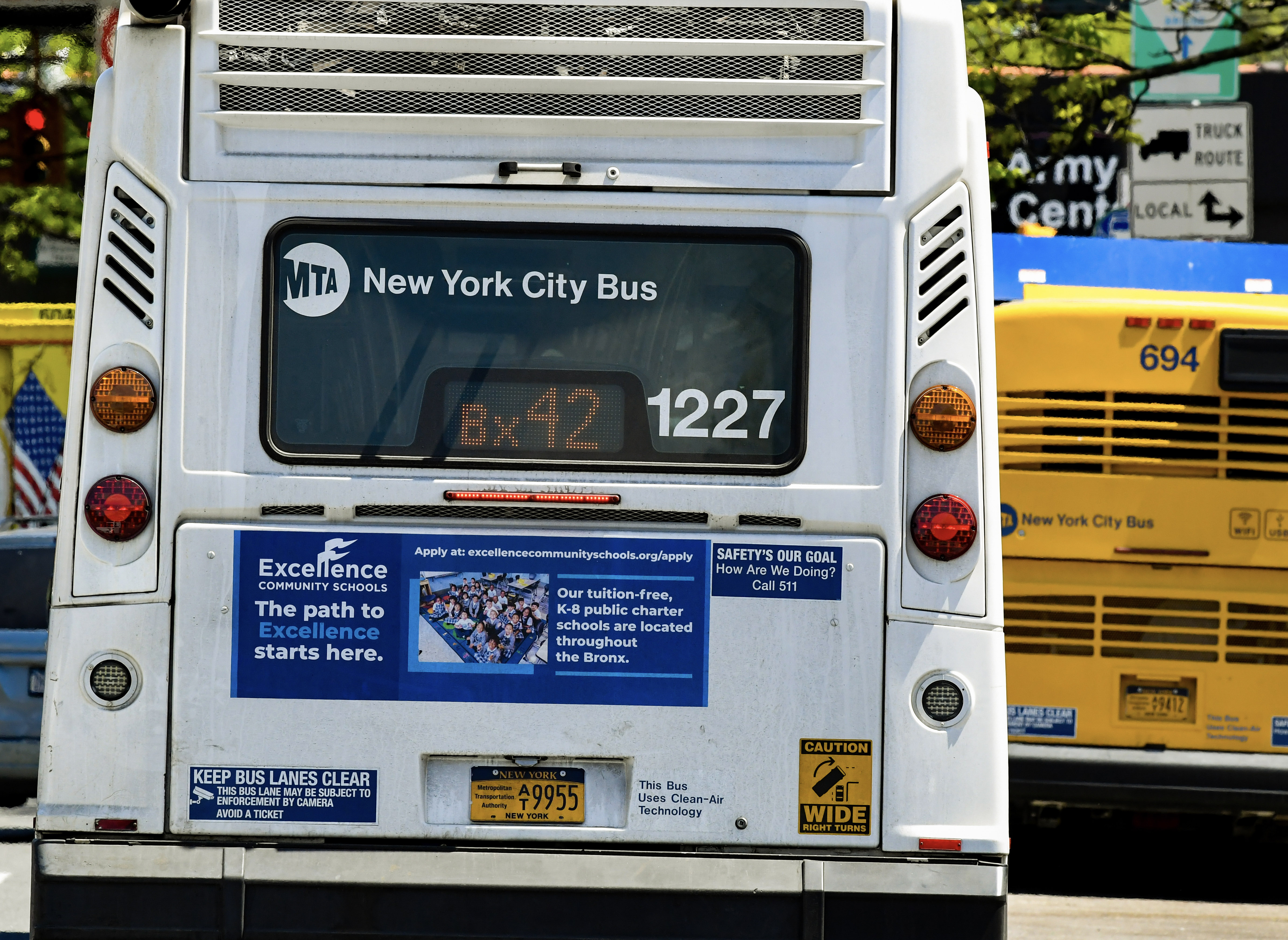
- A 2010 Nova Bus LFS Articulated (1227) on the Bx42 at Westchester Square

Overview
- System: MTA Regional Bus Operations
- Operator: Manhattan and Bronx Surface Transit Operating Authority
- Garage: Gun Hill Depot
- Vehicle: Nova Bus LFS articulated New Flyer Xcelsior XD60 (main vehicles); Nova Bus LFS; Nova Bus LFS HEV; New Flyer Xcelsior XD40; New Flyer Xcelsior XE40 (supplemental service)
- Began service: April 1928 (Bx40); September 1989 (Bx42)

Route
- Locale: The Bronx, New York, U.S.
- Communities served: Morris Heights, Tremont, East Tremont, West Farms, Van Nest, Parkchester, Westchester Square, Schuylerville, Throggs Neck
- Start: Morris Heights - Sedgwick Avenue & Cedar Avenue (River Park Towers)
- Via: Burnside Avenue, East 180th Street, East Tremont Avenue
- End: Throggs Neck - SUNY Maritime College (Bx40); Throggs Neck - Harding Avenue & Emerson Avenue (Bx42)
- Length: 8.4 miles (13.5 km) (Bx40); 8.6 miles (13.8 km) (Bx42)

Service
- Operates: 24 hours (Bx40); All times except late nights (Bx42)
- Annual patronage: 2,518,440 (2025)
- Transfers: Yes
- Timetable: Bx40/42

The Bx40 and Bx42 bus routes constitute a public transit line between River Park Towers in Morris Heights and the neighborhood of Throggs Neck, running primarily along Burnside Avenue, East 180th Street and East Tremont Avenue.

== Route ==
The Bx40 and Bx42 start on Sedgwick Avenue near River Park Towers. Eastbound buses run north on Cedar Avenue, using 179th Street to get to Burnside Avenue whereas westbound buses turn south on Sedgwick Avenue from Burnside Avenue. It then runs east on Burnside Avenue, using University Avenue for a short portion where Burnside Avenue is discontinuous. After reaching Valentine Avenue, eastbound buses run north on Valentine Avenue, turning onto East 180th Street and running on Webster Avenue for a short portion where East 180th Street is discontinuous. Westbound buses take a different routing, running south on Webster Avenue, west on 178th Street and north on Valentine Avenue to Burnside Avenue. It continues on East 180th Street as it merges into East Tremont Avenue, continuing until Randall Avenue, where the Bx40 continues straight on Tremont Avenue and the Bx42 detours to serve the Throggs Neck Houses via Randall Avenue, Balcom Avenue and Dewey Avenue. After rejoining the Bx40 at Tremont Avenue, they both continue south to Harding Avenue, where they split again. Bx42 heads west on Harding Avenue to terminate at its western end by Emerson Avenue. Bx40 heads east on Harding Avenue before turning south on Pennyfield Avenue to terminate on the southern end at SUNY Maritime College.

=== School trippers ===
When school is in session, one Bx40 trip originates at a school complex at Tremont Avenue & Ericson Place. This trip departs at 3:30pm and operates the rest of its eastbound route. In addition, two buses depart from Preston High School at Schurz/Huntington Avenues and head to their regular westbound routes via Schurz and Tremont Avenues. The 3pm trip is signed as the Bx40 and the 3:45pm trip is signed as the Bx42.

== History ==
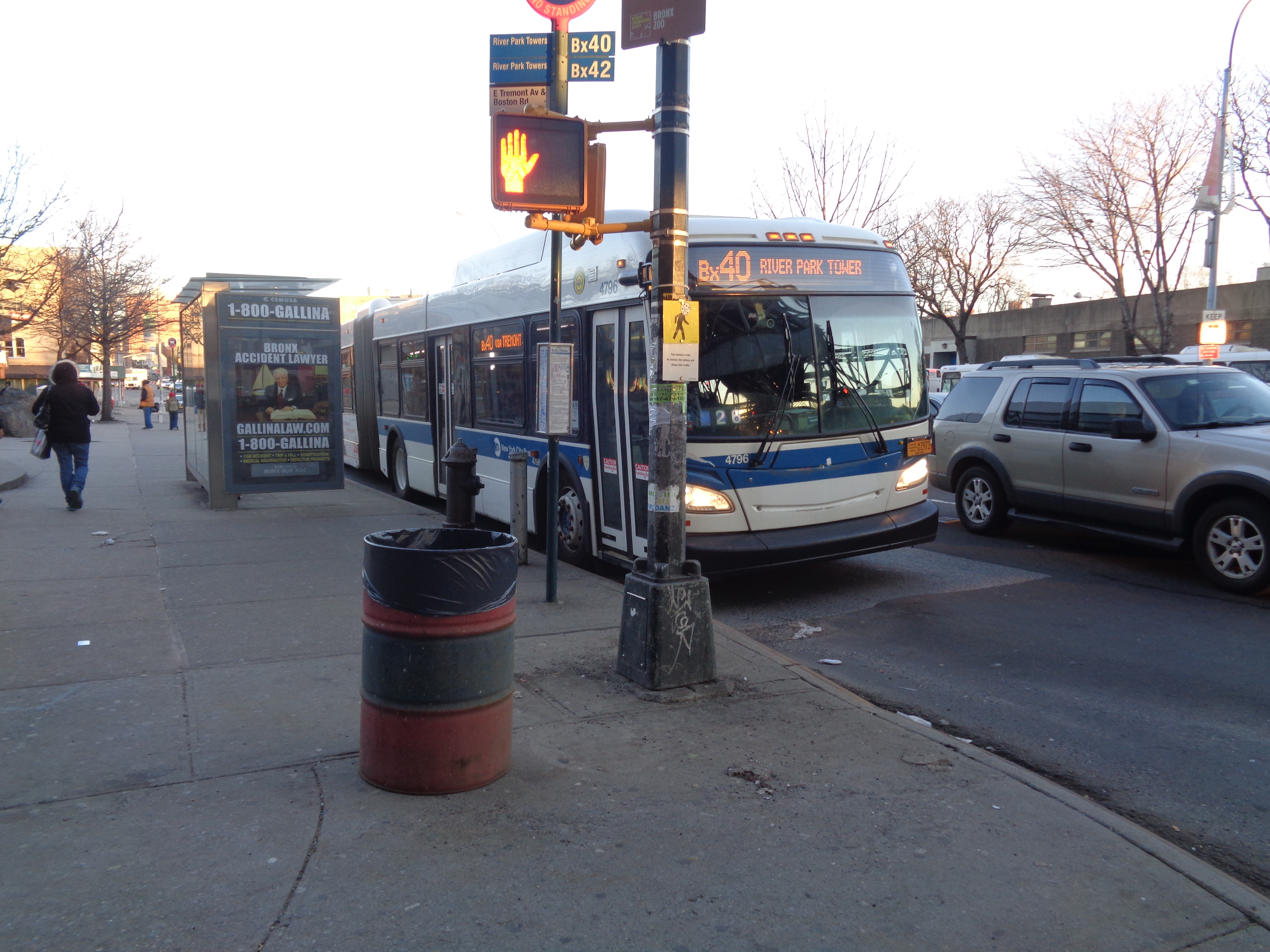
A 2013 XD60 (4796) on the River Park Towers-bound Bx40 at West Farms Square, prior to the implementation of the Bronx Bus Redesign

The Bx40 was started in April 1928, running between Fort Schuyler and branching out to Pelham Bay or Westchester Square.

On August 21, 1948, it was restructured to replace the Tremont Avenue Line streetcars, running between Burnside Avenue-Sedgwick Avenue and Bruckner Boulevard-Balcom Avenue.

As part of route renumbering in the Bronx, the Bx40 merged with the Bx6/6A/6B/6C on July 1, 1974, giving the route four different southern branches to Edgewater Park, Fort Schuyler (both former Bx6), Locust Point (former Bx6A), Harding Avenue (former Bx6B) and Throgs Neck Houses (former Bx6C) with service to Bruckner Boulevard-Balcom Avenue discontinued.

Service was extended on the western end to River Park Towers in February 1984. In September 1989, service to Harding Avenue and Throgs Neck Houses were merged into a new designation, the Bx42, which also ran to River Park Towers, however, service on Harding Avenue was truncated from Davis Avenue to Balcom Avenue on the same day. Service to Edgewater Park and Locust Point where replaced by a rerouted Bx8 as well.

The Bx40 originally ran via Lawton Avenue between Tremont Avenue and Pennyfield Avenue until June 30, 2002, until being rerouted to use Harding Avenue on June 30, 2002, due to Lawton Avenue being narrow and having an uneven surface. The Bx42 was extended from Balcom Avenue to Emerson Avenue in November 2006.

In May 2019, the MTA released their draft plan for the Bronx Bus Network Redesign. As part of the plan, Bx40 service be truncated to Tremont Avenue-Harding Avenue and rerouted to use East 180th Street between Webster Avenue and East 180th Street-Tremont Avenue. The Bx42 would truncated on its northern end to Westchester Square and also be rerouted south on Balcom Avenue and east on Harding Avenue to replace Bx40 service to Fort Schuyler, with service on Dewey Avenue and Harding Avenue west of Balcom Avenue discontinued, similar to the old Bx6 that was merged into the Bx40 in July 1974. In October of the same year, the final plan was released. The Bx40 and Bx42 changes in Throgs Neck were removed, but the reroute via East 180th Street stayed in the final plan. The changes were delayed due to the COVID-19 pandemic in New York City, with the changes being implemented on June 26, 2022.
