= Tremont Avenue station =

New York City Subway station in the Bronx

Tremont Avenue
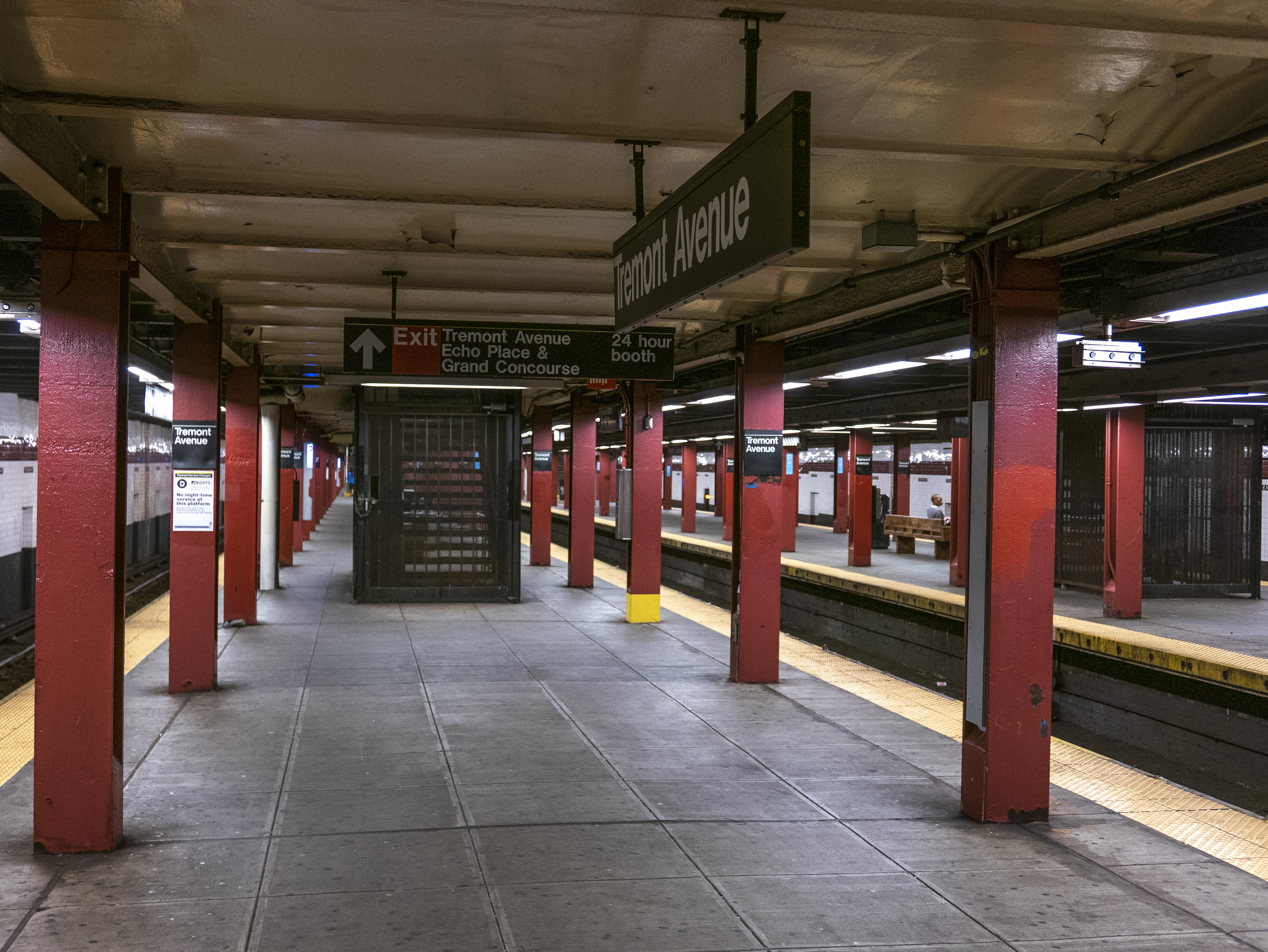
- View from northbound platform

Station statistics
- Address: East Tremont Avenue & Grand Concourse; Bronx, New York
- Borough: The Bronx
- Locale: Tremont
- Coordinates: 40.849463°N 73.905973°W
- Division: B (IND)
- Line: IND Concourse Line
- Services: B (weekdays only); D (all times)
- Transit: NYCT Bus: Bx1, Bx2, Bx36; MTA Bus: BxM4
- Structure: Underground
- Platforms: 2 island platforms cross-platform interchange
- Tracks: 3

Other information
- Opened: July 1, 1933; 93 years ago
- Accessible: Yes

Traffic
- 2025: 1,746,563 ▲34.8%
- Rank: 204 out of 423
Services
Preceding station	New York City Subway	Following station
Fordham Road D express	D (New York City Subway service)	145th Street D express
182nd–183rd Streets B D toward Norwood–205th Street	D (New York City Subway service)	174th–175th Streets B D toward Coney Island–Stillwell Avenue
Location
Location within New York City Subway
Location within New York City
Location within New York
Track layout
Street map
Station service legend
Symbol	Description
Stops all times except rush hours in the peak direction	Stops all times except rush hours in the peak direction
Stops all times	Stops all times
Stops rush hours only	Stops rush hours only
Stops weekdays during the day	Stops weekdays during the day

The Tremont Avenue station is an express station on the IND Concourse Line of the New York City Subway. Located at the intersection of East Tremont Avenue and Grand Concourse, it is served by the D train at all times and B train weekdays only. It has three tracks and two island platforms.

== History ==
This station was built as part of the IND Concourse Line, which was one of the original lines of the city-owned Independent Subway System (IND). The route of the Concourse Line was approved to Bedford Park Boulevard on June 12, 1925 by the New York City Board of Transportation. Construction of the line began in July 1928. The station opened on July 1, 1933, along with the rest of the Concourse subway.

In 2019, the Metropolitan Transportation Authority announced that this station would become ADA-accessible as part of the agency's 2020–2024 Capital Program. An elevator was installed to the southeast corner of Echo Place and Grand Concourse. An alternate proposal for the installation of the elevator to the street would have placed it at the southwest corner of that intersection. Two elevators lead from the southern fare control area to the two platforms. The elevators were opened on February 27, 2024.

== Station layout ==
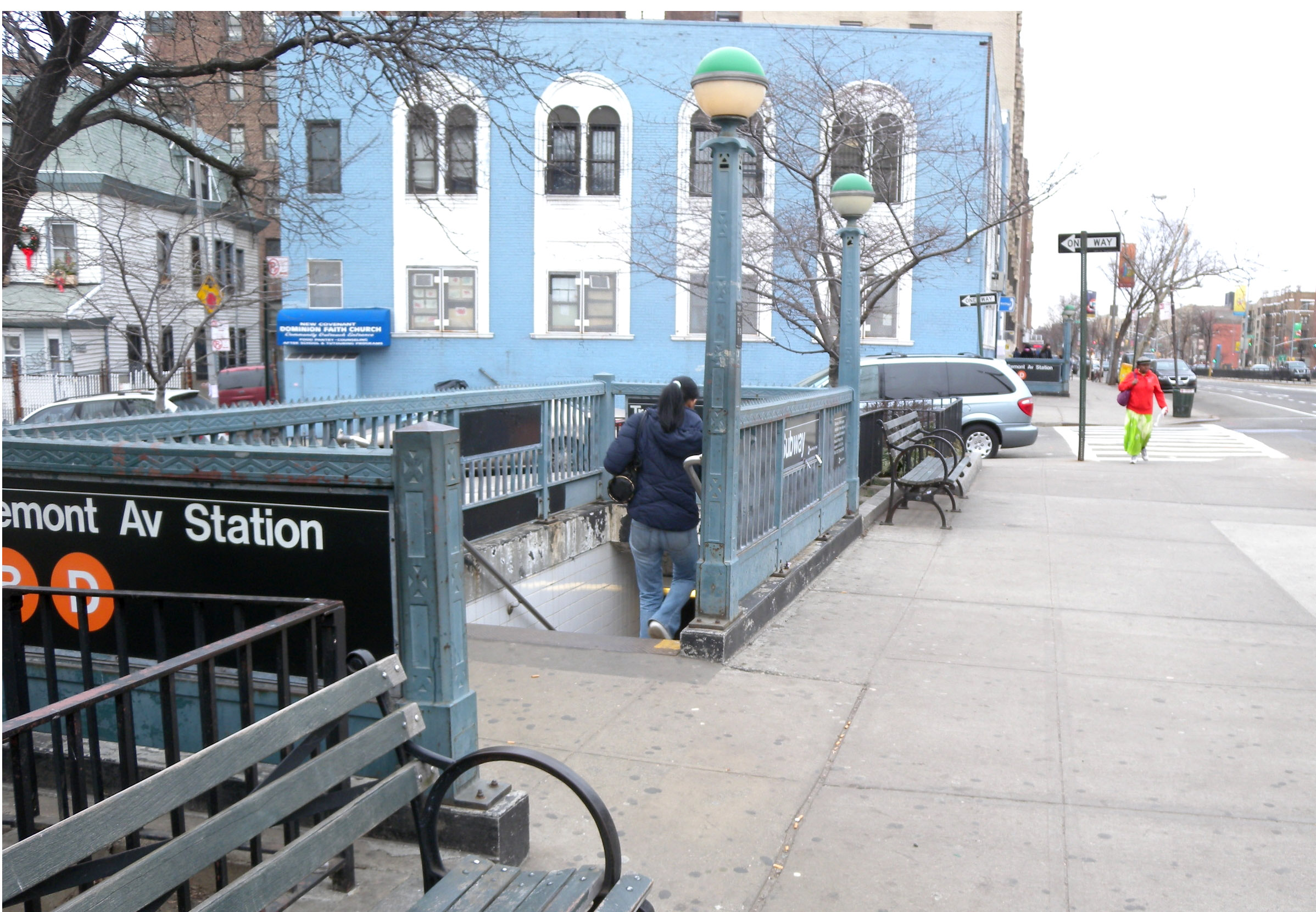
Northwestern street stair

The tile band is Claret red and the name mosaics are replicas of the 1933 originals. The I-beams were originally painted a shade of red to match, but they were repainted black during the installation of elevators at the station. Tile bands are also present in the mezzanines, and matching "T" (for Tremont) plaques have been fitted—the only IND station to feature these. A closed tower sits on the south end of the Manhattan-bound platform.

The 2000 artwork here is called Uptown New York by Frank Leslie Hampton. It uses a mixture of glass and marble mosaics to create a full-width display of a Bronx apartment building with a rooftop garden, and clothes hanging out on a line to dry on a cloudy day. This mural is as wide as the mezzanine and faces the full-time booth area.

=== Exits ===
The station had a full length mezzanine above the platforms. However, after a 1999 renovation, it was split into three sections. The northernmost and southernmost portions are separate fare control areas, and the central portion is now used as a storage area.

In January 1992, the MTA proposed closing the free zone passageway on the east side of the station, connecting to the station entrances at Tremont Avenue and East 179th Street; prior to the station renovation, it was gated off. The middle portion as well as the passageways on the east and west sides have been walled off to the public.

The full-time booth is in the southern portion. It has three street stairs leading to all corners except the southeast corner of Grand Concourse and Echo Place, and two stairs to each platform. The street stair on the west side has a small passageway. The elevator is located on the southeast corner of Grand Concourse and Echo Place. The part-time side at the northern portion. It had its booth removed during the aforementioned renovation, has two street stairs, one to each side of the Concourse at 179th Street, and has two stairs to each platform.
