= Throgs Neck Light =

Lighthouse in the Bronx, New York

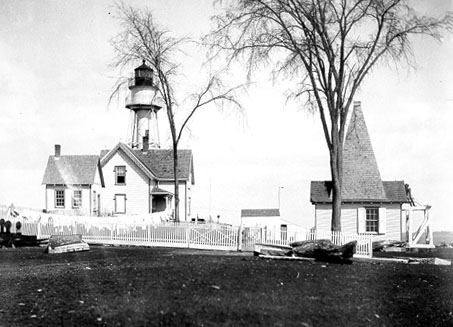
- Throgs Neck Lighthouse in 1890
- Location: Throgs Neck in New York
- Coordinates: 40°48′16″N 73°47′26″W

Tower
- Constructed: 1827
- Height: 17 m (56 ft)
- Shape: Square pyramidal
- Markings: White
- Fog signal: Bell every 15 seconds

Light
- First lit: 1906
- Deactivated: 1934
- Focal height: 18 m (59 ft)
- Lens: 1890: Fifth Order Fresnel lens, 1906: Fourth Order Fresnel lens
- Characteristic: Fixed Red

Throgs Neck Light in Throggs Neck, the Bronx, New York, was a wooden lighthouse that was replaced by an iron skeletal tower that is still there. The lighthouse protects ships in the Long Island Sound from running up against the rocks.

The lighthouse is located on the northeasterly side of Fort Schuyler, southeasterly end of Throgs Neck and on the northerly side of the entrance from Long Island Sound into the East River.

- Tower Shape / Markings / Pattern: White, square, pyramidal,
- skeleton iron tower; lantern, black (1890); Red brick cylindrical tower (1906)
- Height: 64 1/4 feet (19.6 m) (1890); 35 feet (11 m) (1906)

== Chronology ==
- Original wooden lighthouse established in 1827. It was torn down during the construction of the fort.
- A new wooden tower replaced the original lighthouse in 1835. It remained in service until 1890.
- Replaced by a skeletal tower in 1890.
- An oil house was built in 1896.
- Skeletal tower replaced in 1906 with a 35-foot red brick tower. Its location was 700 feet (210 m) southwest of the old light.
- Light discontinued in 1934 and replaced by a small skeleton tower surmounted with a small signal lamp.
