= Tremont Avenue =

Avenue in the Bronx, New York

Coordinates: 40.84946°N 73.90604°W

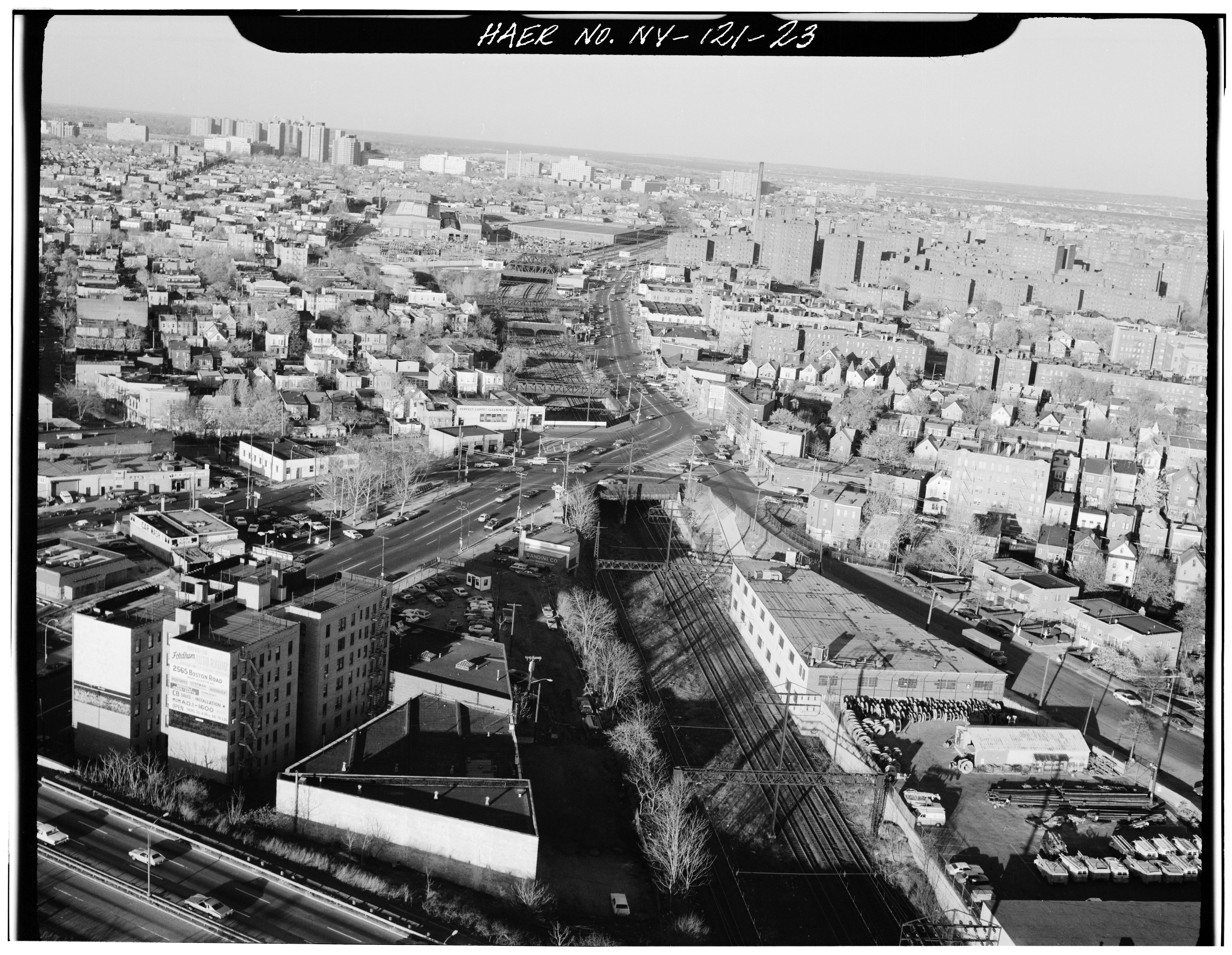
- East Tremont Avenue Bridge crossing a rail line at East 180th Street
- Owner: City of New York
- Maintained by: NYCDOT
- Length: 7.0 mi (11.3 km)
- Location: The Bronx, New York City
- West end: Matthewson Road in Morris Heights
- Major junctions: US 1 in Tremont; Hutchinson River Parkway in Schuylerville; I-95 in Throggs Neck
- East end: Schurz Avenue in Throggs Neck

Tremont Avenue is a street in the Bronx, New York City. Its west end is at Matthewson Road at Roberto Clemente State Park in Morris Heights, which then becomes a step street after Cedar Avenue. At the top of the step street at Sedgwick Avenue it continues east, and its east end is at Schurz Avenue in Throggs Neck, running almost the entire width of the Bronx. The street is officially divided into East and West sections by Jerome Avenue.

A historical marker near Dock Street at 2900 East Tremont Avenue commemorates the Battle of Throgs Neck (or Throg's Point), a small but pivotal military engagement of the American Revolutionary War, in which a small American detachment repelled the British attempt to trap Washington on Manhattan, buying him time to retreat from New York City towards White Plains.

Around 2009, part of East Tremont Avenue was designated as Hector Lavoe Avenue, in honor of the late salsa musician.

The following New York City Subway stations serve Tremont Avenue:

- Tremont Avenue (B and D trains) at Grand Concourse
- West Farms Square–East Tremont Avenue (2 and 5 trains) at Boston Road
- Westchester Square–East Tremont Avenue (6 and <6> trains) at Westchester Avenue
- Parkchester/Van Nest station is a planned Metro-North Railroad station on the New Haven Line, which is intended to open in late 2027 as part of the Metropolitan Transportation Authority’s Penn Station Access project. Located on the border of Van Nest on Tremont Avenue and just north of Parkchester’s border on White Plains Road, the station would provide commuter rail service to New York Penn Station in Midtown Manhattan and to stations in Connecticut and Westchester County. The entrance is to be located on Tremont Avenue, east of Unionport Road.
- Tremont station is a commuter rail stop on the Metro-North Railroad's Harlem Line.

MTA Regional Bus Operations operates several local bus routes along Tremont Avenue:

- The majority of East Tremont Avenue is served by the Bx40 and Bx42 bus routes between East 180th Street and Harding Avenue. Only the Bx42 heads west on Harding and it is absent between Randall and Dewey Avenues. Express service is also provided by the BxM9 south of Randall.
- The segment between White Plains Road and University Avenue is served by the Bx36 bus.
- The segment west of University Avenue is served by the Bx18 buses, Bx18A westbound and Bx18B eastbound.
- The Bx21 runs between Boston Road and Morris Park Avenue, along with the BxM10 east of, and the Riverdale-bound Bx9 and Jamaica-bound Q44 Select Bus Service west of, Devoe Avenue.
  - The Bx9 is out of service until East 177th Street.
- The Bx4A runs between Castle Hill Avenue, and either Westchester Avenue (Westchester Square) or Lane Avenue (The Hub), both of which are served non-stop by the Hub-bound Bx4.
- The Bx8, Bx24 and Bx31 run only in the Westchester Square section of East Tremont Avenue in both directions. The Bx31 always terminates here, as well as some Bx8 trips.

In August 2026, the city government began constructing a busway on Tremont Avenue between Third Avenue and Southern Boulevard.
