= Bronx Community Board 6 =

Bronx Community District 6 Bronx Community Board 6
- Community District
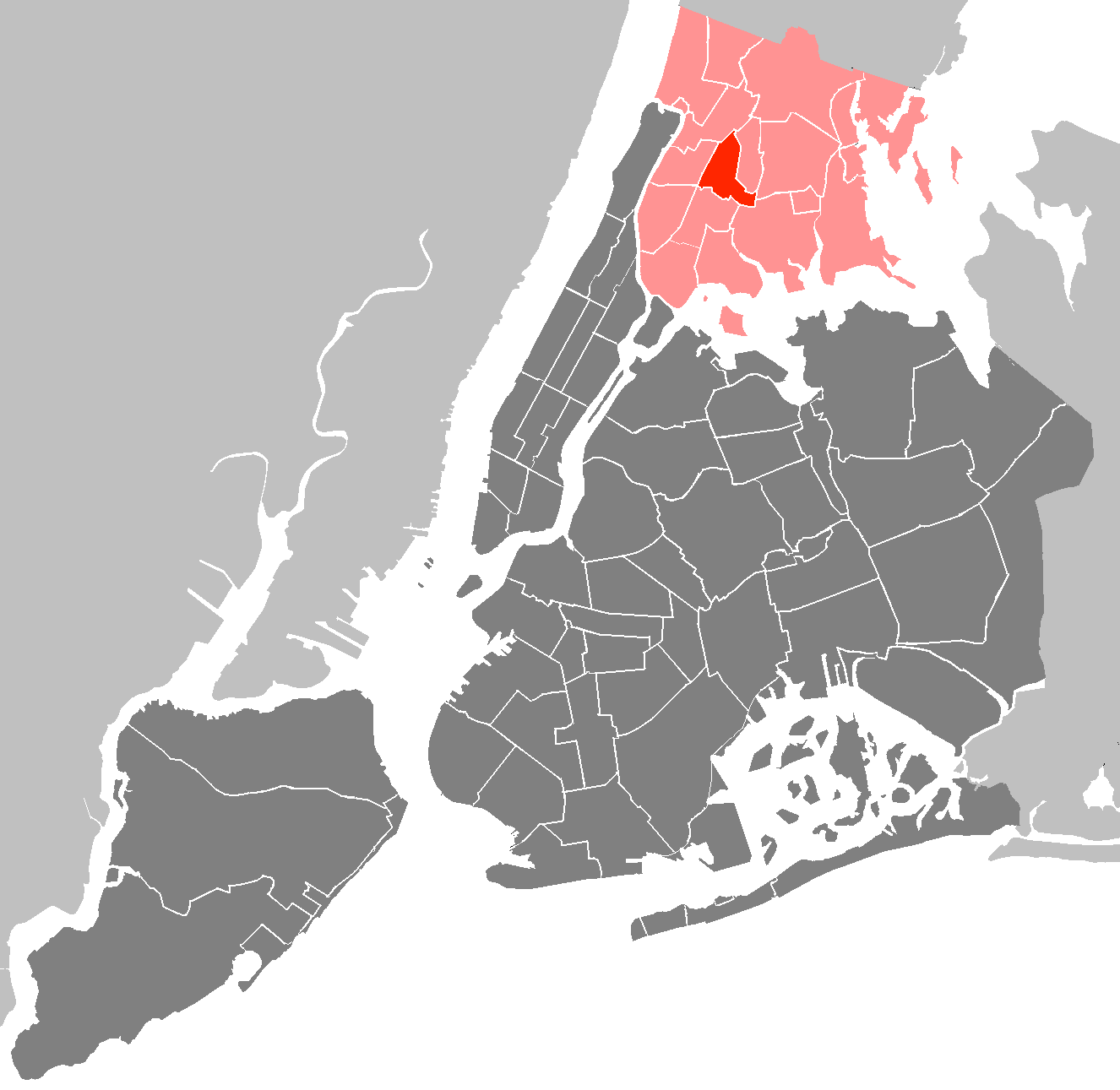
- Location in The Bronx
- Country: United States
- State: New York
- City: New York City
- Borough: The Bronx
- Neighborhoods: list: Bathgate; Belmont; East Tremont; West Farms

Government
  - Type: Community board
  - Body: Bronx Community Board 6
  - Chairperson: Evonne Capers
  - District Manager: Thomas Alexander

Area
  - Total: 1.5 sq mi (3.9 km^{2})

Population (2000)
  - Total: 75,688
  - Density: 50,000/sq mi (19,000/km^{2})

Ethnicity
  - Hispanic and Latino Americans: 61.3%
  - African-American: 26%
  - White: 9.3%
  - Asian: 1.2%
  - Others: 0.3%
  - American Indian or Alaska Native: 0.3%
- Time zone: UTC−5 (Eastern)
  - Summer (DST): UTC−4 (EDT)
- ZIP codes: 10457, 10458, and 10460
- Area codes: 718, 347, and 929, and 917
- Police Precincts: 48th (website)
- Website: cbbronx.cityofnewyork.us/cb6/

Bronx Community Board 6 is a local government unit of the city of New York, encompassing the neighborhoods of Bathgate, Belmont, East Tremont, and West Farms as Bronx Community District 6. It is delimited by Bronx Park to the east and north, Webster Avenue to the west, and Crotona Park North and the Cross Bronx Expressway to the south.

== Community board staff and membership ==
The current chairperson of the Bronx Community board 6 is Evonne Capers. Its District Manager is Rafael Moure-Punnett.

The City Council members representing the community district are non-voting, ex officio board members. The council members and their council districts are:

- 15th NYC Council District - Oswald Feliz
- 17th NYC Council District - Rafael Salamanca

== Bylaws ==
Bronx Community Board 6 has bylaws which allow members absent from three consecutive meetings or more than half the meetings in a year to be removed.

== Demographics ==
As of the United States 2000 Census, the Community District has a population of 75,688, up from 68,061 in 1990 and 65,014 in 1980. Of them, 46,391 (61.3%) are of Hispanic origin, 19,694 (26%) are Black, non-Hispanic, 7,021 (9.3%) are White, non-Hispanic, 891 (1.2%) are Asian or Pacific Islander, 201 (0.3%) American Indian or Alaska Native, 238 (0.3%) are some other race (non-Hispanic), and 1,252 (1.7%) of two or more races (non-Hispanic).
