= Throggs Neck =

Neighborhood in New York City

- Neighborhood of the Bronx
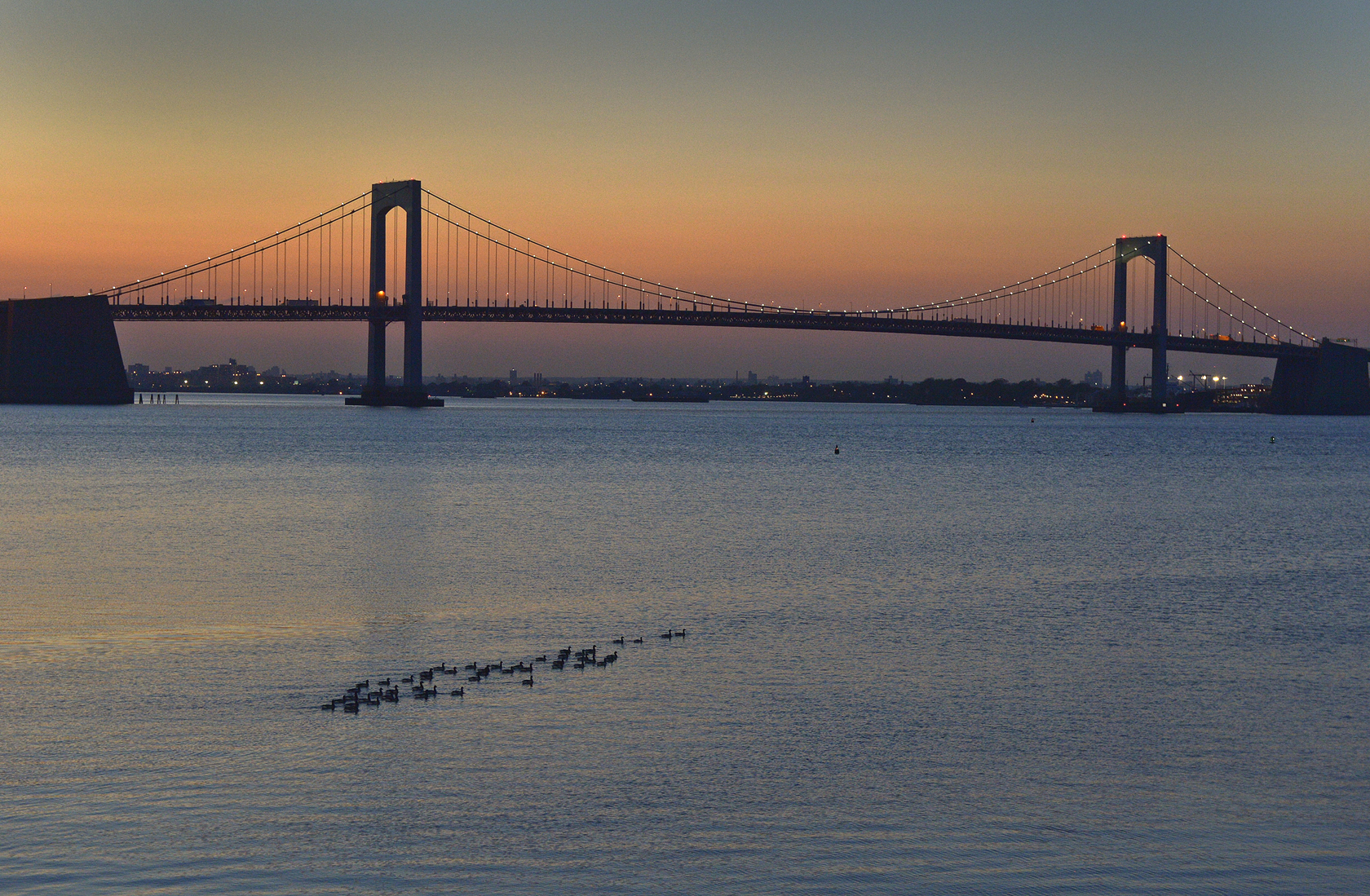
- Throgs Neck Bridge
- Location in New York City
- Coordinates: 40.823°N 73.82°W
- Country: United States
- State: New York
- City: New York City
- Borough: The Bronx
- Community District: Bronx 10

Area
  - Total: 1.903 sq mi (4.93 km^{2})

Population (2011)
  - Total: 21,009
  - Density: 11,040/sq mi (4,263/km^{2})

Economics
  - Median income: $69,003
- ZIP Codes: 10465
- Area code: 718, 347, 929, and 917

Throggs Neck (also known as Throgs Neck) is a neighborhood and peninsula in the south-eastern portion of the borough of the Bronx in New York City. It is bounded by the East River and Long Island Sound to the south and east, Westchester Creek on the west, and Baisley Avenue and the Bruckner Expressway on the north.

The neighborhood is part of Bronx Community District 10, and its ZIP Code is 10465. Throggs Neck is patrolled by the 45th Precinct of the New York City Police Department.

== Geography ==
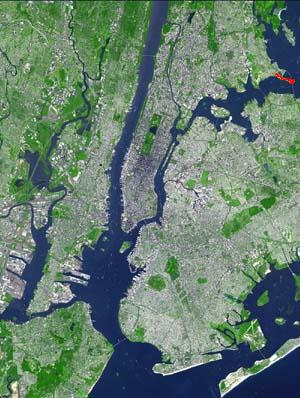
The geographic feature Throggs Neck, shown in red, in the Bronx

Throggs Neck is a narrow spit of land in the south-eastern portion of the borough of the Bronx in New York City. It demarcates the passage between the East River (an estuary) and Long Island Sound. "Throggs Neck" is also the name of the neighborhood of the peninsula, bounded on the north by Baisley Avenue and the Bruckner Expressway, on the west by Westchester Creek, and on the other sides by the River and the Sound.

The neighborhood is at the northern approach to the Throgs Neck Bridge, which connects the Bronx with the neighborhood of Bay Terrace in the borough of Queens on Long Island. The Throgs Neck Lighthouse formerly stood at its southern tip. The northern approach to the Bronx–Whitestone Bridge is also within the Throggs Neck area. The large Ferry Point Park is divided by the Bronx/Whitestone Bridge into a 110 acres (45 ha) west side made of soccer and cricket fields, NY Ferry stop‚ and a 420-acre (170 ha) east side featuring a promenade, golf course and waterfront restaurant.

== Name ==
Originating from the surname "Throckmorton", the spelling of the area has been historically variable, with a mix of spellings with one "G" or two, with the traditional spelling being with two Gs. There is an urban legend that during development of the bridge that would bear the neighborhood's name, NYC Parks Commissioner and Triborough Bridge and Tunnel Authority Chairman Robert Moses officially shortened it to one G after deciding that two would not fit on many of the street signs, though many long-time residents continue to use the traditional spelling.

== History ==
=== Early history ===
The peninsula was called Vriedelandt, "Land of Peace", by the New Netherlanders. The current name comes from John Throckmorton, English immigrant and associate of Roger Williams in Massachusetts and Rhode Island. The Dutch allowed Throckmorton to settle in this peripheral area of New Amsterdam in 1642, with thirty-five others. At this time, the peninsula was also known as Maxson's point as the Maxson family (Richard, Rebecca, John, etc.) lived there. Many of the settlers, including Anne Hutchinson and her family, were murdered in a 1643 uprising of Native Americans. Throckmorton returned to Rhode Island. In 1668, the peninsula appeared on maps as "Frockes Neck". The peninsula was virtually an island at high tide.

In 1776, George Washington's headquarters wrote of a potential British landing at "Frogs Neck". At the bridge over Westchester Creek, now represented by an unobtrusive steel and concrete span at East Tremont Avenue near Westchester Avenue, General Howe did make an unsuccessful effort to cut off Washington's troops in October 1776; when the British approached, the Americans ripped up the plank bridge and opened a heavy fire that forced Howe to withdraw and change his plans. The engagement became known as the Battle of Throgs Neck (or Throg's Point). Six days later Howe landed troops at Rodman's Neck to the north, on the far side of Eastchester Bay. A farm in the area owned by the Stephenson family was sold in 1795 to Abijah Hammond, who built a large mansion (later the offices of the Silver Beach Garden Corporation).

In the 19th century, the area remained the site of large farms, converted into estates. In about 1848, members of the Morris family purchased a large parcel of land there. They built two mansions and many cottages and service buildings. The Morris estates had a private dock in Morris Cove, at the end of what is now Emerson Avenue, where they had nearly a mile of shoreline. After the Civil War, Collis P. Huntington, the railroad builder, owned an extensive parcel, which his heirs held until they were almost the last estate on Throggs Neck. Huntington's property was previously owned by Frederick C. Havemeyer Jr., a sugar magnate, and the Havemeyer-Huntington mansion is now home to Preston High School, New York.

=== 20th century ===
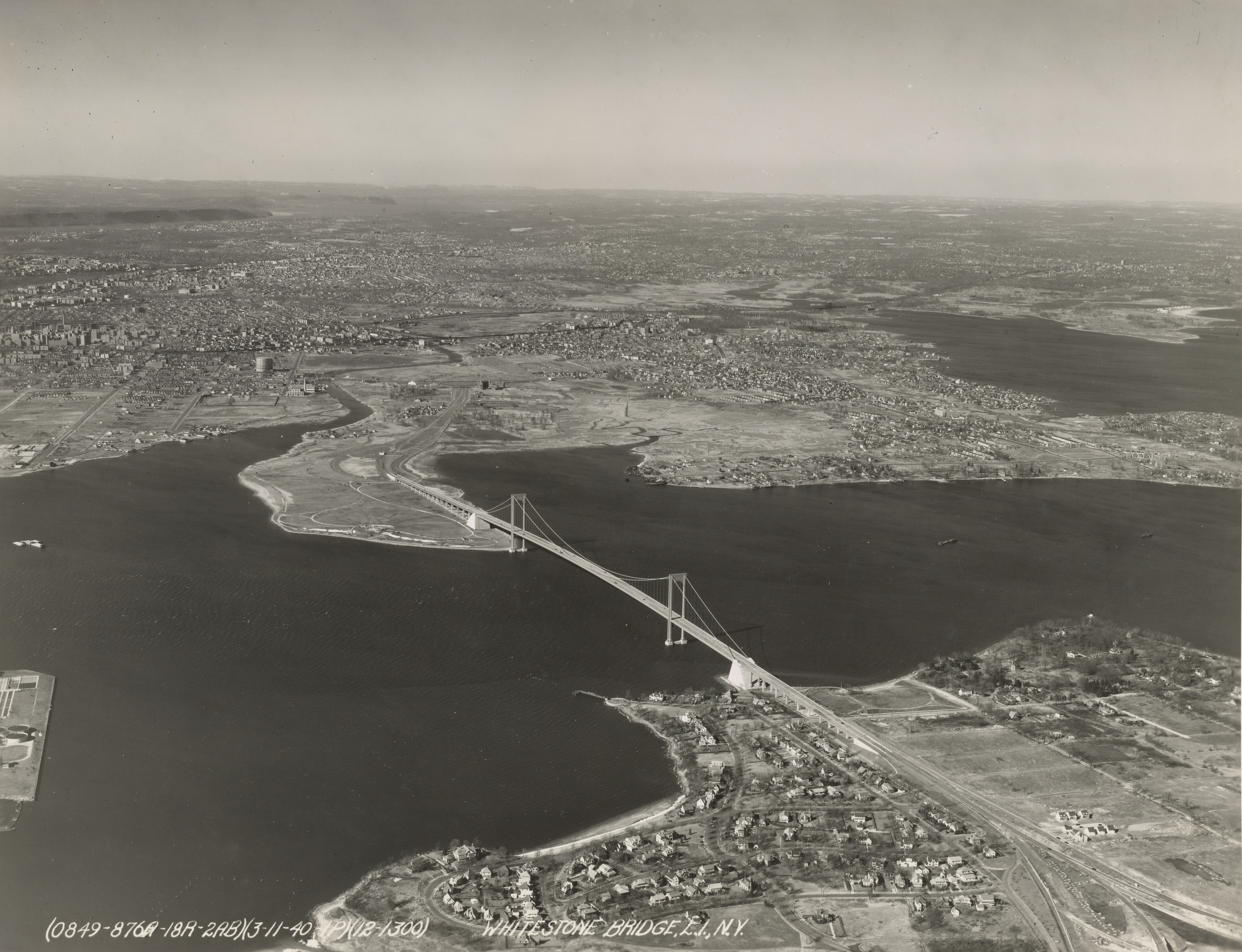
The Throggs Neck neighborhood behind the newly constructed Bronx–Whitestone Bridge in 1940

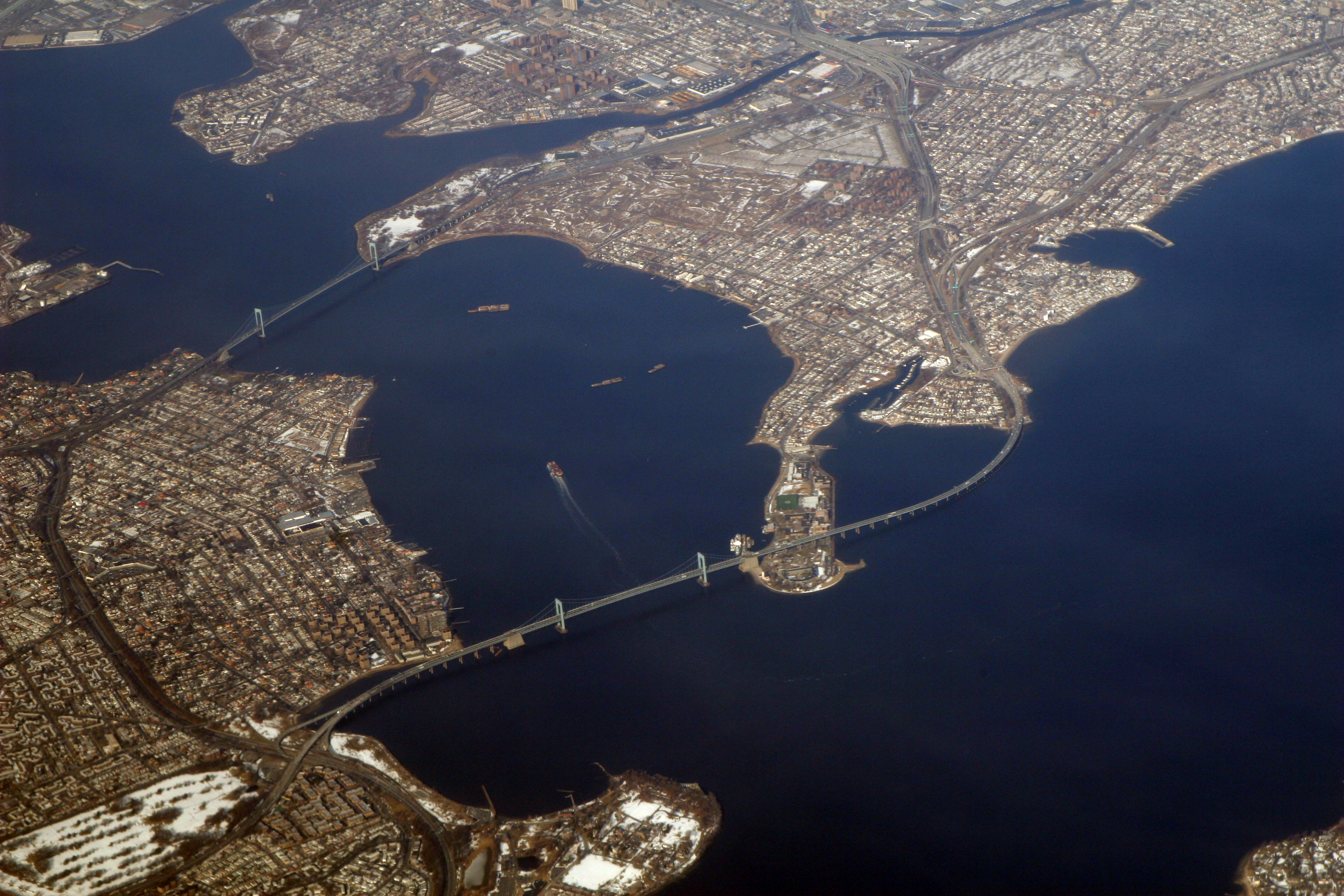
The neighborhood in 2010

Throgs Neck Park, a 0.44-acre (0.18 ha) public park that faces Throggs Neck from the opposite shore at the end of Myers Street, was acquired as a public place in 1836. From 1833 to 1856, the construction of Fort Schuyler brought in laborers and craftsmen, many of whom were immigrants from Ireland, to settle in the area with their families. By the late 19th century, the area had developed into a fashionable but more public summer resort, which also contained large German beer gardens, to which the residents of Yorkville arrived by steamboat service up the East River. The 19th-century steamboat landing at Ferris Dock on Westchester Creek stood at present-day Brush Avenue north of Wenner Place; the road to it bore the name of the steamboat Osseo. The Ferris family were 18th-century residents, whose Ferris Point at the south-east corner of the Throggs Neck neighborhood now supports the Hutchinson River Parkway (formerly Ferris Lane) overhead ramp to the Bronx-Whitestone Bridge and Ferry Point Park.

In the decades after the 1898 incorporation of the Bronx into the City of Greater New York, transit lines were extended to the neighborhood, bringing in many Italian farmers and tradesmen. In the 1920s the large estates largely became converted into smaller row homes and densely built bungalow lots. The Peters and Sorgenfrel families formed Silver Beach Garden (named for the color of the beach at low tide), a summer colony of bungalows that were later adapted for year-round use; most of the streets were named for flowers and trees found on the Hammond estate. Residents owned their houses but rented the land when they joined to buy it. Nearby to the north, a campsite for church youth transformed into a bungalow colony later named Edgewater Park.

In 1932, Fort Schuyler closed as an active military installation and became the campus for cadets of the State University of New York Maritime College. A 1929–39 pair of plans to expand the subway system with a Second Avenue Subway branch to Throggs Neck did not come to pass. By 1961, with the construction of the Throggs Neck Bridge, as well as the adjacent parkways, the neighborhood lost its comparative isolation. However, Throggs Neck was largely exempt from the severe urban decay that affected much of the Bronx in the 1970s.

The last two of several large and handsome 18th-century Ferris houses in the neighborhood lasted until the 1960s, when the James Ferris house overlooking Eastchester Bay was hastily demolished in 1962 and the Watson Ferris house was demolished in 1964 by its occupants, the Tremont Terrace Moravian Church. The James Ferris house had been commandeered by Admiral Richard Howe as his headquarters in October 1776, when James Ferris was sent to the prison hulks in New York harbor, where he died in 1780.

== Demographics ==
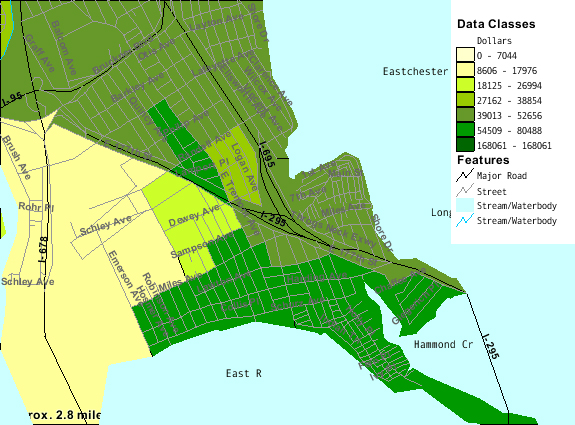
Map of the income distribution in Throggs Neck

The neighborhood has several beach clubs and a diverse housing stock, including middle-class homes, up-market waterfront condominiums, as well as the Throggs Neck Houses, built in 1953 as one of the first low-income public housing projects in New York City and later expanded twice. In 1984, the New York Times described Throggs Neck as one of the last middle- and upper-middle-class areas in the Bronx, noting the area "seems like a well-kept suburb". Even in the mid-1980s, after the city failed to pave neighborhood streets properly, waterfront condominiums were selling for as much as $416,468 in 2005 dollars. As of the 2000 Census, the median household income for census tracts within the neighborhood ranged from $18,000 to $85,000 in the less affluent tracts and well over $100,000 for the waterfront tracts near the Throgs Neck Bridge.

Based on data from the 2010 United States census, the population of Schuylerville, Throgs Neck, and Edgewater Park was 44,167, a change of 455 (1%) from the 43,712 counted in 2000. Covering an area of 2,068.82 acres (837.22 ha), the neighborhood had a population density of 21.3 inhabitants per acre (13,600/sq mi; 5,300/km^{2}). The racial makeup of the neighborhood was 46.1% (20,348) White, 7.9% (3,479) African American, 0.2% (93) Native American, 3.2% (1,430) Asian, 0% (15) Pacific Islander, 0.5% (238) from other races, and 1% (450) from two or more races. Hispanics or Latinos of any race were 41% (18,114) of the population.

The entirety of Community District 10, which comprises City Island, Co-op City, Country Club, Pelham Bay, Schuylerville, Throgs Neck and Westchester Square, had 121,868 inhabitants as of NYC Health's 2018 Community Health Profile, with an average life expectancy of 81.1 years. This is about the same as the median life expectancy of 81.2 for all New York City neighborhoods. Most inhabitants are youth and middle-aged adults: 20% are between the ages of between 0–17, 26% between 25 and 44, and 27% between 45 and 64. The ratio of college-aged and elderly residents was lower, at 9% and 18% respectively.

As of 2017, the median household income in Community District 10 was $59,522. In 2018, an estimated 14% of Community District 10 residents lived in poverty, compared to 25% in all of the Bronx and 20% in all of New York City. One in eleven residents (9%) were unemployed, compared to 13% in the Bronx and 9% in New York City. Rent burden, or the percentage of residents who have difficulty paying their rent, is 45% in Community District 10, compared to the boroughwide and citywide rates of 58% and 51% respectively. Based on this calculation, as of 2018, Community District 10 is considered high-income relative to the rest of the city and not gentrifying.

== Police and crime ==
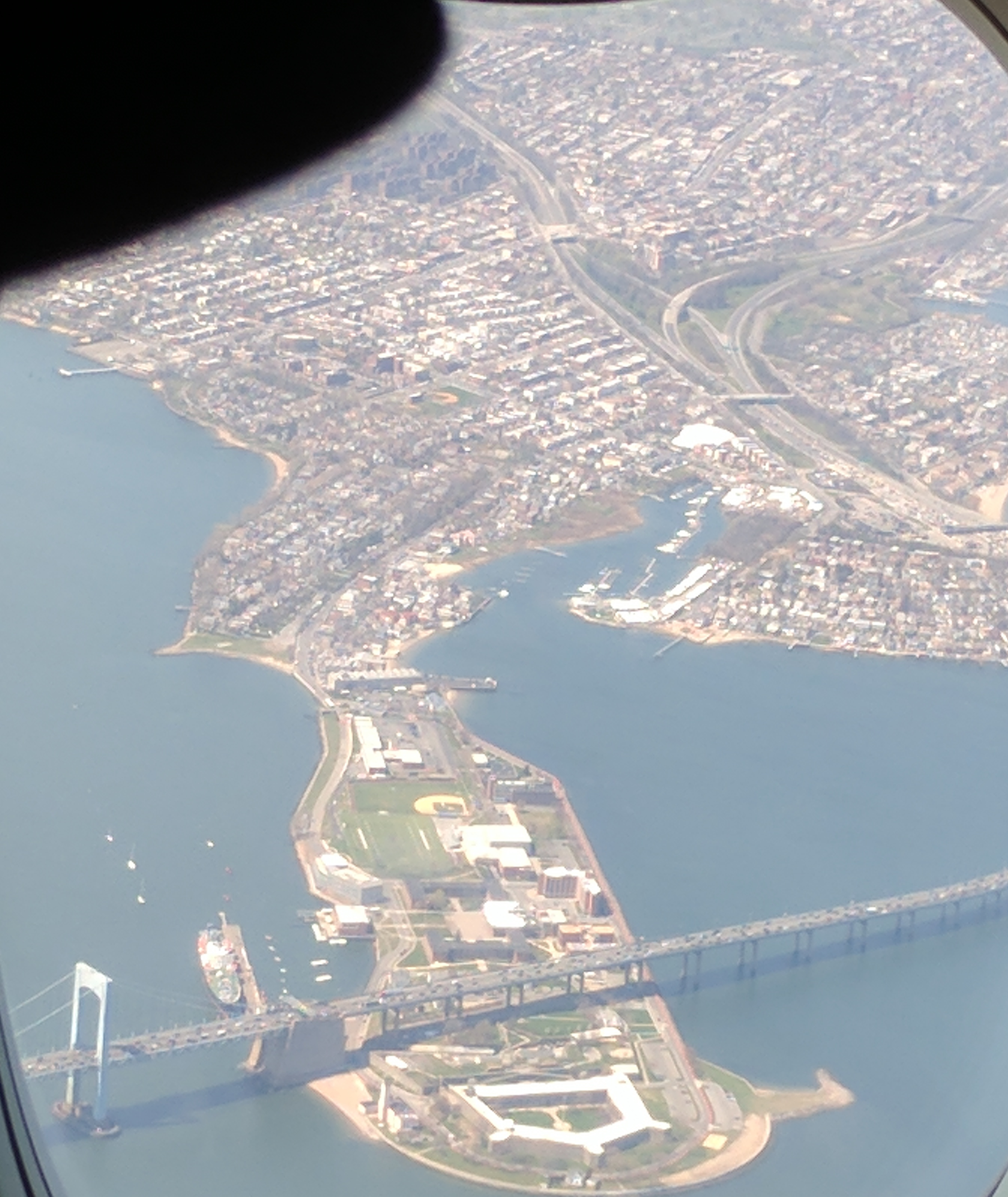
Aerial view of Throggs Neck peninsula

Community District 10 is patrolled by the 45th Precinct of the NYPD, located at 2877 Barkley Avenue in Throggs Neck. The 45th Precinct ranked 28th safest out of 69 patrol areas for per-capita crime in 2010. As of 2018, with a non-fatal assault rate of 53 per 100,000 people, Community District 10's rate of violent crimes per capita is less than that of the city as a whole. The incarceration rate of 243 per 100,000 people is lower than that of the city as a whole.

The 45th Precinct has a lower crime rate than in the 1990s, with crimes across all categories having decreased by 67% between 1990 and 2022. The precinct reported five murders, 13 rapes, 235 robberies, 265 felony assaults, 108 burglaries, 609 grand larcenies, and 323 grand larcenies auto in 2022.

== Fire safety ==
Throggs Neck is served by two fire stations of the New York City Fire Department (FDNY). Engine Co. 89/Ladder Co. 50 is located at 2924 Bruckner Boulevard, while Engine Co. 72/Satellite 2 is located at 3929 East Tremont Avenue.

== Health ==
As of 2018, preterm births are more common in Community District 10 than in other places citywide, though births to teenage mothers are less common. In Community District 10, there were 110 preterm births per 1,000 live births (compared to 87 per 1,000 citywide), and 10.3 births to teenage mothers per 1,000 live births (compared to 19.3 per 1,000 citywide). Community District 10 has a low population of residents who are uninsured. In 2018, this population of uninsured residents was estimated to be 7%, lower than the citywide rate of 14%, though this was based on a small sample size.

The concentration of fine particulate matter, the deadliest type of air pollutant, in Community District 10 is 0.0075 milligrams per cubic meter (7.5×10^{−9} oz/ft^{3}), the same as the city average. Fourteen percent of Community District 10 residents are smokers, which is the same as the city average of 14% of residents being smokers. In Community District 10, 24% of residents are obese, 13% are diabetic, and 37% have high blood pressure—compared to the citywide averages of 24%, 11%, and 28% respectively. In addition, 25% of children are obese, compared to the citywide average of 20%.

Eighty-seven percent of residents eat some fruits and vegetables every day, which is the same as the city's average of 87%. In 2018, 77% of residents described their health as "good", "very good", or "excellent", about the same as the city's average of 78%. For every supermarket in Community District 10, there are 7 bodegas.

The nearest large hospitals are Calvary Hospital, Montefiore Medical Center's Jack D. Weiler Hospital, and NYC Health + Hospitals/Jacobi in Morris Park. The Albert Einstein College of Medicine campus is also located in Morris Park.

== Post office and ZIP Code ==
Throgs Neck is located within ZIP Code 10465. The United States Postal Service's Throggs Neck Station is located at 3630 East Tremont Avenue.

== Education ==
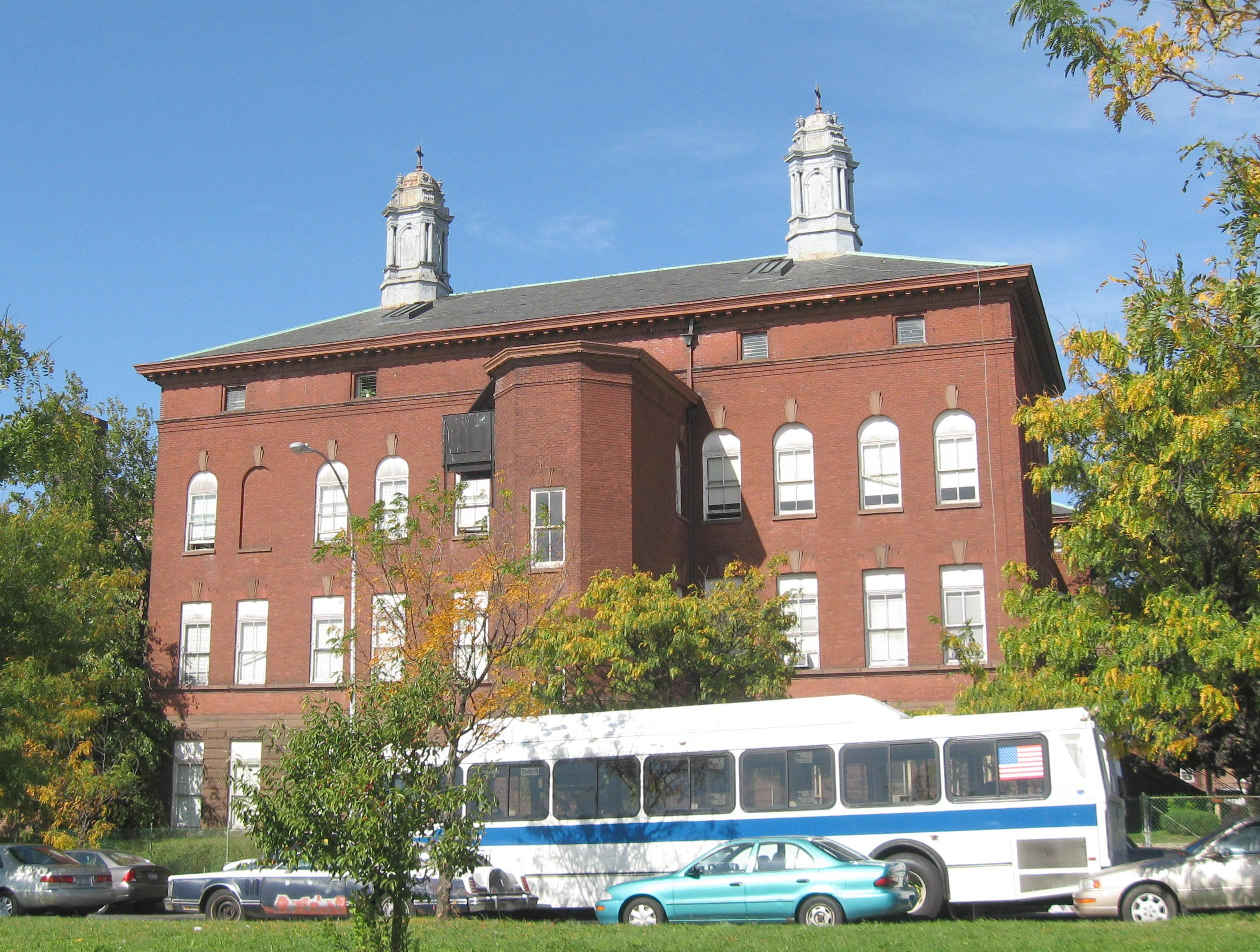
Looking northwest at Monsignor Scanlan High School, 2008

Community District 10 generally has a lower rate of college-educated residents than the rest of the city as of 2018. While 34% of residents age 25 and older have a college education or higher, 16% have less than a high school education and 50% are high school graduates or have some college education. By contrast, 26% of Bronx residents and 43% of city residents have a college education or higher. The percentage of Community District 10 students excelling in math rose from 29% in 2000 to 47% in 2011, and reading achievement increased from 33% to 35% during the same time period.

Community District 10's rate of elementary school student absenteeism is slightly higher than the rest of New York City. In Community District 10, 21% of elementary school students missed twenty or more days per school year, a little more than the citywide average of 20%. Additionally, 75% of high school students in Community District 10 graduate on time, the same as the citywide average of 75%.

=== Schools ===
The New York City Department of Education operates the following public schools in Throggs Neck:

- PS 10 (grades PK-8)
- PS 72 Dr William Dorney (grades PK-5)
- MS 101 Edward R Byrne (grades 6–8)
- PS 304 Early Childhood School (grades PK-5)
- Hospital Schools (grades K-12)
- Mott Hall Community School (grades 6–8)

The following private schools are located in Throggs Neck:

- St Frances De Chantal School (grades PK-8)
- Preston High School (grades 9–12)
- Monsignor Scanlan High School (grades 9–12)
- St Benedict School (grades PK-8)

=== Library ===
The New York Public Library (NYPL)'s Throg's Neck branch is located at 3025 Cross Bronx Expressway Extension. The branch has operated since 1954 and moved to its current one-story building in 1974.

== Transportation ==
The following MTA Regional Bus Operations bus routes serve Throggs Neck:

- Bx5: to Pelham Bay Park and Bay Plaza Shopping Center or Simpson Street station (2 and 5 trains) (via Bruckner Blvd and Story Ave)
- Bx8: to 225th St station or Locust Point (via Williamsbridge Rd)
- Bx40/Bx42: to Throggs Neck or Morris Heights (via East Tremont Avenue)
- Q44 SBS: to Jamaica, Queens or Bronx Zoo (via Cross Bronx Expressway Service Road)
- Q50: to Flushing, Queens or Co-op City (via Bruckner Blvd)
- BxM9: express to Midtown Manhattan

Throgs Neck Landing was opened as part of NYC Ferry's Soundview route on December, 28th 2021.

The Throgs Neck Bridge and the Whitestone Bridge provide access to Queens and Long Island. Due to the proximity of the Bruckner Interchange, the crossroads of the Hutchinson River Parkway, the Bruckner Expressway, the Hutchinson River Expressway, the Cross-Bronx Expressway, and also the Throgs Neck Expressway and the New England Thruway, there is convenient highway access to Throggs Neck from many parts of the New York area.

Numerous roadways near the southern end of Throggs Neck are named in honor of Union generals from the American Civil War, including Philip Kearny, John Reynolds, Carl Schurz, Thomas Meagher, and Benjamin Prentiss. Another roadway is named for James Longstreet, a Confederate general who, once the war had ended, embraced Reconstruction and consequently became the object of intense Southern opprobrium.

== In popular culture ==
Several television shows and movies have been filmed in Throggs Neck, including these films:

- Awakenings (1990)
- Summer of Sam (1999)

Television shows include:

- Episodes of Law & Order: Special Victims Unit
- Storage Wars: New York
- Scenes in The Leftovers

== Notable people ==
- Frank Bello (born 1965), bass player for the heavy metal band Anthrax
- Charlie Benante (born 1962), drummer for the heavy metal band Anthrax
- Simon M. Ehrlich (1852–1895), lawyer and judge
- Collis Potter Huntington (1821–1900), railroad magnate
- Christine Jorgensen (1926–1989), first transgender celebrity, 1950s-60s, following surgical transformation in Denmark, 1952; born and raised on Dudley Avenue
- Michael Kay (born 1961), sports broadcaster
- Doug Marrone (born 1964), head coach of the Jacksonville Jaguars
- Sal Mineo (1939–76), Actor, Academy Award Nominee
- Bill Polian (born 1942), Hall of Fame executive in the National Football League.
- T.J. Rivera (born 1988), infielder who played in Major League Baseball for the New York Mets.
- Ritchie Torres (born 1988), Congressman of New York's 15th congressional district.
