= Castle Hill, Bronx =

Neighborhood in New York City

Castle Hill
- Neighborhood of the Bronx
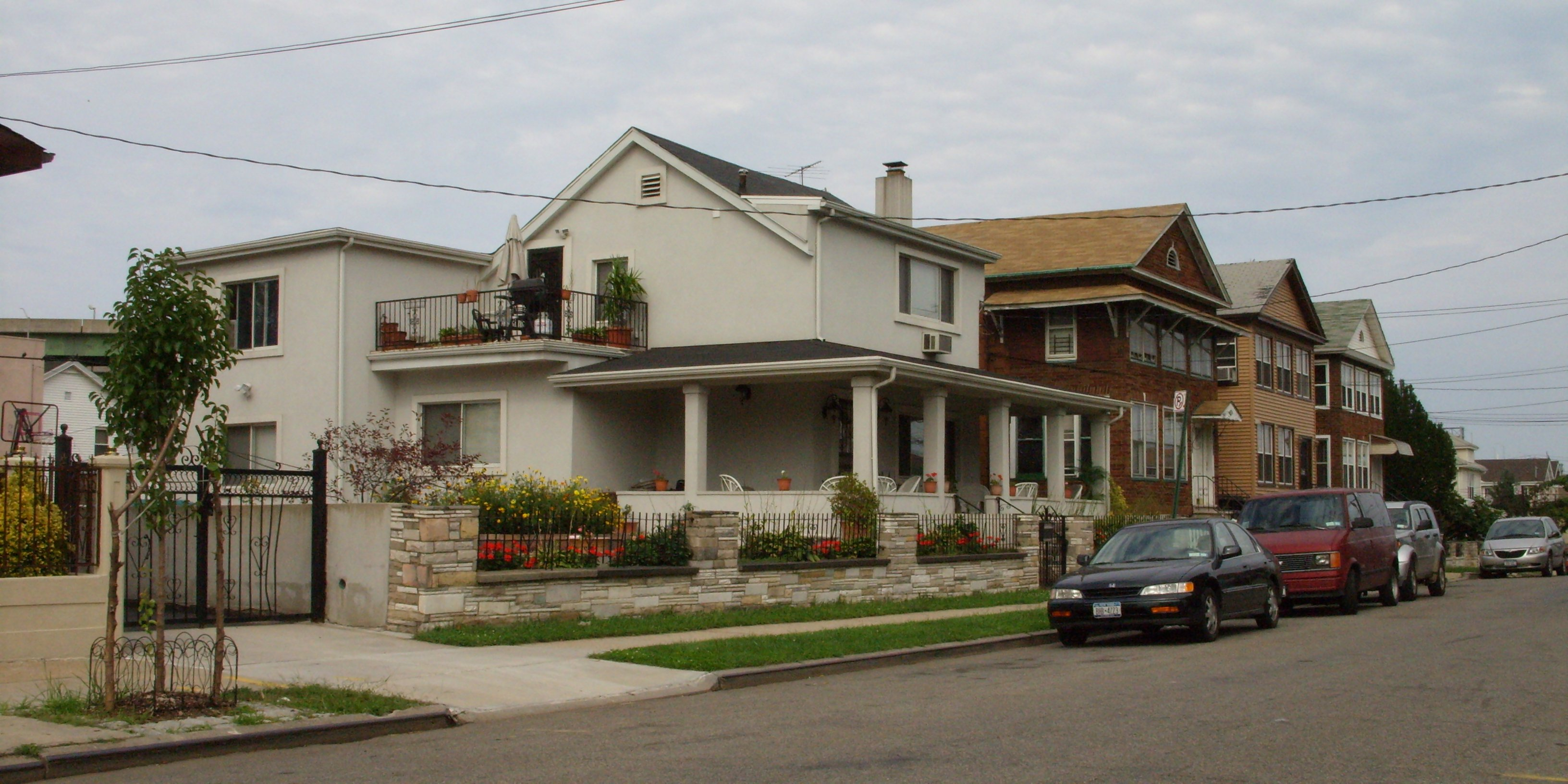
- Quimby Avenue east of Castle Hill Avenue (2007)
- Interactive map of Castle Hill
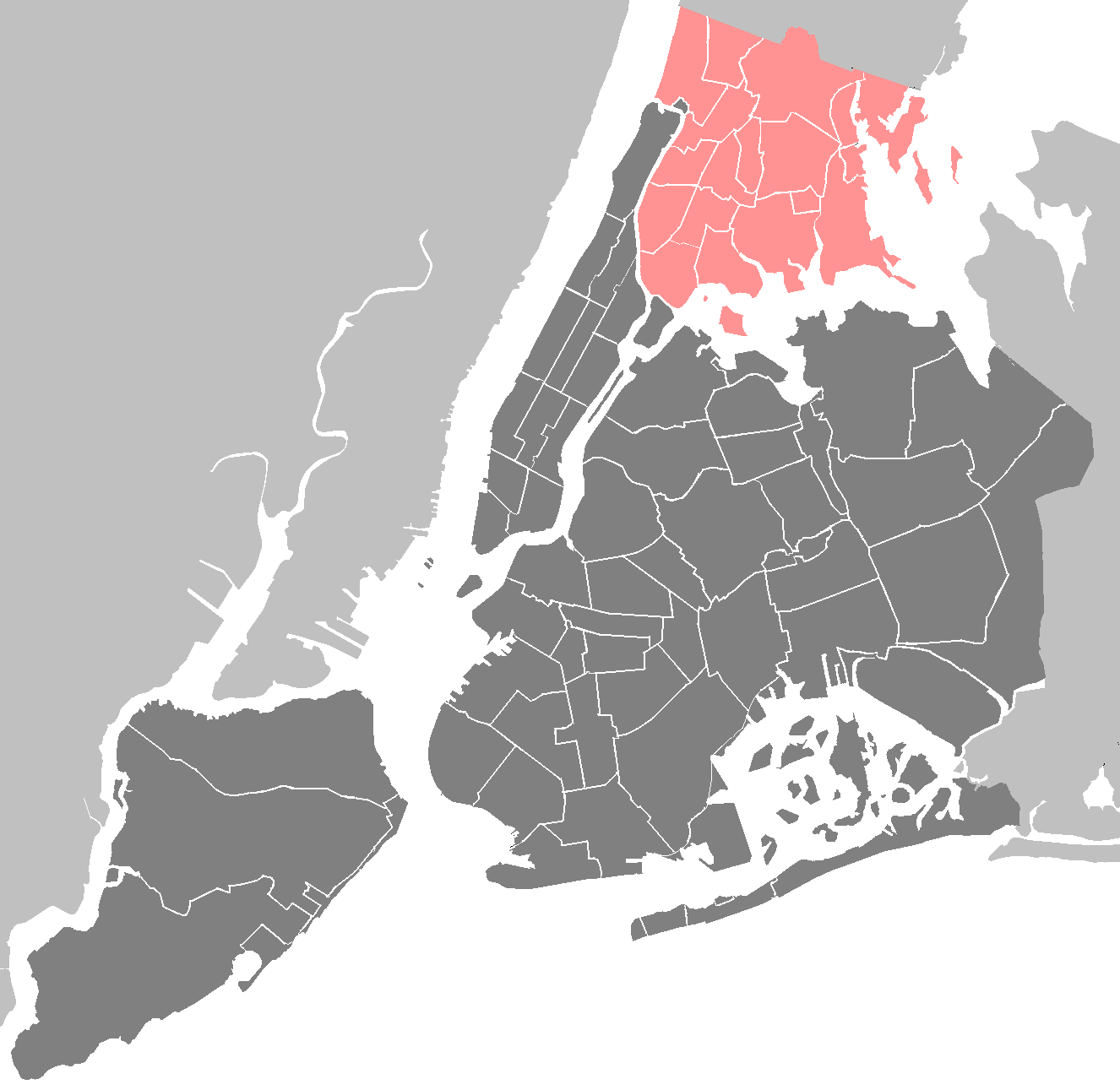
- Location within Bronx Location within New York Location within the United States
- Coordinates: 40.819°N 73.85°W
- Country: United States
- State: New York
- City: New York City
- Borough: Bronx
- Community District: Bronx 9

Area
  - Total: 1.3 sq mi (3.4 km^{2})

Population (2010)
  - Total: 38,557
  - Density: 30,000/sq mi (11,000/km^{2})

Economics
  - Median income: $42,171
- ZIP Codes: 10462, 10472, 10473
- Area code: 718, 347, 929, and 917
- Website: www.castlehill.nyc

Castle Hill is a neighborhood located in the southeast section of the borough of the Bronx in New York City. Its boundaries are Waterbury Avenue and Westchester Avenue to the north, Westchester Creek to the east, the East River to the south, and White Plains Road to the west. Unionport is a subsection of Castle Hill, typically considered north of Lafayette Avenue.

The neighborhood is part of Bronx Community Board 9. ZIP Codes include 10462, 10472, and 10473. The area is patrolled by the NYPD's 43rd Precinct. New York City Housing Authority (NYCHA) property in the area is patrolled by P.S.A. 8 at 2794 Randall Avenue.

== History ==
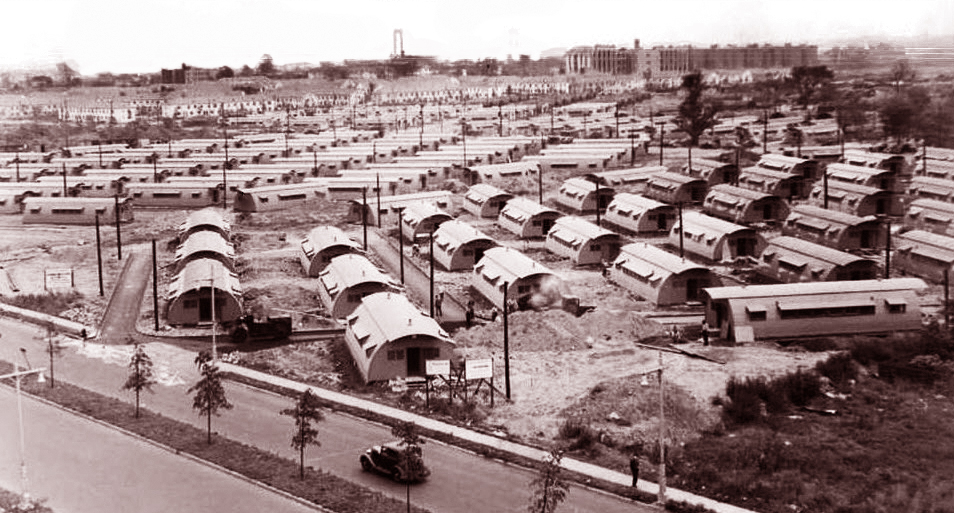
Bronx Quonset Huts (c. 1947)

Most development initially concentrated near the IRT Pelham Line on Westchester Avenue and in close proximity to Castle Hill Avenue (once served by a streetcar). The predominant housing was a mixture of attached and detached two- and three-story buildings with one or multiple units, closely set on small lots. Later, larger four- to six-story buildings were constructed in addition on some remaining parcels as the demand for housing in the area increased. Castle Hill became home to many European immigrants looking to leave Lower Manhattan's overpopulated immigrant communities. By the mid-20th century, large land parcels primarily south of Bruckner Boulevard remained undeveloped. Vacant land was used to provide temporary housing, using Quonset hut structures, to returning World War II veterans. During the 1950s the Bruckner Expressway was constructed, bisecting the area. The NYCHA built the Castle Hill Houses in 1959, adding over 2,000 housing units to the community. Later during the 1960s and 1970s, large apartment complexes were constructed in the neighborhood following the establishment of the Mitchell Lama program. In 2000, the largest remaining collection of vacant parcels was developed near Castle Hill Point with modern two-story, two-unit attached rowhouses.

Like neighboring Soundview, Castle Hill began to fall into rapid decay in the 1970s due to white flight, growing poverty rates, and a citywide fiscal crisis. Much of the white non-Hispanic population was replaced by poor and working-class Latin Americans and African Americans. As a result, abandonment was much less extensive than in neighborhoods to the west, including Morrisania. The neighborhood was gravely affected by the crack epidemic throughout the late 1980s and early 1990s. Improved policing methods include NYPD-monitored CCTV along known high drug-trafficking areas, increased foot presence, and improved statistical mapping.

In more recent years, a citywide housing crisis spurred construction of modern multi-unit row houses and apartment buildings. Many are multi zoned for retail and have mixed-income qualifications. There are also plans to develop this type of housing on vacant land within the confines of NYCHA Castle Hill Houses along with significant renovations and improvements to existing grounds and buildings. The neighborhood has become increasingly more diverse with a rise in varied Latin American and Asian immigration in recent years. Crime has also seen a significant decline versus historic highs as a result of a number of factors including enhanced policing techniques and changing economic demographics.

== Demographics ==
The neighborhood predominantly consists of Latin Americans (a plurality having Puerto Rican and Dominican ancestry) and African Americans. 73% of residential units are renter-occupied. There is significant income diversity but the poverty rate is higher and median household income lower than the New York City average.

The entirety of Community District 9, which comprises Castle Hill, Clason Point, and Parkchester, had 184,105 inhabitants as of NYC Health's 2018 Community Health Profile, with an average life expectancy of 79.7 years. This is about the same as the median life expectancy of 81.2 for all New York City neighborhoods. Most inhabitants are youth and middle-aged adults: 25% are between the ages of between 0–17, 29% between 25–44, and 24% between 45–64. The ratio of college-aged and elderly residents was lower, at 10% and 12% respectively.

As of 2017, the median household income in Community District 9 was $40,005. In 2018, an estimated 26% of Castle Hill and Parkchester residents lived in poverty, compared to 25% in all of the Bronx and 20% in all of New York City. One in eight residents (13%) were unemployed, compared to 13% in the Bronx and 9% in New York City. Rent burden, or the percentage of residents who have difficulty paying their rent, is 55% in Castle Hill and Parkchester, compared to the boroughwide and citywide rates of 58% and 51% respectively. Based on this calculation, as of 2018, Castle Hill and Parkchester are considered low-income relative to the rest of the city and not gentrifying.

== Land use and terrain ==
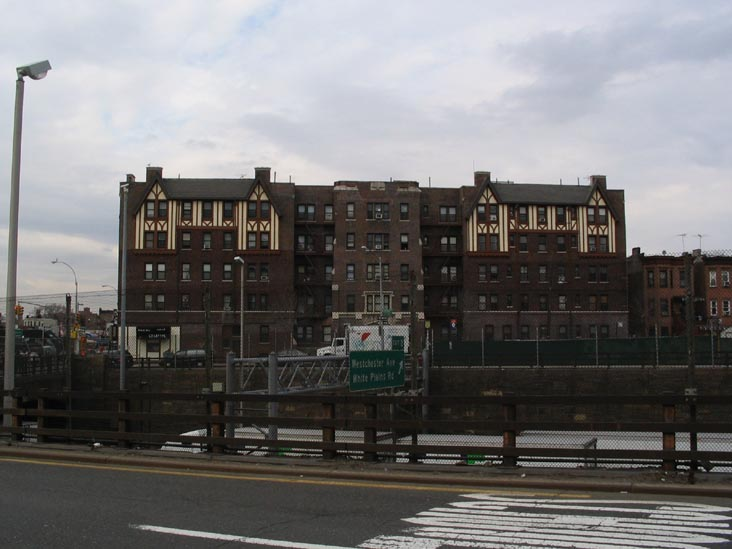
Large apartment buildings at the corner of Castle Hill Avenue and Haviland Avenue (2006)

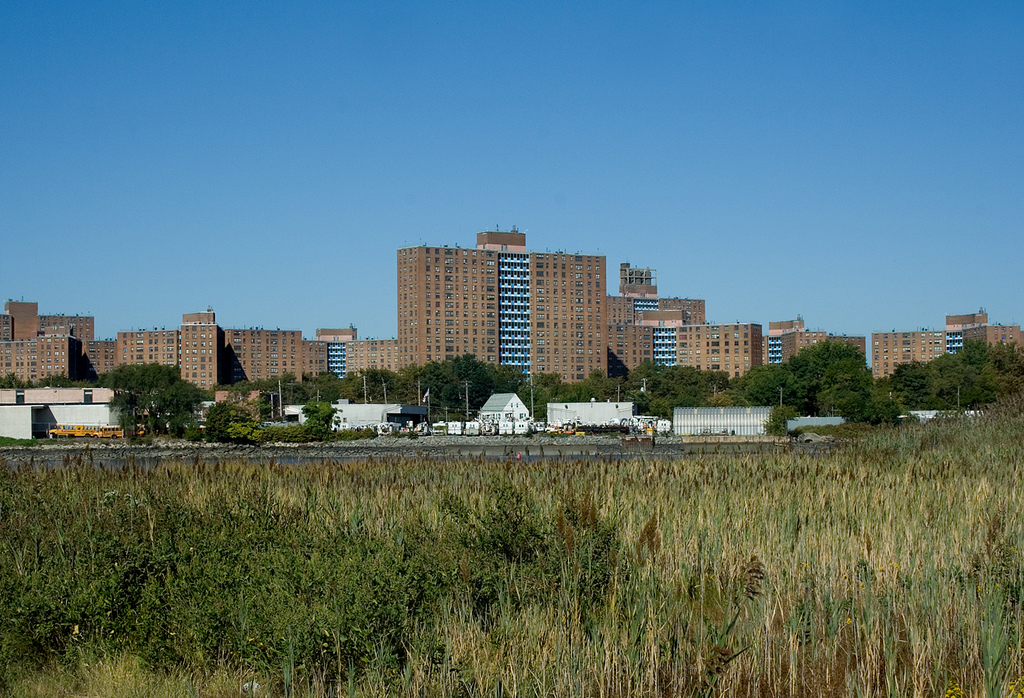
The Castle Hill public housing complex in the background of a grass field.

The land area contains a mix of uses but is primarily residential. There is a mixture of pre-war architecture, mid-century, and modern construction. Multi-unit attached and detached houses dominate much of the land area.

The Castle Hill Houses take up significant land area in the southern part of the community along with the Mitchell-Lama Jamie Towers housing complex. The Castle Hill Houses is an low income public housing complex, operated by the New York City Housing Authority (NYCHA). Constructed in 1953, it consists of 27 buildings on a 33-acre (13 ha) site.

The neighborhood's primary commercial corridors are White Plains Road, Castle Hill Avenue, and Westchester Avenue.

The Castle Hill Avenue Business Improvement District was started with the assistance of Councilwoman Annabel Palma and James Vacca in June 2012.

=== Shops at Bruckner Commons ===
The Shops at Bruckner Commons, which greatly expanded throughout the 1990s and mostly renovated in 2018, divides Castle Hill from neighboring Soundview and contains some national chain stores. Other primary thoroughfares contain amenities like supermarkets, pharmacies, barbershops, hair salons, fast food, bodegas, and cheap shops.

The eastern border of the neighborhood, adjacent to the Westchester Creek, is primarily used for storage, warehousing, and municipal uses.

The area gradually comes to peak elevation along Castle Hill Avenue.

== Police and crime ==
Castle Hill and other parts of Community District 9 are patrolled by the 43rd Precinct of the NYPD, located at 900 Fteley Avenue. In 2010, the 43rd Precinct ranked 36th-safest out of 69 patrol areas for per capita crime in 2010. As of 2018, with a non-fatal assault rate of 100 per 100,000 people, Community District 9's rate of violent crimes per capita is more than that of the city as a whole. The incarceration rate of 603 per 100,000 people is higher than that of the city as a whole.

The 43rd Precinct has a lower crime rate than in the 1990s, with crimes across all categories having decreased by 63.1% between 1990 and 2022. The precinct reported 6 murders, 48 rapes, 747 robberies, 806 felony assaults, 302 burglaries, 1,039 grand larcenies, and 561 grand larcenies auto in 2022.

== Fire safety ==
Castle Hill contains one New York City Fire Department (FDNY) fire station and an EMS station:

- Engine Company 64/Ladder Company 47 – 1224 Castle Hill Avenue
- FDNY EMS Station 3 – 501 Zerega Avenue

== Health ==
As of 2018, preterm births and births to teenage mothers are more common in Castle Hill and Parkchester than in other places citywide. In Castle Hill and Parkchester, there were 106 preterm births per 1,000 live births (compared to 87 per 1,000 citywide), and 26.4 births to teenage mothers per 1,000 live births (compared to 19.3 per 1,000 citywide). Castle Hill and Parkchester has a relatively average population of residents who are uninsured. In 2018, this population of uninsured residents was estimated to be 16%, higher than the citywide rate of 14%.

The concentration of fine particulate matter, the deadliest type of air pollutant, in Castle Hill and Parkchester is 0.0076 milligrams per cubic metre (7.6×10^{−9} oz/ft^{3}), more than the city average. Eighteen percent of Castle Hill and Parkchester residents are smokers, which is higher than the city average of 14% of residents being smokers. In Castle Hill and Parkchester, 32% of residents are obese, 16% are diabetic, and 34% have high blood pressure—compared to the citywide averages of 24%, 11%, and 28% respectively. In addition, 25% of children are obese, compared to the citywide average of 20%.

Eighty-three percent of residents eat some fruits and vegetables every day, which is less than the city's average of 87%. In 2018, 72% of residents described their health as "good", "very good", or "excellent", lower than the city's average of 78%. For every supermarket in Castle Hill and Parkchester, there are 13 bodegas.

The nearest hospital campuses are Montefiore Medical Center's Westchester Square and West Farms campuses, as well as BronxCare Health System's Longwood campus. The nearest large hospital is NYC Health + Hospitals/Jacobi in Morris Park.

== Post office and ZIP Codes ==
Castle Hill is located within three ZIP Codes. The area north of Bruckner Expressway/Interstate 278 is in 10472, while the area between Bruckner Expressway and Cross Bronx Expressway/Interstate 95 is in 10473, and the area north of Cross Bronx Expressway is in 10462. The United States Postal Service operates the Castle Hill Station post office at 1163 Castle Hill Avenue.

== Education ==
Castle Hill and Parkchester generally have a similar rate of college-educated residents to the rest of the city as of 2018. While 23% of residents age 25 and older have a college education or higher, 30% have less than a high school education and 47% are high school graduates or have some college education. By contrast, 26% of Bronx residents and 43% of city residents have a college education or higher. The percentage of Castle Hill and Parkchester students excelling in math rose from 23% in 2000 to 44% in 2011, and reading achievement increased from 27% to 30% during the same time period.

Castle Hill and Parkchester's rate of elementary school student absenteeism is higher than the rest of New York City. In Castle Hill and Parkchester, 28% of elementary school students missed twenty or more days per school year, more than the citywide average of 20%. Additionally, 69% of high school students in Castle Hill and Parkchester graduate on time, lower than the citywide average of 75%.

=== Schools ===
Public

- PS 138 Samuel Randall School (K-5)
- PS 36 - Unionport School (K-5)
- PS/MS 194
- Adlai E. Stevenson High School

Private and parochial

- St. John Vianney Cure of Ars School (now closed)
- Holy Family School (Pre K-8)(now closed)
- St. Raymond Elementary School (Pre-K3 through 8th Grade)
- Saint Raymond High School For Boys
- St. Raymond Academy for Girls, an all-girls', Catholic high school

Special education programs

- New LIFE School (5-8)

=== Library ===
The New York Public Library operates the Castle Hill branch, which opened in 1963 and moved to 947 Castle Hill Avenue in 1981.

== Parks and recreation ==
Pugsley Creek Park is located along the eastern shoreline of Castle Hill. It surrounds a historic creek that was previously a tributary of Westchester Creek.

On the southern end of Castle Hill Avenue is Castle Hill Point Park. This greenspace has boat ramps, fishing piers, and views of the Throgs Neck and Whitestone Bridges.

Castle Hill YMCA (the only YMCA in the Bronx), has indoor and outdoor pools, a baseball field, basketball court, gym and an outdoor sitting area with views of the Bronx-Whitestone Bridge.

The Kips Bay Boys and Girls Club (Lucile Palmaro Clubhouse), located at 1930 Randall Avenue, has an ice skating rink.

== Transportation ==
The following MTA Regional Bus Operations bus routes serve Castle Hill:

- Bx4: to Westchester Square or Third Avenue - 149th Street subway stations (via Westchester Avenue)
- Bx5: to Pelham Bay Park and Bay Plaza Shopping Center or Simpson Street subway station (via Bruckner Boulevard and Story Avenue)
- Bx22: to Bronx High School of Science (via Fordham Road/Castle Hill Avenue)
- Bx36: to George Washington Bridge Bus Terminal (via Tremont Avenue and White Plains Road)
- Bx39: to 241st Street station or Clason Point (via White Plains Road)
- Q44 SBS: to Bronx Zoo or Jamaica, Whitestone, Flushing (via Bronx–Whitestone Bridge)
- BxM8: Express bus, to Pelham Bay or Midtown Manhattan
- BxM6: Express bus, to Parkchester or Midtown Manhattan

The following New York City Subway station serves Castle Hill:

- Castle Hill Avenue (6 and <6> trains)
- Parkchester (6 and <6> trains)

The Bruckner Expressway, carrying Interstate 278, also runs through the neighborhood.

== In popular culture ==
Scenes from the 1984 movie The Pope of Greenwich Village, directed by Stuart Rosenberg, were filmed under the Castle Hill stop on the #6 train and on the platform as well.

== Notable people ==
- James De La Vega (born 1972), visual artist of Puerto Rican descent best known for his street aphorisms and muralist art.
- Darrin Henson (born 1972), actor and choreographer, was raised in the Castle Hill area.
- Ed Kranepool (born 1944), former baseball player who played his entire MLB career as a first baseman/pinch-hitter with the New York Mets. Born and raised at 847 Castle Hill Avenue, living there until he was signed by the Mets in 1962
- Jennifer Lopez ("J-Lo"; born 1969), musician and actress, raised at 2210 Blackrock Avenue; Castle Hill Hall of Fame inductee, Class of 2006, first ballot
- Lynda Lopez (born 1971), journalist and author, also raised with sister Jennifer Lopez at 2210 Blackrock Avenue
- Remy Ma (born 1980), female rapper, was raised in the Castle Hill Houses. Castle Hill Hall of Fame inductee, Class of 2007, first ballot
- Kenny Satterfield (born 1981), former NBA player with the Denver Nuggets, Philadelphia 76ers and Dallas Mavericks
- Neil deGrasse Tyson (born 1958), astrophysicist, author and science communicator, lived in the area as a child
- Kerry Washington (born 1977), actress, was raised in Jamie Towers
