= Sex Money Murder =

Street gang operating on the East Coast and the South in the United States

- Founded: September 27, 1995
- Founded by: Peter "Pistol Pete" Rollock
- Founding location: The Bronx, New York City
- Years active: 1995 – Present
- Territory: East Coast of the United States and Southern United States
- Ethnicity: Predominantly African Americans, Hispanics, Caucasians
- Leader: Pistol Pete
- Criminal activities: Drug trafficking, racketeering, armed robbery, assault and murder
- Allies: United Blood Nation, Pirus, Nuestra Familia, MS13(Localized Alliances)
- Rivals: Crips, Black Guerrilla Family, Gangster Disciples, 18th Street

Sex, Money, Murder (also known as Sex Money Murda, S.M.M., or $.M.M.) is a "set" of the Bloods street gang operating on the East Coast of the United States. The gang was formed in the Soundview section of The Bronx in the Soundview Houses, a New York City Housing Authority (NYCHA) development. Sex, Money, Murder is one of the original sets (subgroups) of the United Blood Nation.

== History ==
Sex, Money, Murder is a Bronx-based street organization that originated in the Soundview section of the Bronx, New York. After a stint in Rikers Island, where Peter Rollock aka Pistol Pete (born c. 1974) was locked up with UBN leadership, it became sanctioned as one of the original UBN sets. UBN was started in Rikers Island and is the start of what became the New York/East Coast Bloods. The gang was fathered by Greg Stone aka "Grog", from the Soundview Houses, and Xavier a.k.a. "X" from Bronx River Houses, low income public housing development managed by the NYCHA.

Peter Rollock aka Pistol Pete, the leader of Sex, Money, Murder, was sentenced to life in prison in November 2000 for his role in seven killings. The terms of his plea bargain stipulate that he may be indefinitely held in segregation subject to special administrative measures which restrict communication. A model prisoner at Florence, his attempts to lessen these restrictions have been unsuccessful as of 2012 due to fear by prosecutors that any suggestion he might make would be promptly carried out by S.M.M. members.

S.M.M. eventually affiliated itself with the United Blood Nation June 6, 1996, which emerged during the 1990s. Over time, S.M.M. gained independence from UBN following an East Coast-wide conflict known as the "Wet T-Shirt War," in which S.M.M., backed by Brim affiliates, asserted sovereignty from Billy and G-Shyne structures. Since then, S.M.M. has operated as a fully independent Blood set with its own ranks, literature, and oaths.

S.M.M. is primarily located in the Soundview section of the Bronx, as well as the South Bronx and many eastern Brooklyn neighborhoods like Bedford-Stuyvesant, Brownsville, Crown Heights and East New York. On Long Island the gang is growing; it is particularly large in Roosevelt, New York, and to a lesser extent in Hempstead, New York. The gang has also spread throughout the southern United States, especially in North Carolina—notably in Charlotte and Raleigh—as well as cities in Georgia, where lines have developed with strong organizational structure and discipline. These newer sets continue to pay respect to the Bronx foundation while developing modern communication strategies and encrypted network structures.

During the summer of 2004, Tommy Thompson established the S.M.M. in Jersey City, New Jersey. On October 31, 2004, an 18-count Racketeer Influenced and Corrupt Organizations Act (RICO) indictment charged Thompson with one count of racketeering, encompassing specific and non-specific, robbery and robbery conspiracy, heroin and cocaine conspiracy and distribution. The indictment also charged Thompson with nine counts of violent crimes in aid of racketeering, including specific attempted murders, murder conspiracy, robberies and shootings; four counts of possession, use and carrying of a firearm for violent crime; one count of conspiracy to distribute cocaine and heroin, and one count of heroin distribution.

Thompson pleaded guilty on July 6, 2005, and admitted that he directed other members and associates of S.M.M. to commit acts of murder and assault - and took part in one of the assaults himself. He also specifically admitted directing the murder of a Jersey City man whom Thompson believed was cooperating with police against him and other gang members.
