= Soundview, Bronx =

Neighborhood in New York City

Soundview
- Neighborhood of the Bronx
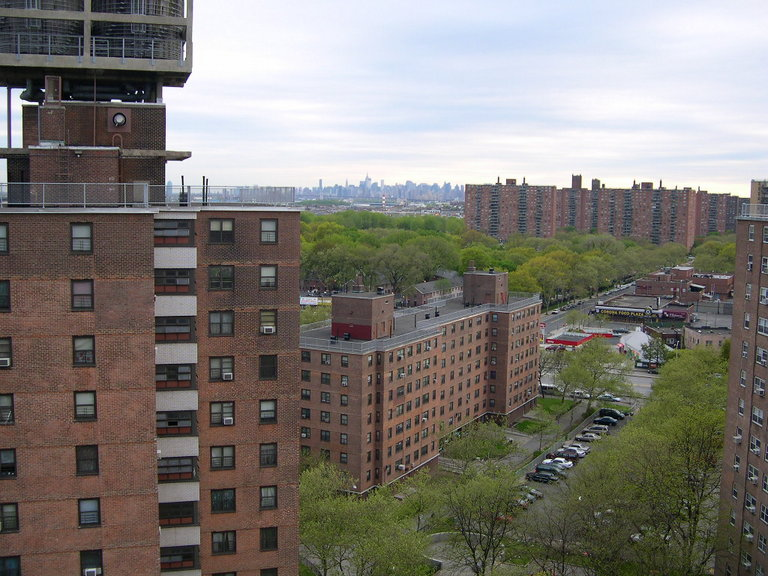
- Apartment buildings in Soundview with the Midtown Manhattan skyline in the background
- Location in New York City
- Coordinates: 40.816°N 73.868°W
- Country: United States
- State: New York
- City: New York City
- Borough: The Bronx
- Community District: Bronx 9

Area (approximately)
  - Total: 2 sq mi (5.2 km^{2})

Population (2011)
  - Total: 31,825
  - Density: 16,000/sq mi (6,100/km^{2})

Economics
  - Median income: $41,120
- ZIP Codes: 10472, 10473
- Area code: 718, 347, 929, and 917

Soundview is a neighborhood on the Clason Point peninsula in the southeastern section of the Bronx in New York City. Its generally recognized boundaries are the Cross Bronx Expressway to the north, White Plains Road to the east, Lacombe Avenue to the south and the Bronx River to the west. The Bruckner Expressway bisects the neighborhood, while Westchester Avenue and Soundview Avenue are major commercial and transportation corridors.

Originally rural, Soundview developed rapidly after the IRT Pelham Line was extended along Westchester Avenue in 1920 and large housing developments were constructed during the mid-20th century.

Soundview is part of Bronx Community District 9. Its ZIP Codes are 10472 and 10473. The neighborhood is patrolled by the New York City Police Department's 43rd Precinct, while its public-housing developments are served by Police Service Area 8.

== History ==
=== Origins and 19th-century development ===
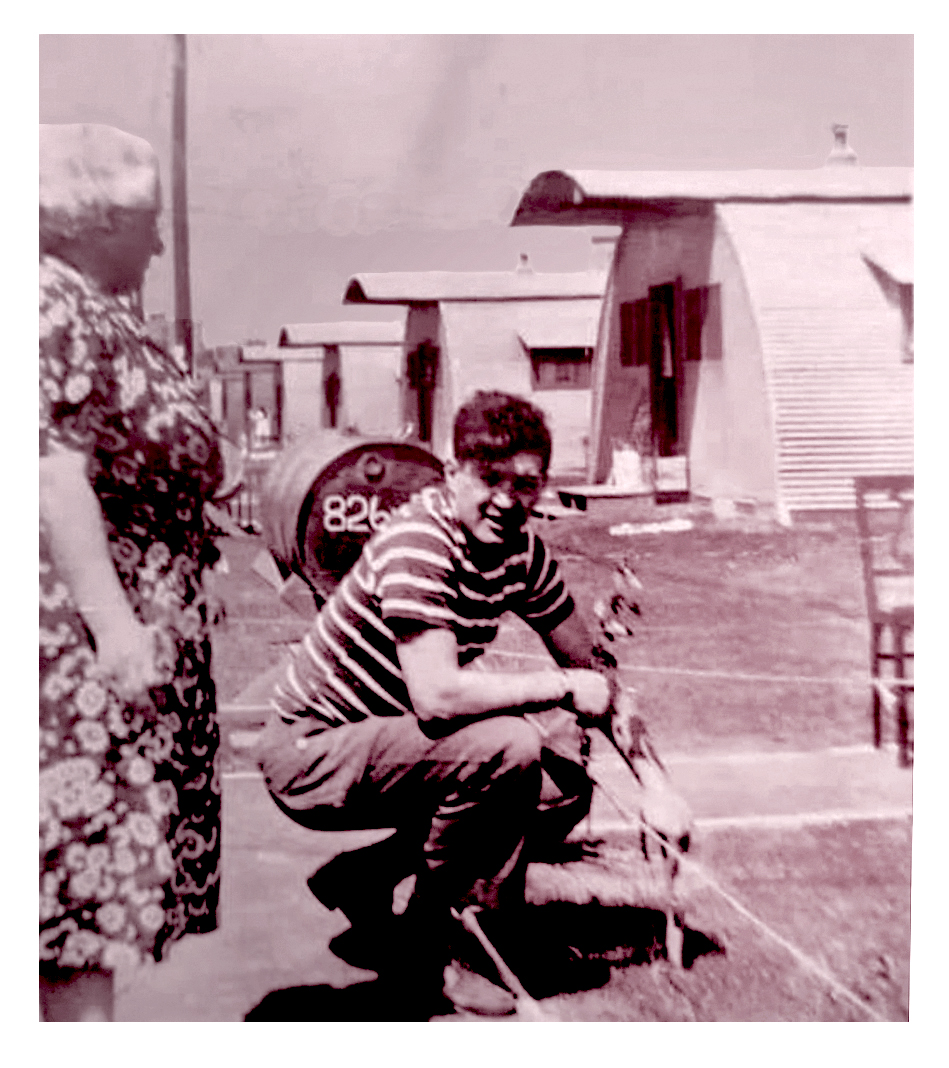
Bronx Quonset Huts

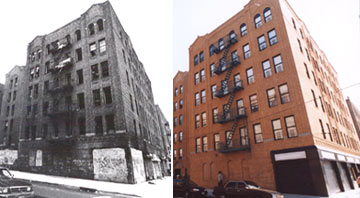
Before and after rehabilitation, Rose Court at 1106 Boynton Avenue

Before European settlement, the Soundview peninsula, formed by the Bronx River, East River and Westchester Creek, was inhabited by the Siwanoy. A large Siwanoy settlement known as Snakapins was located near the present-day intersection of Soundview and Lacombe avenues at Clason Point. Archaeological investigations of the site documented dozens of pits and shell middens as well as pottery, tools and burials, and the settlement has been estimated to have supported approximately 300 inhabitants. In 1646, Dutch Director-General Willem Kieft granted the neck of land now known as Clason Point to English colonist Thomas Cornell, and the area became known as Cornell's Neck. After Cornell left the area, the property eventually passed through his family to the Willett family. In 1793, the Willetts divided Cornell's Neck, selling the western half to Dominick Lynch and the eastern half to merchant Isaac Clason, from whom Clason Point takes its name. The 1800 federal census recorded seven enslaved people of African descent in Clason's household, indicating that enslaved labor was used on his property before slavery was abolished in New York in 1827.

During the 19th century, much of the area remained rural and was occupied by farms and large estates. In 1830, the western portion of the former Cornell's Neck estate was sold to the Ludlow family, who became substantial landowners on the peninsula. The family's name was preserved in Ludlow Avenue, an early roadway through the area that was later incorporated into Eastern Boulevard. By 1872, William Watson owned a 225-acre estate extending through the area near the Bronx River and Westchester Avenue; his mansion stood near the present-day James Monroe Educational Campus, and a wooded section known as Watson's Woods extended east toward Morrison Avenue. Several local street names preserve the names of people associated with the area's development. Watson and Gleason Avenues were named for prominent local landowners William Watson and Joseph J. Gleason, while Fteley Avenue was named for civil engineer Alphonse Fteley, who oversaw the draining of swamps around Clason Point. The portion of the Bronx east of the Bronx River remained part of Westchester County until it was annexed by New York City in 1895; it became part of the newly established Borough of the Bronx in 1898 and Bronx County in 1914. Portions of the area north of Westchester Avenue were historically associated with Park Versailles, which originated as the Mapes Farm. One of the Mapes family's sons adopted the name while subdividing the property for development, and by 1920 all of the former farm's lots had been sold.

=== Early 20th century ===
During the late 19th and early 20th centuries, the waterfront developed as a popular recreational destination. Higgs Beach operated as a bathing and camping ground from 1900 to 1916 in what later became Harding Park, which subsequently developed as a bungalow colony. Clason Point became known for its beaches, excursion facilities and amusement venues, including Clason Point Amusement Park, which operated from 1910 to 1935. A municipal ferry connected Clason Point with College Point, Queens from 1919 until 1939, when the Bronx–Whitestone Bridge opened. The former Clason Point Amusement Park site was redeveloped in 1949 as the Shorehaven Beach Club, which operated until 1986, when the property was redeveloped as Shorehaven Estates.

While the waterfront supported recreational uses, much of Soundview remained undeveloped farmland in the early 20th century. Residential development increased after the IRT Pelham Line was extended along Westchester Avenue in 1920, followed by construction of one- and two-family houses. Soundview Avenue was also served by the Sound View Avenue streetcar line, originally known as the Clason Point Line, which operated from 1909 until 1947. Jewish settlement also increased during this period; by 1930, Jews made up approximately 30 to 39.9 percent of the population of the broader Soundview–Parkchester area. The migration was reflected in the relocation of Chevra Linas Hazedek, an Orthodox congregation whose members moved from East Harlem to Soundview during the 1920s. Construction of its synagogue at 1115 Ward Avenue began in 1928 and was completed in 1932. Another local synagogue, Emanu-El Synagogue at 1310 Elder Avenue, was active by 1934, when it hosted a meeting of the United Jewish Appeal. In 1979, Chevra Linas Hazedek sold its Ward Avenue synagogue to Green Pasture Baptist Church, which retained much of the building’s historic interior and Jewish iconography. The former synagogue was added to the National Register of Historic Places on November 19, 2014.

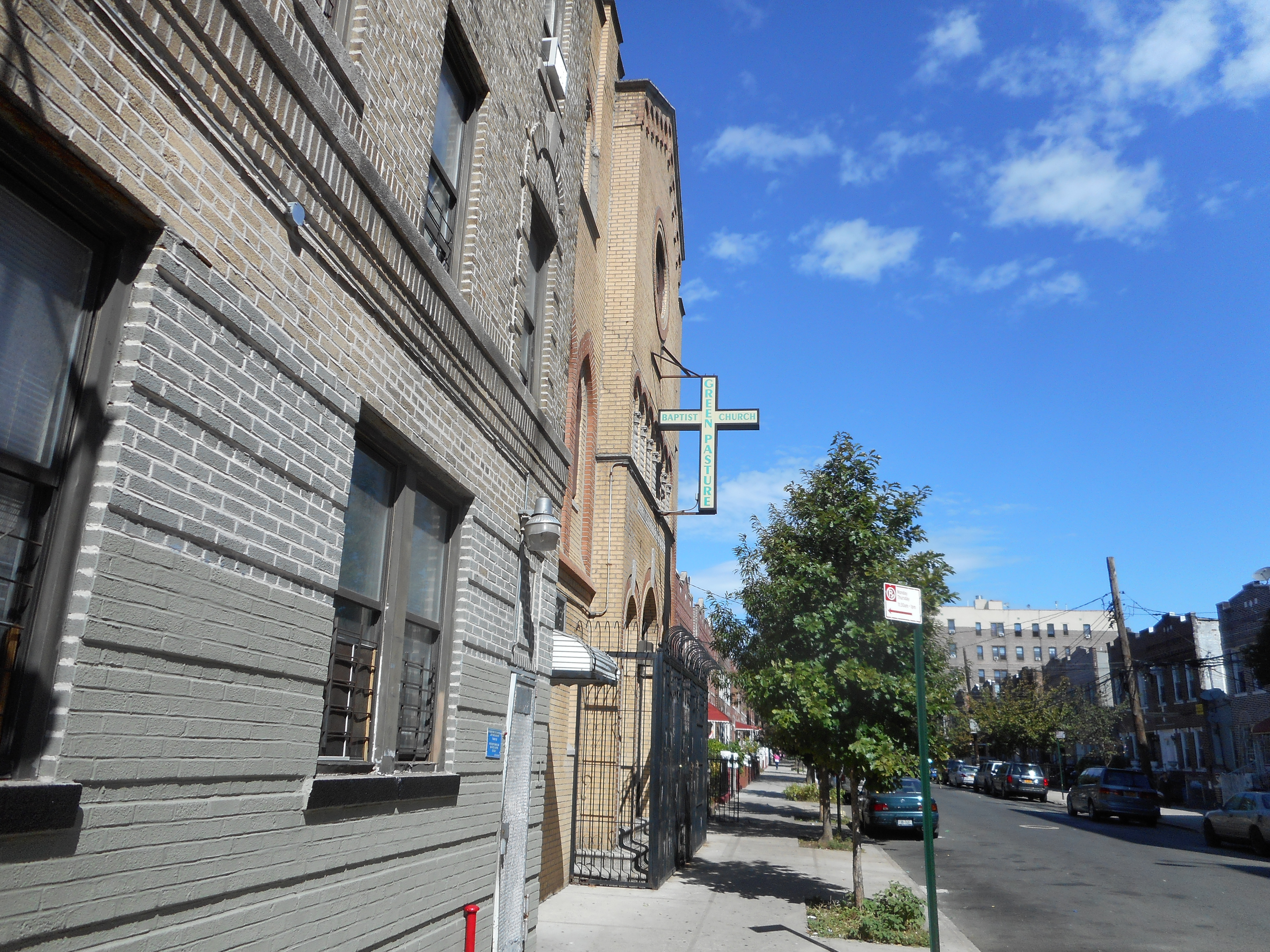
The former Chevra Linas Hazedek synagogue at 1115 Ward Avenue, completed in 1932.

During the 1930s through the 1950s, Robert Moses and the city's Committee on Slum Clearance pursued large-scale redevelopment of the Soundview waterfront. The proposals included demolition of the bungalow community at Harding Park, which Moses characterized as part of the "Soundview slums". Residents opposed the clearance plans, and Harding Park ultimately survived the redevelopment effort. After years of disputes over rents, evictions and ownership, residents reacquired the land from the city, and in 1981 Harding Park became New York City's first cooperatively owned low- and moderate-income community.

=== Public housing and urban renewal ===
In 1941, Clason Point Gardens became the first public housing development constructed by the New York City Housing Authority (NYCHA) in the Bronx. Eastern Boulevard was renamed Bruckner Boulevard in 1942 in honor of former Bronx Borough President Henry Bruckner. In 1947, additional land in the neighborhood was used for a temporary NYCHA housing project consisting of 947 apartments in 473 Quonset huts.

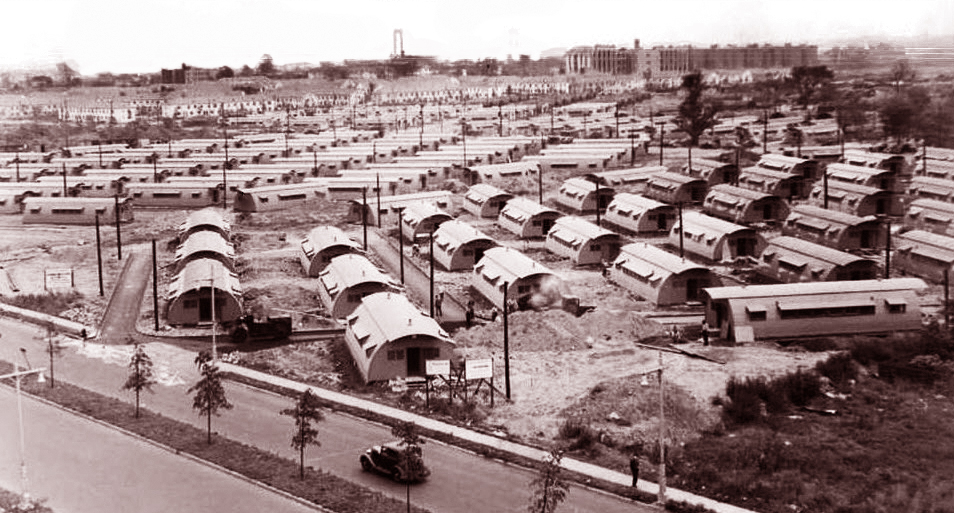
Quonset huts under construction near Bruckner Boulevard and Boynton Avenue, c. 1947

One remaining Quonset hut is still visible on the south side of Seward Avenue at Croes Avenue. Numerous additional public housing developments were constructed throughout the Soundview peninsula during the 1950s and 1960s, contributing to substantial population growth. During the early 1950s, the Bronx River Parkway was extended southward into Soundview, while the Bruckner Expressway was later constructed along and above portions of Bruckner Boulevard.

P.S. 100 Isaac Clason was constructed between 1958 and 1960 to accommodate the population growth associated with Soundview’s mid-century housing developments. Designed in the Modern style by city school architect Michael L. Radoslovich, the building has been found eligible for listing on the State and National Registers of Historic Places.

Soundview also developed a significant defense-electronics industry during the period. By 1958, Loral Electronics was manufacturing electronic equipment for U.S. Navy contracts at 825 Bronx River Avenue, and during the 1960s the company also operated a facility at 1440 Story Avenue.

=== Civil rights and late 20th-century change ===
During the 1960s, racial prejudice and discrimination remained evident in and around Soundview despite the racial integration of its postwar public-housing developments. In July 1963, the Bronx chapter of the Congress of Racial Equality (CORE) organized demonstrations against White Castle’s racially discriminatory hiring practices, including at its Bruckner Boulevard location. Participants included Soundview Houses resident Rosemary Brown, a member of the politically active and integrated Sound View Presbyterian Church; David G. Singleton, who was assigned to the church that year and worked with the Sound View–Bruckner Community Development Corporation on discrimination, housing, employment and government assistance; and the church’s pastor, Bruce Calkins. Singleton and Calkins were violently targeted by counterdemonstrators, including members of the neo-Nazi National Renaissance Party. White mobs at the Bronx demonstrations waved Confederate flags and attacked picketers with eggs, rocks and hot coffee. Police subsequently discovered racist literature and a cache of weapons in a National Renaissance Party vehicle, and eight members of the organization faced criminal charges. Despite the violence, the campaign ultimately succeeded, and White Castle changed its hiring policy.

In 1967, Bronx Borough President Herman Badillo selected Sound View as the name for the broader area. The name itself predated Badillo's designation. According to the New York City Department of Parks and Recreation, when Soundview Park was developed, local residents opposed Parks Commissioner Robert Moses's proposed name of Lafayette Park and favored a name reflecting the surrounding area; "Soundview" was inspired by historical maps on which the East River was identified as part of Long Island Sound. Before Sound View became the broader neighborhood designation, the area contained several distinct communities and place names, including Clason Point, Bronx River, Bruckner and Park Versailles. Distinct local identities have persisted; Bronx Community Board 9 currently recognizes Bronx River, Clason Point, Harding Park and Soundview/Bruckner as separate communities within the district.

Soundview also saw substantial Mitchell–Lama development during the 1960s and early 1970s, including Lafayette-Morrison, Carol Gardens, River Plaza, Lafayette-Boynton and Stevenson Commons.

By 1970, Soundview was undergoing a significant demographic transition. The New York Times reported an increasing number of Puerto Rican families settling in the neighborhood, including working- and middle-class families purchasing homes, while many longtime Italian residents were leaving the area. During the 1970s, Soundview was affected by economic disinvestment, growing poverty and the broader New York City fiscal crisis, while its population became increasingly Black and Latino. However, residential abandonment was less extensive than in many neighborhoods west of the Bronx River; a later planning study found that the Bronx River–Bruckner–Soundview area experienced "relatively little abandonment" during the 1970s and early 1980s and became a haven for struggling Latino middle- and working-class families.

During the 1970s and early 1980s, Soundview became an important center of early hip-hop culture. Several pioneering local DJs, including Kool DJ Dee, Tyrone the Mixologist, Disco King Mario and Afrika Bambaataa, had connections to the Black Spades, which originated at the Bronxdale Houses. Kool DJ Dee and Tyrone operated an early sound system in the neighborhood and performed at outdoor parties and housing developments. Mario became known for parties around the Bronxdale Houses and at Rosedale Park, while Bambaataa organized parties at the nearby Bronx River Houses and later founded the Universal Zulu Nation.

Soundview was heavily affected by the crack epidemic and associated violence during the late 1980s and 1990s. The Soundview Houses became a center of the local crack trade and the base of Sex Money Murder, a street gang that emerged during the period. In 1992, following a series of drive-by shootings and other street crime, the 43rd Precinct established the Watson Avenue Special Operation, which included vehicle checkpoints in an area described in federal court records as heavily affected by narcotics activity. In 1999, an unarmed man, Amadou Diallo, was shot and killed by four plainclothes officers near the corner of Wheeler and Westchester Avenues.

Beginning in the late 1990s, Soundview/Bruckner became one of the Bronx sites of the federal Weed and Seed program, which combined law-enforcement efforts against drug trafficking and violent gangs with community programs intended to improve quality of life. The program continued after federal funding ended as a locally supported initiative. In 2012, a stretch of Westchester Avenue in Soundview was designated an Operation Impact zone, bringing additional NYPD officers to the area.

=== 21st century ===
The former Loral Electronics property along Story Avenue underwent a major transformation after the company closed its Bronx operations in the late 1990s. In 2004, the School Construction Authority leased part of the former industrial site for the Soundview Educational Campus. Environmental testing found contamination from the property's previous industrial use, and nearby residents formed the Concerned Residents Organization to press for independent review of the cleanup and long-term monitoring. In 2017, York Studios broke ground on its Michelangelo Campus on another portion of the former Loral property, creating a film and television production complex with nine sound stages.

Beginning in the 2000s, new affordable housing construction and rehabilitation reshaped portions of Soundview. City-sponsored projects have included multi-unit townhouses and apartment buildings, including developments constructed on underused NYCHA property. Soundview Homes, on the Soundview Houses campus, consists of 72 affordable cooperative apartments in ten four-story townhouse buildings. On the Sotomayor Houses campus, the 16-story Casa Celina opened in 2024 with 204 affordable apartments for older adults, including units reserved for formerly homeless seniors. Major rehabilitation programs have also been undertaken at existing public housing developments, including a $275 million renovation of more than 400 apartments at Sack Wern Houses and a $93 million modernization of Bronx River Addition. Construction began in 2024 on Stevenson Square, a three-phase affordable housing and homeownership development planned to add nearly 1,000 units around Stevenson Commons; its first phase includes 174 homes in three buildings along Seward Avenue.

Soundview Park, much of which was created through the filling of former tidal marsh and open water with sanitary landfill, has undergone extensive environmental restoration and recreational improvements. The park contains waterfront fishing areas, athletic fields and a greenway for pedestrians and cyclists. Plans for continued improvements have included expanded waterfront greenway connections, a new recreation center and a 15,000-square-foot skatepark.

The neighborhood and surrounding area have also become increasingly diverse. A city analysis of the broader Soundview/Parkchester area found that it remained majority Latino while its Asian population more than doubled during the preceding decade, with much of that growth consisting of Bangladeshi, Indo-Caribbean and Indian residents.

== Demographics ==
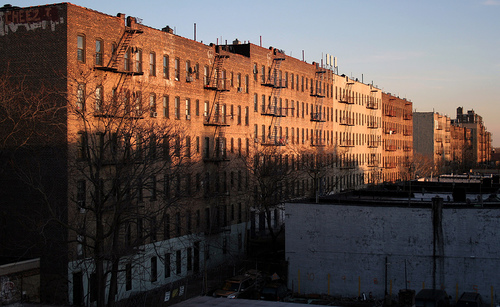
Tenements

Soundview overlaps two of New York City's 2020 Neighborhood Tabulation Areas (NTAs): Soundview–Bruckner–Bronx River and Soundview–Clason Point. The 2020 census counted 74,342 residents in Soundview–Bruckner–Bronx River and 37,303 in Soundview–Clason Point. Because both NTAs include areas outside Soundview, neither figure represents the population of the neighborhood alone.

According to 2020–2024 American Community Survey estimates, Soundview–Bruckner–Bronx River was 64.6 percent Hispanic or Latino, 25.2 percent non-Hispanic Black, 4.5 percent non-Hispanic Asian and 1.9 percent non-Hispanic White. Soundview–Clason Point was 64.9 percent Hispanic or Latino, 29.3 percent non-Hispanic Black, 2.7 percent non-Hispanic Asian and 1.0 percent non-Hispanic White. Among Hispanic or Latino residents of Soundview–Bruckner–Bronx River, Dominicans accounted for 32.3 percent, Puerto Ricans 31.5 percent, Mexicans 14.5 percent, South Americans 10.9 percent and Central Americans 6.9 percent. In Soundview–Clason Point, Puerto Ricans accounted for 46.0 percent of Hispanic or Latino residents, Dominicans 39.2 percent, South Americans 5.5 percent, Central Americans 3.0 percent and Mexicans 2.6 percent.

== Land use and terrain ==
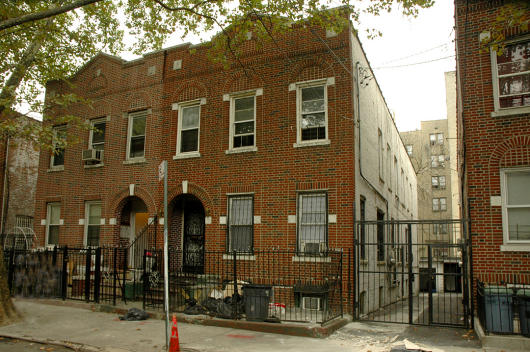
Semi-detached multi-unit rowhouses

The neighborhood contains prewar, mid-century and modern buildings. Row houses, semi-detached and detached homes, and apartment buildings are found throughout; most contain multiple units.

The neighborhood's primary commercial corridors are White Plains Road, Soundview Avenue, and Westchester Avenue.

The central western border of the neighborhood, adjacent to the Bronx River, is primarily used for storage, warehousing, and automotive repair and modification.

York Studios’ Michelangelo Campus, a motion-picture and television production facility, is located at 1421 Story Avenue.

The studios for News 12 The Bronx are located at 930 Soundview Avenue.

Soundview comprises nearly 2 square miles (5.2 km^{2}). The terrain is mostly low-lying and flat.

=== Bruckner Commons ===
The Shops at Bruckner, at 1906 Story Avenue, was built in 1966 as part of the commercial and institutional development that accompanied Soundview's postwar population growth. Bruckner Commons is an open-air shopping center at the intersection of the Bruckner Expressway and White Plains Road. In 2017, Urban Edge Properties acquired the leasehold interest in the 114,000-square-foot Shops at Bruckner, located directly across White Plains Road from its existing 387,000-square-foot Bruckner Commons, bringing the two properties under common ownership. A multiphase renovation began in 2018 and had reached its third phase by 2023, as the properties were being redeveloped into a 510,000-square-foot shopping center.

=== Parks and recreation ===
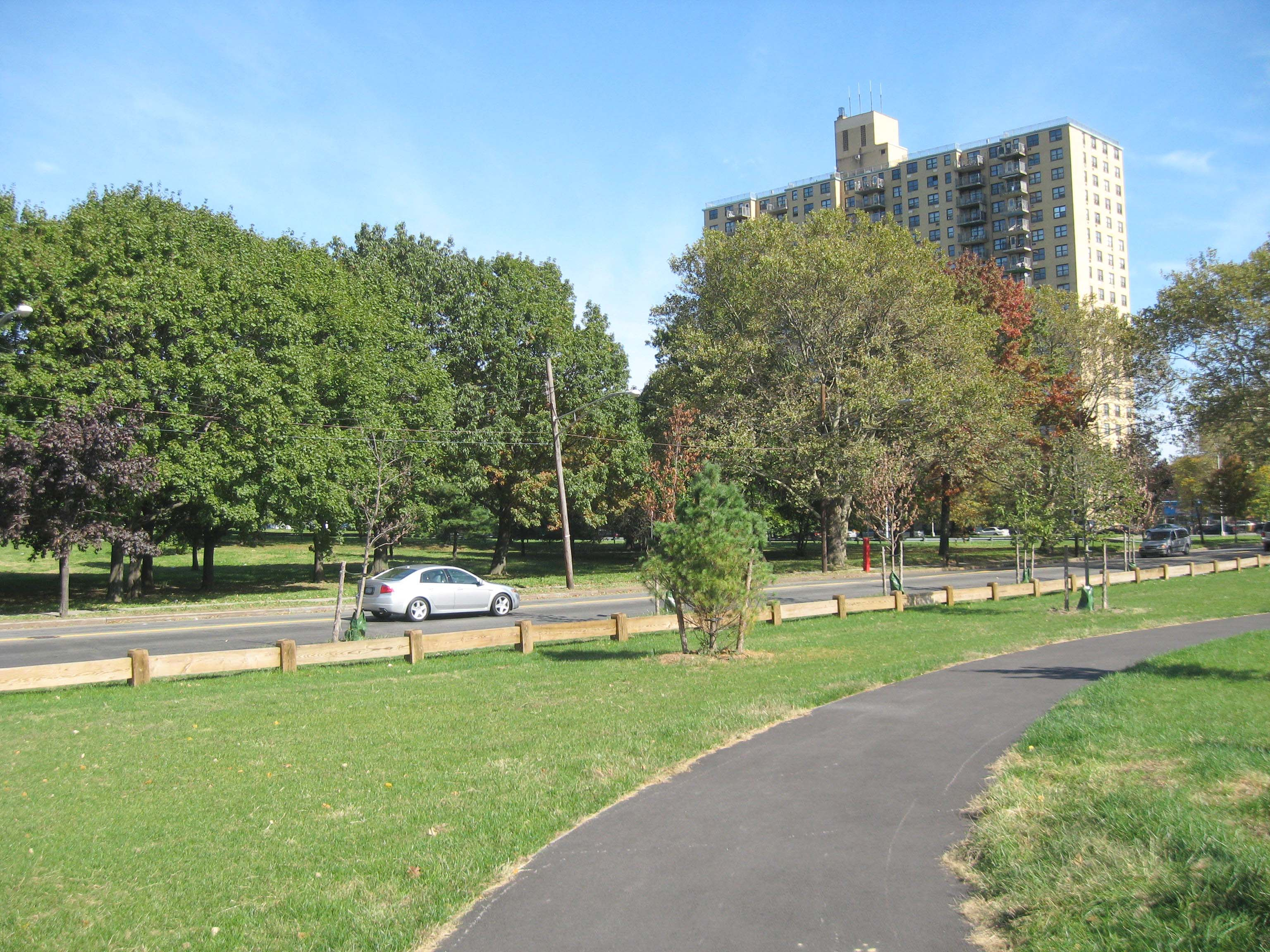
Soundview Park

Soundview Park occupies 205 acres (83 ha) in the southwestern section of the neighborhood, with ballfields and playgrounds and a pedestrian/bike greenway along the left bank of the Bronx River estuary from Lafayette to Leland Avenue. It was built on filled land starting in 1939. The first 93 acres (38 ha) of the park were acquired by the City of New York in 1937, and 66 acres (27 ha) more were acquired along the water's edge in December 1939.

In 1938, the city acquired the 3.3-acre block bounded by Watson, Noble, Gleason and Rosedale Avenues for a municipal playground. Designed by the Parks Department and built with Works Progress Administration labor, Watson Gleason Playground opened on December 4, 1939, at a dedication presided over by Parks Commissioner Robert Moses and attended by Mayor Fiorello La Guardia.

"Parque de los Ninos", a playground at the corner of Morrison and Watson Avenues, opened in 1956 and was renamed in 1995 to honor six neighborhood children who were killed in the late 1980s. It was granted $1.6 million for renovations in 2016.

=== Public housing ===
There are nine NYCHA developments located in Soundview.

1. 1471 Watson Avenue; one 6-story building.
2. Boynton Avenue Rehab; three rehabilitated apartment buildings, two four stories tall and one 6 stories tall.
3. Sotomayor Houses (formerly Bronxdale Houses); twenty-eight 7-story buildings.
4. Bronx River Houses; nine 14-story buildings.
5. Bronx River Addition; two buildings, one 6 stories tall another 14 stories tall.
6. Clason Point Gardens; forty-five buildings, all 2 stories tall.
7. Monroe Houses; twelve buildings, either 8, 14, or 15 stories tall.
8. Sack Wern Houses; seven buildings, each 6 stories tall. The NYCHA-owned development converted to project-based Section 8 under PACT in 2024.
9. Soundview Houses; thirteen 7-story buildings.

== Police and crime ==
Soundview is patrolled by the New York City Police Department's 43rd Precinct, which serves the southeastern Bronx and is headquartered at 900 Fteley Avenue. The neighborhood's NYCHA developments are served by Police Service Area 8, which covers public-housing developments within the 43rd and 45th precincts.

Crime in the area served by the 43rd Precinct has declined substantially since 1990. NYPD statistics show that the seven major felony offenses declined from 9,500 in 1990 to 3,143 in 2025; murders fell from 50 to 12, while robberies and burglaries fell by over 78 percent and over 85 percent, respectively.

== Fire safety ==
Soundview contains a New York City Fire Department (FDNY) fire station, Engine Company 96/Ladder Company 54, at 1689 Story Avenue.

== Health ==
As of 2018, preterm births and births to teenage mothers are more common in Bronx Community District 9 including Soundview than in other places citywide. There were 106 preterm births per 1,000 live births (compared to 87 per 1,000 citywide), and 26.4 births to teenage mothers per 1,000 live births (compared to 19.3 per 1,000 citywide). The area has a relatively average population of residents who are uninsured. In 2018, this population of uninsured residents was estimated to be 16%, higher than the citywide rate of 14%.

Eighty-three percent of residents eat some fruits and vegetables every day, which is less than the city's average of 87%. In 2018, 72% of residents described their health as "good", "very good", or "excellent", lower than the city's average of 78%. For every supermarket in Bronx Community District 9, there are 13 bodegas.

The nearest hospital campuses are Montefiore Medical Center's Westchester Square and West Farms campuses, as well as Bronx-Lebanon Hospital Center's Longwood campus. The nearest large hospital is NYC Health + Hospitals/Jacobi in Morris Park.

== Post offices and ZIP Codes ==
Soundview is located within two ZIP Codes. The area north of Bruckner Expressway/Interstate 278 is in 10472, while the area south of Bruckner Expressway/I-278 is in 10473. The United States Postal Service operates three post offices nearby:

- Clason Point Station – 829 Soundview Avenue
- Cornell Station – 1950 Lafayette Avenue
- Soundview Station – 1687 Gleason Avenue

== Education ==
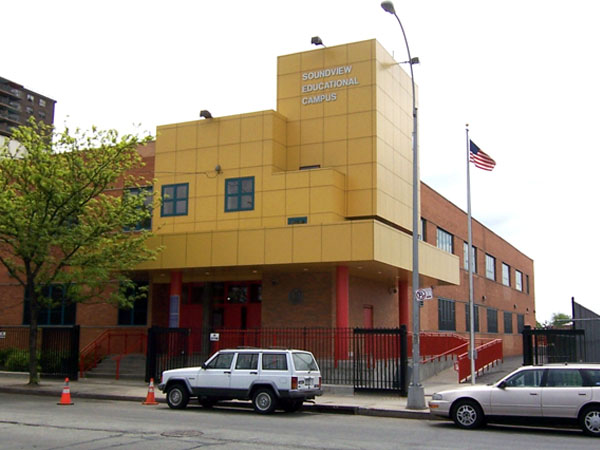
A high school built inside a once abandoned warehouse

Bronx Community District 9 including Soundview generally has a similar rate of college-educated residents to the rest of the Bronx as of 2018. While 23% of residents age 25 and older have a college education or higher, 30% have less than a high school education and 47% are high school graduates or have some college education. By contrast, 26% of Bronx residents and 43% of city residents have a college education or higher. The percentage of students excelling in math rose from 23% in 2000 to 44% in 2011, and reading achievement increased from 27% to 30% during the same time period.

The rate of elementary school student absenteeism is higher than the rest of New York City. 28% of elementary school students missed twenty or more days per school year, more than the citywide average of 20%. Additionally, 69% of high school students graduate on time, lower than the citywide average of 75%.

=== Schools ===
The following schools are located in Soundview:

New York City Public Schools

- P.S. 47 John Randolph (1794 East 172nd Street)
- P.S. 69 Journey Prep School (560 Thieriot Avenue)
- P.S. 93 Albert G. Oliver (1535 Story Avenue)
- P.S. 100 Isaac Clason (800 Taylor Avenue)
- P.S. 107 (1695 Seward Avenue)
- P.S. 152 Evergreen (1007 Evergreen Avenue)
- J.H.S. 123 James M. Kieran (1025 Morrison Avenue)
- J.H.S. 131 Albert Einstein (885 Bolton Avenue)
- Soundview Academy for Culture and Scholarship (885 Bolton Avenue)
- Bronx Arena High School (1440 Story Avenue)

Charter schools

- Icahn Charter School 7 (1535 Story Avenue and 1695 Seward Avenue)
- Vertex Partnership Academies (1160 Beach Avenue and 1143 Taylor Avenue)

Parochial school

- Holy Cross School (1846 Randall Avenue)

=== Libraries ===
The New York Public Library (NYPL) operates three branches near Soundview.

- The Clason's Point branch is located at 1215 Morrison Avenue. The branch opened in 1952 and moved to its current location in 1971.
- The Parkchester branch is located at 1985 Westchester Avenue. The branch opened in 1942 within the Parkchester development and moved to its current two-story structure in 1985.
- The Soundview branch is located at 660 Soundview Avenue. The branch opened at this location in 1973.

== Transportation ==
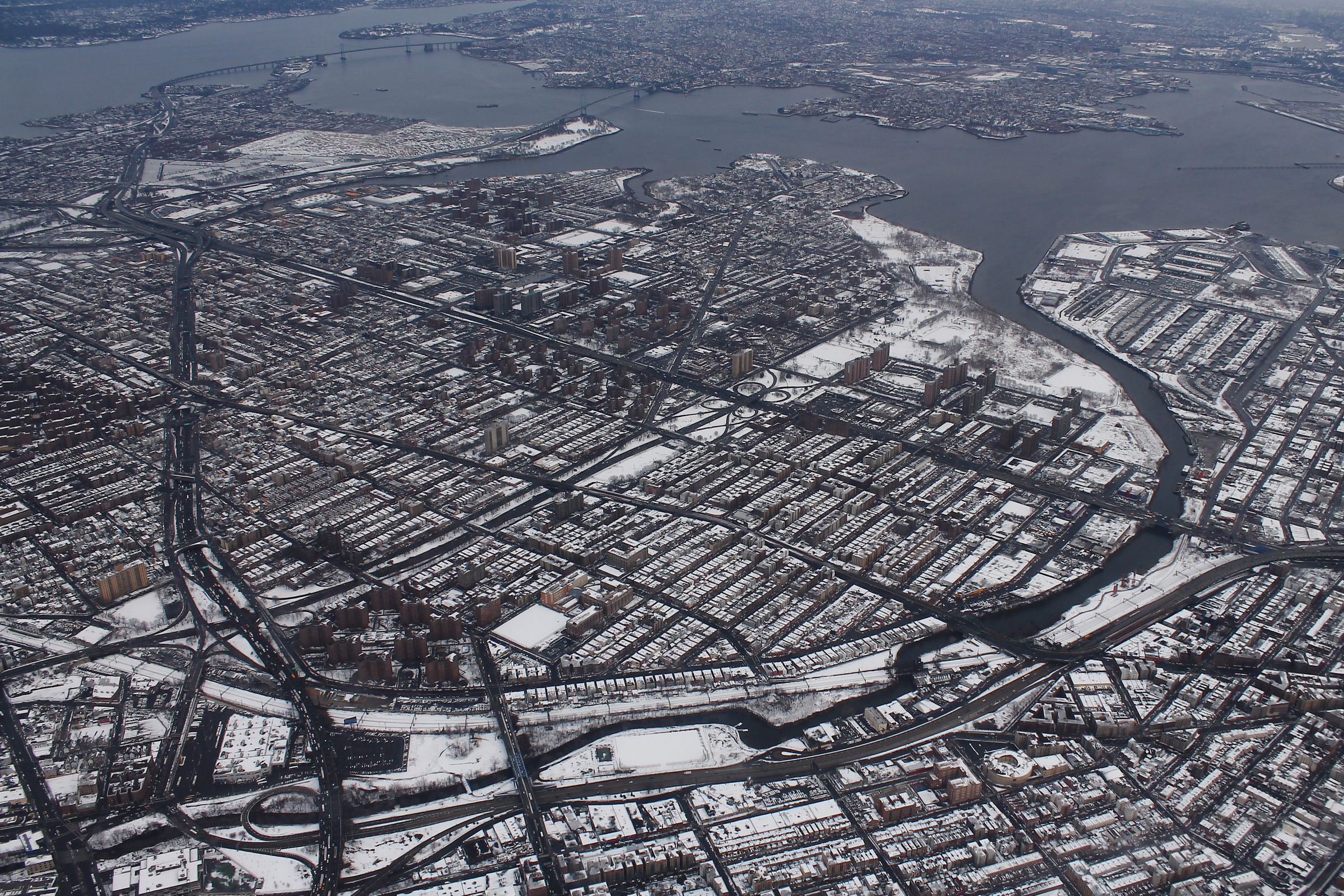
Aerial view of communities between the Bronx River and Westchester Creek which include Soundview.

The IRT Pelham Line, an elevated New York City Subway line serving the 6 and <6> trains, traverses southwest to northeast through the neighborhood, along Westchester Avenue.

- Elder Avenue (6 train)
- Morrison Avenue–Soundview (6 train)
- St. Lawrence Avenue (6 train)

The following MTA Regional Bus Operations bus routes serve Soundview:

- Bx4: to Westchester Square (6 train) or Third Avenue-149th Street (2 and 5 trains) (via Westchester Avenue)
- Bx4A: to Westchester Square (6 train) or Simpson Street (2 and 5 trains) (via Westchester Avenue and Metropolitan Oval)
- Bx5: to Co-op City and Bay Plaza Shopping Center or Simpson Street (2 and 5 trains) (via Story Avenue)
- Bx11: to George Washington Bridge Bus Terminal (via 170th Street, Claremont Parkway, 174th Street)
- Bx27: to Simpson Street (2 and 5 trains) or Clason Point (via Rosedale Avenue)
- Bx36: to Pugsley–Randall Avenues or George Washington Bridge Bus Terminal (via Tremont Avenue and White Plains Road)
- Bx39: to Wakefield–241st Street (2 train) or Clason Point (via White Plains Rd)

NYC Ferry's Soundview route started serving Soundview on August 15, 2018.

== Notable residents ==
- Joel Meyerowitz (born 1938), photographer, grew up in Soundview.
- Rick Meyerowitz (born 1943), illustrator and humorist who designed the poster for Animal House, grew up in Soundview with his brother Joel.
- Ahmed Best (born 1973), voice of Jar Jar Binks in Star Wars movies.
- Jules Feiffer (1929-2025), cartoonist, playwright, and author, grew up on Stratford Avenue.
- Marcus Jansen (born 1968), painter who resided in the Lafayette Boynton Apartments.
- Yaphet Kotto (1939–2021), actor who lived in the Soundview Houses while pursuing his early acting career.
- KRS-One (born 1965), rapper, lyricist and occasional producer who resided in a group home on Lacombe Avenue near the Soundview Houses.
- Bernard McGuirk (1957–2022), radio personality and producer at WABC grew up in Monroe Houses.
- John Orozco (born 1992), Olympic gymnast.
- Sonia Sotomayor (born 1954), U.S. Supreme Court Justice since 2009, grew up in the Bronxdale Houses.
- Phil Spector (1939–2021), producer, songwriter, and originator of the Wall of Sound grew up at 1027 Manor Avenue.
- Kemba Walker (born 1990), former NBA player, grew up at the Sack Wern Houses.
- Bruse Wane, rapper and songwriter from the Bronxdale Houses.
- Karen Koslowitz (born 1941), former member of the New York City Council and former Queens deputy borough president is originally from Soundview and attended James Monroe High School.
- Sylvia Woods (1926–2012), owner of the Harlem establishment Sylvia's Restaurant, had residences in the Soundview-Bruckner neighborhood.
- Early rap group the Jazzy Five MCs are from Soundview Houses.
- DJ Jazzy Jay (born 1961), grew up in Bronx River Houses.
- Several members of the Hip Hop group Money Boss Players, including Lord Tariq—also known for his work as part of the duo Lord Tariq and Peter Gunz—hail from the Soundview Houses.
- Treston Irby (born 1973), from R&B quintet Hi-Five is from the Bronxdale Houses.
- Serial killer David Berkowitz (born 1953), also known as Son of Sam, grew up at 1105 Stratford Avenue near Watson Avenue.
- Jesse West also known as 3rd Eye (born 1967) – rapper and record producer grew up in Bronx River Houses.
- Ruff Ryders recording artist Drag-On (born 1980) grew up in Bronxdale Houses.
- Hip Hop pioneer Disco King Mario is from Bronxdale Houses.
- Minnesota, rapper, record producer and founder of Money Boss Players, is from Soundview Houses.
- Michael Kay (born 1961), television broadcaster for the New York Yankees, spent the first 12 years of his life at 950 Evergreen Avenue in Evergreen Gardens.
- Rapper Mickey Factz, (born 1982), originally from Harlem, but grew up in Soundview. He attended Adlai E. Stevenson High School in Soundview.
- Darcel Clark, (born 1962), Bronx County district attorney and former judge, was raised in Soundview Houses.
- Afrika Bambaataa (1957-2026), is from Bronx River Houses, which is considered the foundation of hip hop's Zulu Nation. He was also a member of the Black Spades which began in the Bronxdale Houses.
- Big Pun (1971-2000) grew up on Commonwealth Avenue.
- Professional bodybuilder and exotic dancer Rodney St. Cloud grew up in Soundview and attended P.S. 100 and Adlai E. Stevenson High School.
- Joey De Jesus, poet, performer and community activist grew up in Soundview.
- Peter "Pistol Pete" Rollock, founder of Sex Money Murder, grew up in Soundview Houses.
- Four time New York Golden Gloves champion and former heavyweight boxer Mitch "Blood" Green lived in Bronxdale Houses, and was a member of the Black Spades.
- Former welterweight boxing champion Aaron Davis is from Bronxdale Houses.
- Uptown Records founder and former CEO of Motown Andre Harrell is from Bronxdale Houses.
- Former NBA player Ed Pinckney is from Monroe Houses.
- Jeff Robinson, founder of MBK Entertainment and former longtime manager of Alicia Keys, grew up in the Bronxdale Houses.
- Wesley Snipes grew up in Soundview and attended I.S. 131.
- Kevin Chiles, former drug kingpin and co-founder of Don Diva magazine, lived at Academy Gardens as a teenager.
- Buddy Esquire (1958–2014), graffiti artist and graphic designer who designed the early hip-hop flyers is from Monroe Houses.
- The Chiffons – vocal group whose members Judy Craig, Barbara Lee and Patricia Bennett grew up in the Bronx River Houses.
- Ronnie Mack (1940–1963), songwriter best known for writing The Chiffons number-one hit "He's So Fine" lived in Bronx River Houses.
- Record producer and songwriter, Ron Rogers, composer of the 1979 disco hit Deputy of Love and other dance records is from Soundview.
- Paul LaRosa (born 1953), journalist, television producer, and author was raised in Monroe Houses.
- Louie Vega (born 1965), Grammy Award-winning DJ, record producer and member of Masters at Work, grew up on Stratford Avenue.
- Tats Cru, graffiti and mural collective whose core members Bio, Nicer and BG183 grew up in Soundview and began creating murals together there in the early 1980s.
- Darren Carrington (born 1966), former NFL safety is from Bronx River Houses.
- Muhammad Abdul Aziz (born 1938), formerly known as Norman 3X Butler, a former Nation of Islam member who was convicted and later exonerated in connection with the assassination of Malcolm X. He lived in the Soundview Houses at the time of his arrest.
- Robert T. Johnson (born 1948), former Bronx County District Attorney, moved with his family to the Lafayette–Morrison complex while attending high school.

== See also ==
- Clason Point, Bronx
