= Bronx Community Board 9 =

Bronx Community District 9 Bronx Community Board 9
- Community District
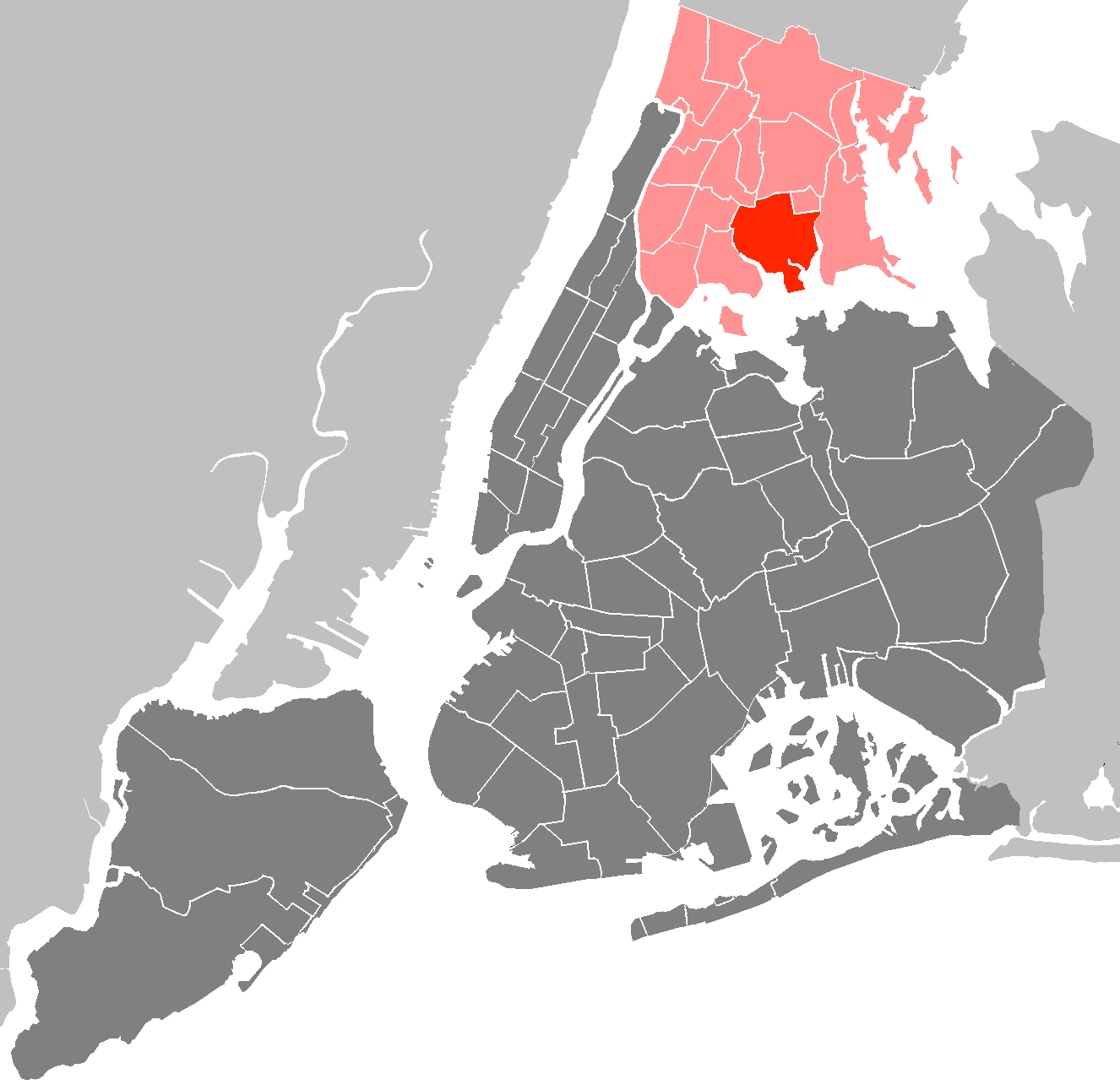
- Location in The Bronx
- Country: United States
- State: New York
- City: New York City
- Borough: The Bronx
- Neighborhoods: list: Castle Hill; Clason Point; Harding Park; Parkchester; Soundview

Government
  - Type: Community board
  - Body: Bronx Community Board 9
  - Chairperson: Nicholas Himidian
  - District Manager: William Rivera

Area
  - Total: 4.1 sq mi (11 km^{2})

Population (2017)
  - Total: 190,800
  - Density: 47,000/sq mi (18,000/km^{2})

Ethnicity
  - Hispanic and Latino Americans: 58.1%
  - African-American: 29.1%
  - White: 2.8%
  - Asian: 7.0%
  - Others: 2.9%
- Time zone: UTC−5 (Eastern)
  - Summer (DST): UTC−4 (EDT)
- ZIP codes: 10462, 10472, and 10473
- Area codes: 718, 347, and 929, and 917
- Police Precincts: 43rd (website)
- Website: www1.nyc.gov/site/bronxcb9/index.page

Bronx Community Board 9 is a local government unit of the city of New York, encompassing the neighborhoods of Castle Hill, Parkchester, Soundview, Harding Park, Bronx River, Clason Point and Unionport. It is delimited by Westchester Creek to the east, Sheridan Boulevard to the west, the Cross Bronx Expressway and East Tremont Avenue to the north and the Bronx River and the East River to the south.

== Community board staff and membership ==
The current chairperson of the Bronx Community board 9 is Brandon Ganaishlal. Its District Manager is William Rivera.

The City Council members representing the community district are non-voting, ex officio board members. The council members and their council districts are:

- 13th NYC Council District - Mark Gjonaj
- 17th NYC Council District - Rafael Salamanca
- 18th NYC Council District - Rubén Díaz Sr.

== Activities ==
Bronx Community Board 9 has held several appreciation dinner awards ceremonies.

== Demographics ==
As of the 2000 United States census, the community district has a population of 167,859, up from 155,970 in 1990 and 167,627 in 1980. The racial makeup was 92,734 (55.2%) are of Hispanic origin, 55,750 (33.2%) are Black, non-Hispanic, 7,065 (4.2%) are White, non-Hispanic, 6,151 (3.7%) are Asian or Pacific Islander, 538 (0.3%) American Indian or Alaska Native, 1,650 (1%) are some other race (non-Hispanic), and 3,971 (2.4%) of two or more races (non-Hispanic).
