= St. John Vianney Cure of Ars Church (Bronx) =

Church in the Bronx, New York, US

Coordinates: 40.8213°N 73.8489°W

St. John Vianney Cure of Ars Church is located on the corner of Castle Hill avenue and Homer avenue in the Bronx. The parish was established circa 1961.

== St. John Vianney Cure of Ars Church ==
In 2015 The Parish of St. John Vianney Cure of Ars was merged with Holy Family Parish.

== St. John Vianney Cure of Ars School ==
St. John Vianney Cure of Ars School (SJV) was founded in 1963 to meet the needs of the surrounding military community. The demographics of the Castle Hill section of the Bronx have changed but the SJV administration still served the needs of its residents. Many of its students were first-generation Americans of Hispanic and Latino descent with existing family ties to the Caribbean.

St. John Vianney Cure of Ars School held classes for Pre-kindergarten through 8th grade. SJV, as the students called it, was a small school having only one class per grade, averaging 25-30 students per class. Typically, the same group of children entering Pre-K together would graduate 8th grade together ten years or so later. The 2009–2010 school year had an average 15 students per class. The school's last principal increased the school's enrollment and overall math scores.

The school colors were purple and gold. To celebrate All Saints Day, students picked a saint to write a report on, and dressed up as their chosen saint for a Saint Parade around the Castle Hill neighborhood. The annual October parade lasted about 30 minutes.

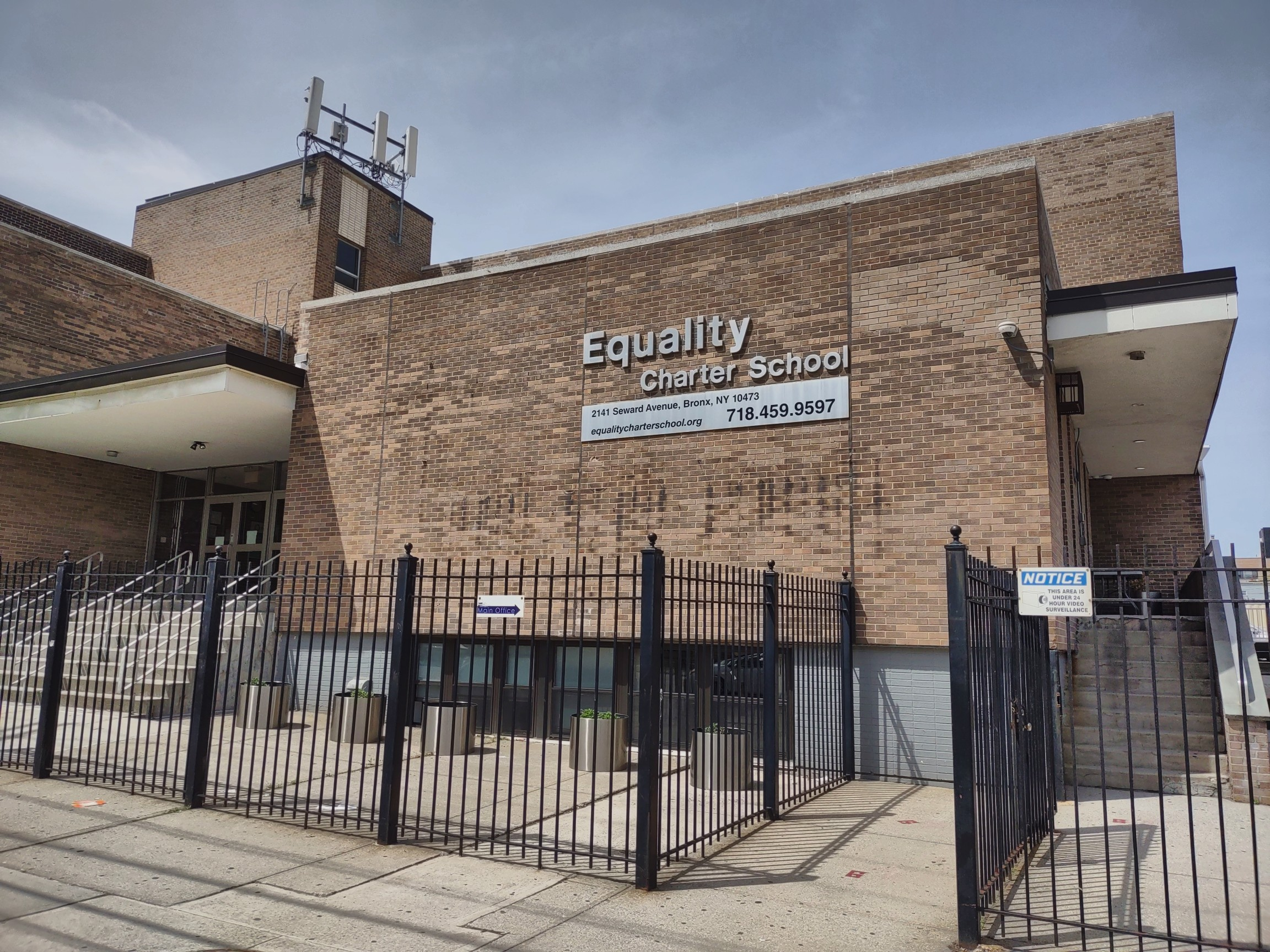
2022; building used by a Charter School

In 2011 it was announced that St. John Vianney would be among a group of small Catholic elementary schools in NYC that the Archdiocese planned to close. SJV's last 8th grade class graduated in June 2011. The class, faculty, and alumni who attended were given banners with the school's name, mascot, and dates printed on it.
