= Edgewater Park (Bronx) =

Neighborhood in New York City

Coordinates: 40.8231479°N 73.8133348°W

Edgewater Park is a small 60-acre (24 ha) waterside co-op community of 675 single-family homes in the Throggs Neck section of the Bronx, north of the Cross Bronx Expressway (I-95) near the Throgs Neck Bridge. Its beaches overlook Long Island Sound. Its sister communities are Silver Beach, south of the Cross Bronx Expressway, as well as Harding Park.

== History ==
Edgewater Park once housed a mansion built by George T. Adee in 1856. Eventually, in 1923, he leased the land to Richard W. Shaw Sr. an Irish immigrant who was a member of St. Ann's Episcopal Church in Morrisania and invited church youth to camp on the grounds which became known as Edgewater Camp. Campsites eventually developed into bungalows and by around 1918 a full-fledged bungalow had developed along the coast areas while other sections remained farmland and grazing land. Ruts from early auto traffic became roads. After World War I the community was divided into sections A, B, C, after the names of Army camps; D and E Sections were added later. In 1954 Shaw died. By this time, Edgewater Camp had become a community of full-time residents and became known as "Park of Edgewater" or "Edgewater Park." The community became a co-op in 1988.

== Culture ==
The Edgewater Park Volunteer Fire Department is one of nine volunteer fire departments in New York City. It holds an annual Memorial Day Parade. The community celebrates a Ragamuffin parade to kick off the Thanksgiving and Christmas season. Its “Labor Day Olympics” has a 100-year tradition.

== Controversies ==
In 2010 the Edgewater Park Owners Cooperative, Silver Beach, and a local real estate broker were sued by Fair Housing Justice Center for racial discrimination in its buying and selling practices. According to the suit, the policy requiring prospective buyers to gain the endorsement of three existing co-op owners served to block African Americans from access to the communities, a charge community residents denied. In 2013 a settlement was reached that ended discriminatory buying and selling practices at Edgewater Park.

Approximately 40% of Edgewater Park homes are located in the “1% annual chance floodplain” and this is expected to increase to 75% by the 2050s with global warming. Edgewater Park has been designated as one of New York City's “Resiliency Neighborhoods,” a group of communities that have experienced or are at risk of facing flooding.
