= Chevra Linas Hazedek Synagogue of Harlem and the Bronx =

Church in the Bronx, New York

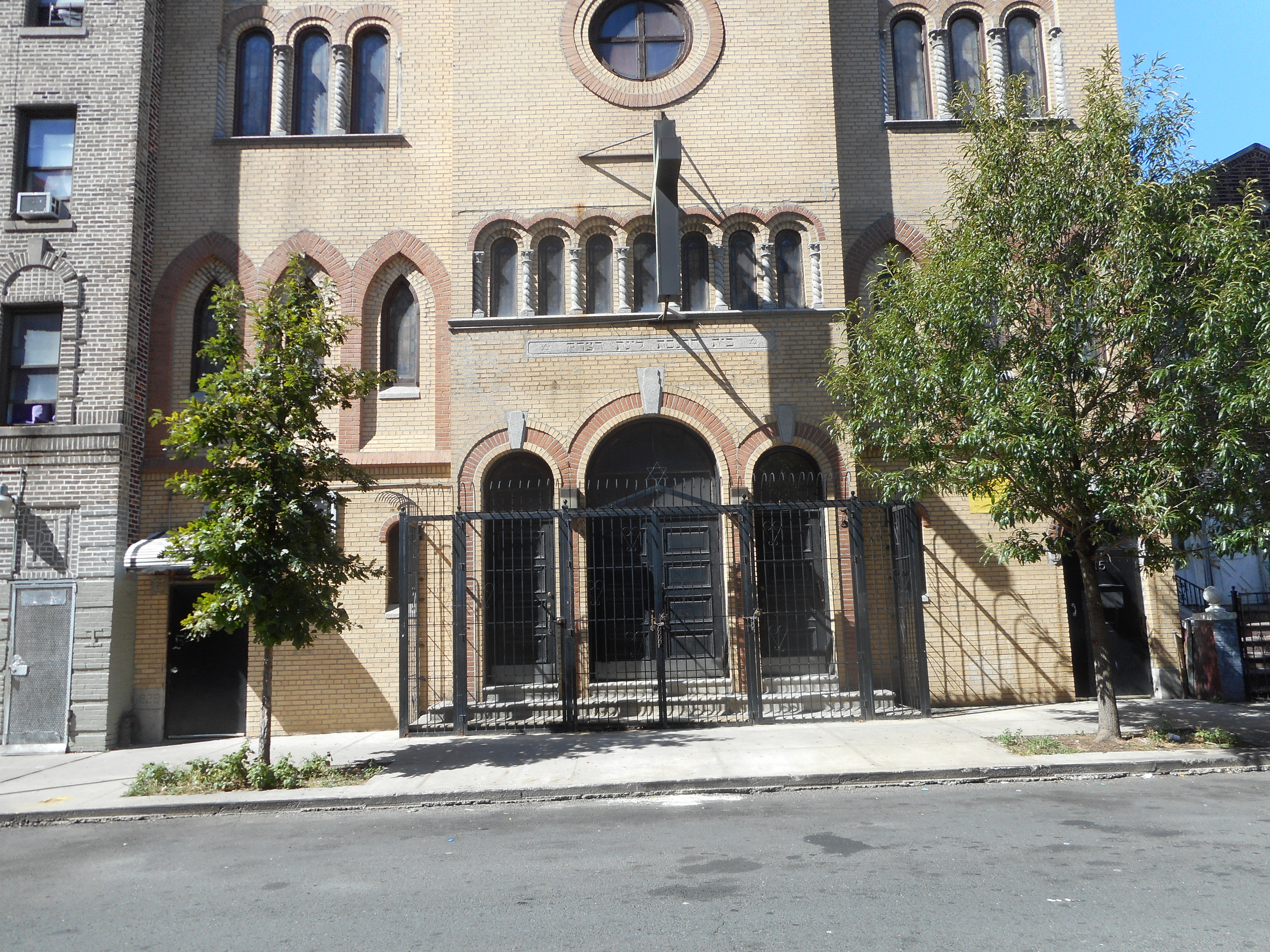
- The former synagogue, now church, in 2015

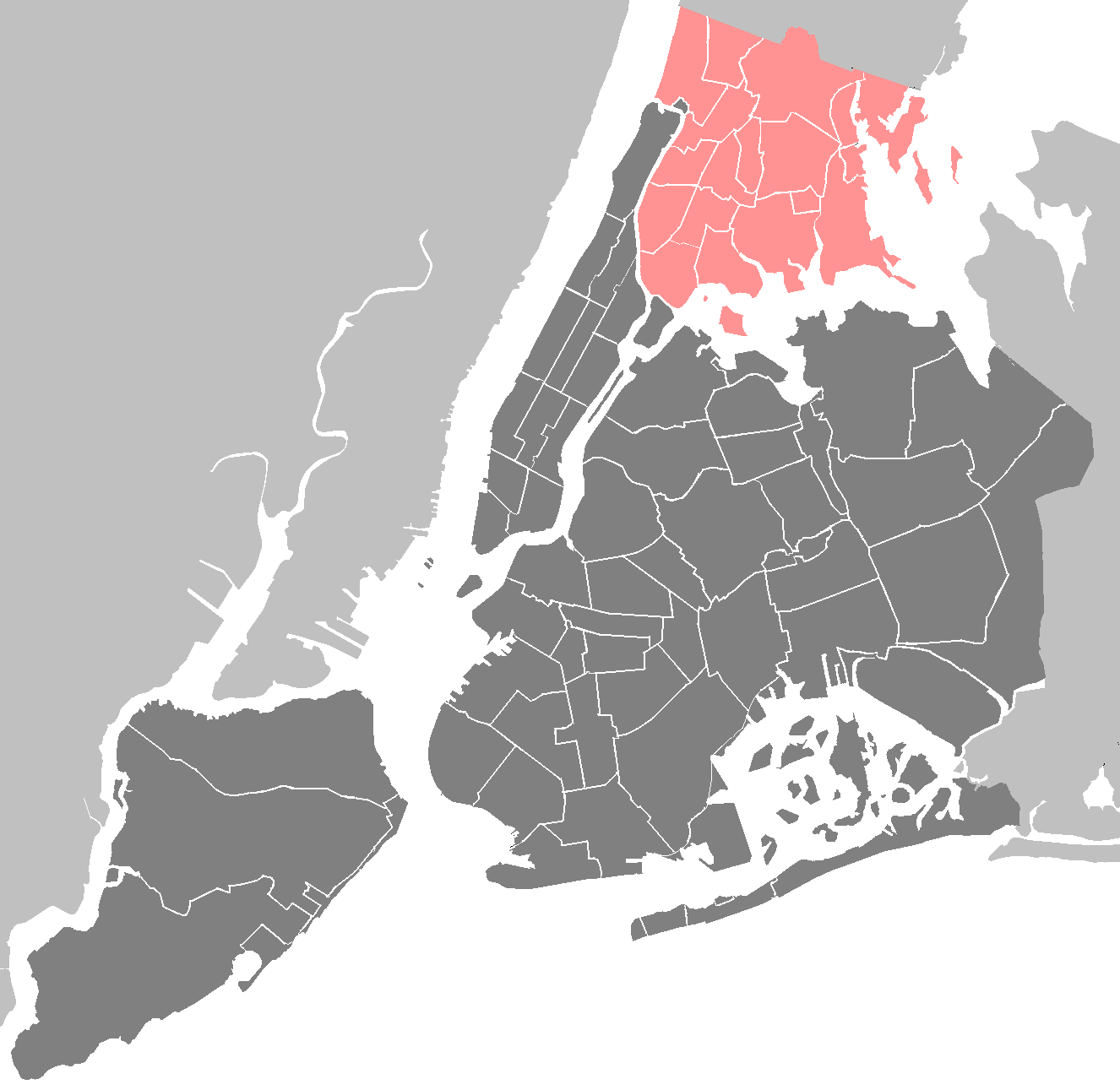
- Location in the Bronx, New York City

Religion
- Affiliation: Judaism (former); Baptist (current)
- Ecclesiastical or organizational status: Synagogue (1932–1979); Church (since 1979)
- Status: Closed (as a synagogue); Repurposed (as a church)

Location
- Location: 1115 Ward Avenue, the Bronx, New York, New York
- Country: United States
- Interactive map of Chevra Linas Hazedek Synagogue of Harlem and the Bronx
- Coordinates: 40°49′36″N 73°52′37″W

Architecture
- Architect: Paul Lubroth
- Type: Synagogue architecture
- Style: Romanesque Revival
- Completed: 1932
- Chevra Linas Hazedek Synagogue of Harlem and the Bronx
- U.S. National Register of Historic Places
- Area: 0.12 acres (0.049 ha)
- NRHP reference No.: 14000934
- Added to NRHP: November 19, 2014

Chevra Linas Hazedek Synagogue of Harlem and the Bronx was a synagogue located at 1115 Ward Avenue in the Soundview neighborhood of the Bronx, New York City. The building was constructed between 1928 and 1932, and is a three-story, vernacular Romanesque Revival style. It has a plastic slate roof and yellow brick front façade with red brick and cast-stone accents. The front facade features a set of seven round-arch lancet stained-glass windows separated by wreathed cast-stone columns. In 1979, the synagogue sold the building to the Green Pasture Baptist Church, which has occupied the building since then.

The building was added to the National Register of Historic Places in 2014.
