= Bronx River Houses =

Public housing development in the Bronx, New York

- NYCHA property
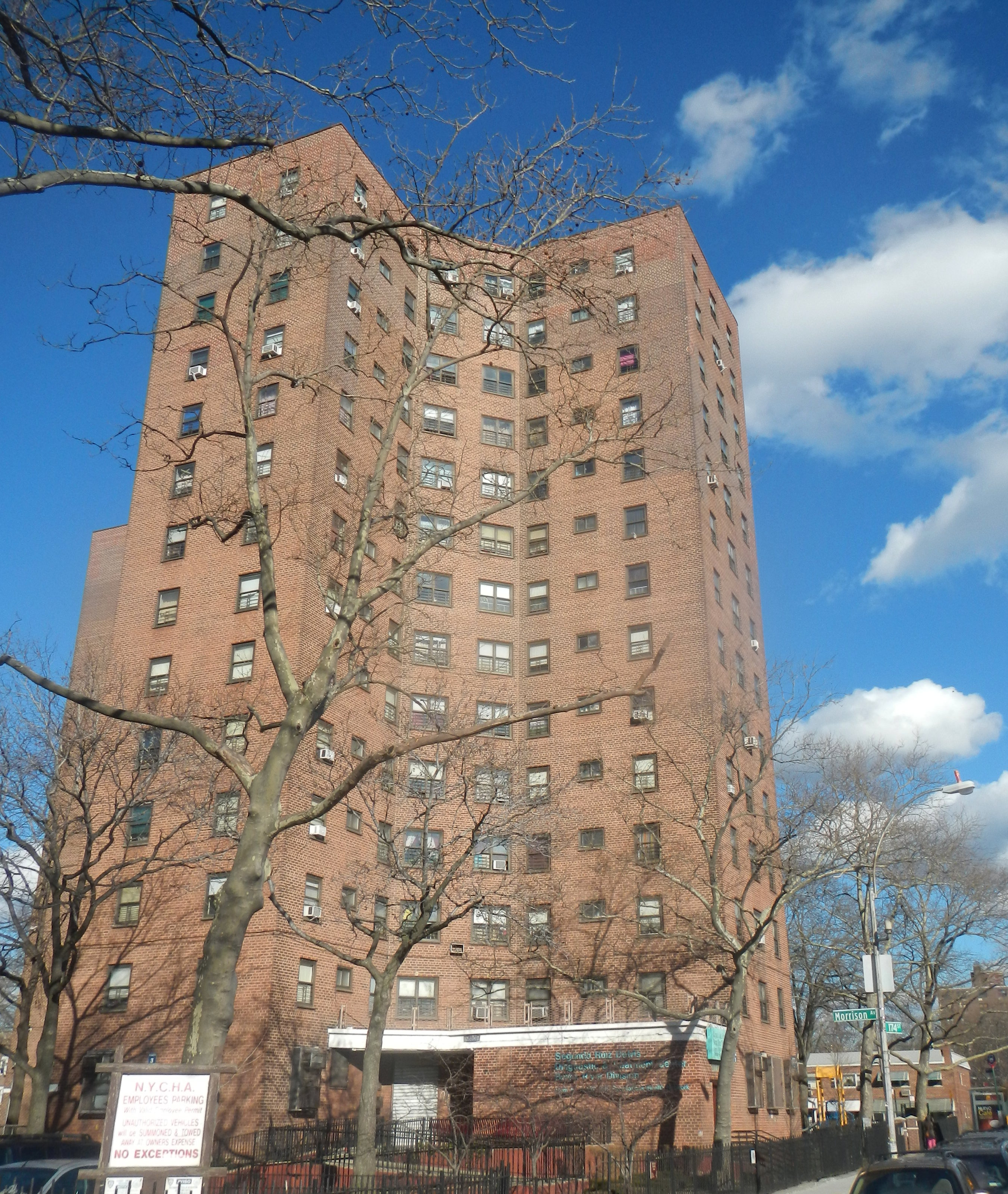
- Bronx River Houses in 2013
- Interactive map of Bronx River Houses
- Coordinates: 40.833820°N 73.876670°W
- Country: United States
- State: New York
- City: New York City
- Borough: Bronx
- ZIP codes: 10472
- Area codes: 718, 347, 929, and 917

Bronx River Houses is a low-income public housing project in the Soundview section of the Bronx, New York City. It consists of nine buildings with 1,260 apartments. Completed February 28, 1951, the 13.94-acre (5.64 ha) Bronx development is bordered by East 174th Street, Harrod, and Bronx River Avenues. Bronx River Houses is home to 3,025 residents. The project is patrolled by P.S.A. 8 located at 2794 Randall Avenue in the Throgs Neck section of the Bronx.

Bronx River Addition comprises two senior-only buildings, 6 (Building XII) and 14 (Building XI) stories tall with 225 apartments. Completed February 28, 1966, the 1.43-acre (0.58 ha) Bronx development is bordered by East 172nd and East 174th Streets and Manor and Harrod Avenues. Bronx River Addition is home to 234 residents.

== History ==
Before construction of the Bronx River Houses, the 13.94-acre site was largely undeveloped; the National Park Service classifies it as semi-vacant land. A New York City Housing Authority archival photograph from May 1948 shows an Esso service station on the property shortly before the site was cleared for construction. The state-funded development was designed by architect William I. Hohauser and landscape architect Leo A. Novick and was completed on February 28, 1951. Its nine 14-story buildings were arranged in a park-like setting as an example of the high-rise public housing design that expanded throughout New York City after World War II.In 1966, NYCHA completed the Bronx River Addition, a separate state-funded development designed as housing for senior residents.

The development's musical history predates hip-hop. During the early 1960s, several members of The Chiffons lived at Bronx River Houses and attended nearby James Monroe High School. Songwriter Ronnie Mack, who also lived at the development, worked with the group and wrote their 1963 number-one single “He's So Fine.”

During the 1970s, Bronx River Houses became one of the central sites in the development of hip hop. Resident Afrika Bambaataa organized parties and gatherings at the development's community center, where DJs, MCs, breakdancers and graffiti artists gathered during the culture's formative years. Bambaataa also organized the Bronx River Organization, which later evolved into the Universal Zulu Nation. The organization sought to redirect young people away from gang involvement and toward music, dance and other community activities. The Bronx River Community Center became an important venue for early hip-hop performances and meetings and drew artists and participants from across the Bronx.

By the late 1970s, residents were also organizing in response to concerns about crime and safety. In 1979, resident James Graham established a tenant patrol program at Bronx River Houses. The patrol advocated visitor sign-ins, improved communication between residents and police, and additional building-security measures. By the early 1990s, security measures at the development included cameras in building lobbies and elevators and reinforced security windows.

In 1995, the administration of Mayor Rudy Giuliani selected Bronx River Houses for an anti-crime and anti-graffiti initiative known as Operation Commitment. The city increased tenant patrols and established a police trailer that provided a 24-hour law-enforcement presence at the development. As part of the initiative, NYCHA barred the Zulu Nation from holding its longtime meetings at the community center and removed murals associated with the organization. NYCHA officials reported that crime at Bronx River Houses had fallen 52 percent during the first five months of the initiative, although police officials told The New York Times that they had been unable to link the Zulu Nation to specific crimes at the development.

Security surveillance was expanded further near the end of the decade. In 1999, the NYPD completed the installation of 135 closed-circuit television cameras at Bronx River Houses. The city subsequently reported a 44 percent decrease in crime at the development from January through October 2000 compared with the same period in 1999.

== Notable residents ==
- Afrika Bambaataa (1957–2026), disc jockey, rapper, songwriter and producer
- Darren Carrington (born 1966), NFL football player
- Judy Craig (born 1946), lead singer of the doo-wop group The Chiffons, James Monroe High School graduate
- Ronnie Mack (1940–1963), songwriter best known for writing The Chiffons number-one hit "He's So Fine"
- Jazzy Jay (born 1961), hip-hop DJ and producer
- Wilfredo "Bio" Feliciano, graffiti artist and member of TATS CRU.

== See also ==
- New York City Housing Authority
