= Clason Point, Bronx =

Neighborhood in New York City

Clason Point
- Neighborhood of the Bronx
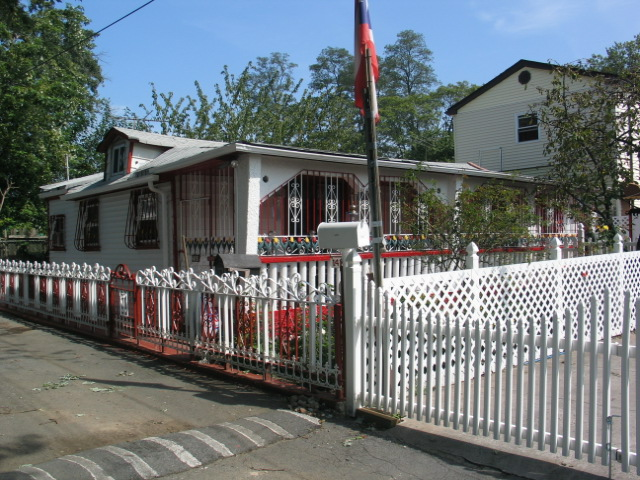
- Houses in Harding Park at Clason Point's extreme southern tip
- Interactive map of Clason Point
- Coordinates: 40.806°N 73.85°W
- Country: United States
- State: New York
- City: New York City
- Borough: Bronx
- Community District: Bronx 9

Area
  - Total: 0.47 sq mi (1.2 km^{2})

Population (2010)
  - Total: 9,136
  - Density: 19,000/sq mi (7,500/km^{2})

Economics
  - Median income: $65,176
- ZIP Codes: 10473
- Area code: 718, 347, 929, and 917
- Website: www.clasonpoint.nyc

Clason Point is a peninsula and a neighborhood in the East Bronx, New York City. The area includes a collection of neighborhoods including Harding Park, and Soundview. Its boundaries, starting from the north and moving clockwise, are: Lafayette Avenue to the north, White Plains Road/Pugsley Creek Park to the east, the East River to the south, and the Bronx River to the west.

Soundview Avenue is the primary thoroughfare through Clason Point. Soundview Avenue once stretched from White Plains Road and O'Brien Avenue in Harding Park to Westchester and Metcalf Avenues in Soundview-Bruckner before the construction of the Bronx River Parkway. It was then known as Clason's Point Road. The Bruckner Expressway which now bisects the area along the center was once known as Ludlow Avenue.

Clason Point is part of Bronx Community Board 9, and its ZIP Code include 10473. The area is patrolled by the NYPD's 43rd Precinct. NYCHA property in the area is patrolled by PSA 8 at 2794 Randall Avenue in the Throggs Neck section of the Bronx.

== History ==
=== Precolonial and colonial times ===
The small peninsula of the Bronx defined by the Bronx River, Pugsley's Creek, and the East River is known as Clason (pronounced CLAW-son) Point. However, it has had several names over the years. In ancient times, the Bronx River area to the West was known to the Siwanoys, who spoke Algonquian, as "Aquahung". The site of a large Native American settlement, comprising more than seventy dwellings, Clason Point was then known to natives as "Snakapins", or "Land By The Two Waters".

Europeans began settling the region in the early 17th century, and the Cornell family built the first permanent European settlement in the spit of land first known as Snakipins by the Indians. An English settler, Thomas Cornell, began farming here from 1643, for which the area became known as Cornell's Neck. He owned 2000 acres. During the Pig Wars the Indigenous People burned his farm and he narrowly escaped by boat. In the 1640s a series of skirmishes between the Cornells and the Siwanoy, known as the Pig Wars, were led by Chief Wampage, the Siwanoy sachem believed to be the Indigenous leader who killed Anne Hutchinson and her children in 1643 at Split Rock, now in the northern Bronx. A passing ship rescued the Cornells, and they returned to their home the year after Wampage's last raid. Britisher Thomas Pell arrived at a treaty in 1654 with several Siwanoy sachems, including Wampage, that the Dutch authorities didn't recognize. This disagreement was rendered moot in 1664 when the British fleet appeared in the harbor and the Dutch capitulated.

=== Resort area ===
Site of the Clason Point Point Military Academy (Note: Clason's Point Road was renamed as Soundview Avenue.)

The area was then renamed Clason Point after Isaac Clason, a Scottish merchant and a major land owner. Development in the 19th century soon attracted resort seekers, and the area became known for its amusements and entertainment. From 1883 to 1927, it was the site of the Clason Point Military Academy.

By the middle 19th century Clason Point had many farmhouses, despite its poor drainage. Even today the main shopping area is fairly distant, along Story Avenue, the Bruckner Expressway and White Plains Road. Its seaside location and views attracted seaside resorts, dancehalls and amusement parks in the early 20th century, served by a ferry from College Point, Queens. Kane's, a major saloon in the Clason Point area in the 1920s, featured Helen Kane, a singer who coined the phrase "Boop-oop-a-doop" and for which cartoon flapper Betty Boop was modeled. Baby Esther was a black woman who originally performed at the Cotton Club in Harlem and was actually the first flapper with the Betty Boop persona, but Helen Kane was falsely credited at the time.

Clason Point in the early 20th century was an era of trolley cars on the main thoroughfare, Soundview Avenue or, as it was then, Clason Point Road. Clason Point was a mixture of mansions, farmland and undeveloped fields and swampland. There were ferryboat and steamer excursions from "The Point" to downtown Manhattan as well as local service across the East River to College Point, Queens. The last boat to College Point terminated during World War II. Fairyland Park, in the Harding Park area of Clason Point, contained dance halls, roller coasters, picnic groves and baseball games, as well as a 300-by-50-foot (91 by 15 m) saltwater outdoor swimming pool known as "The Inkwell". There was a volunteer fire department, a small airport, docks for sailboats and motorboats, saloons, and novelty shops. The amusement park rides and novelties was then known as "The Coney Island of the Bronx". The Ferris wheel in the amusement park was blown over in a 1922 windstorm, killing at least seven.

=== Residential development ===
The resort area started to decline during the 1930s, with the onset of the Great Depression and the construction of the IRT Pelham Line. Permanent residence increased in the area. Some residents converted existing bungalows around Harding Park for year-round occupation. After World War II, urban planner Robert Moses targeted the community for slum clearance, including the construction of public housing. His proposal was defeated by local residents. White flight occurred in the area through the mid-20th century.

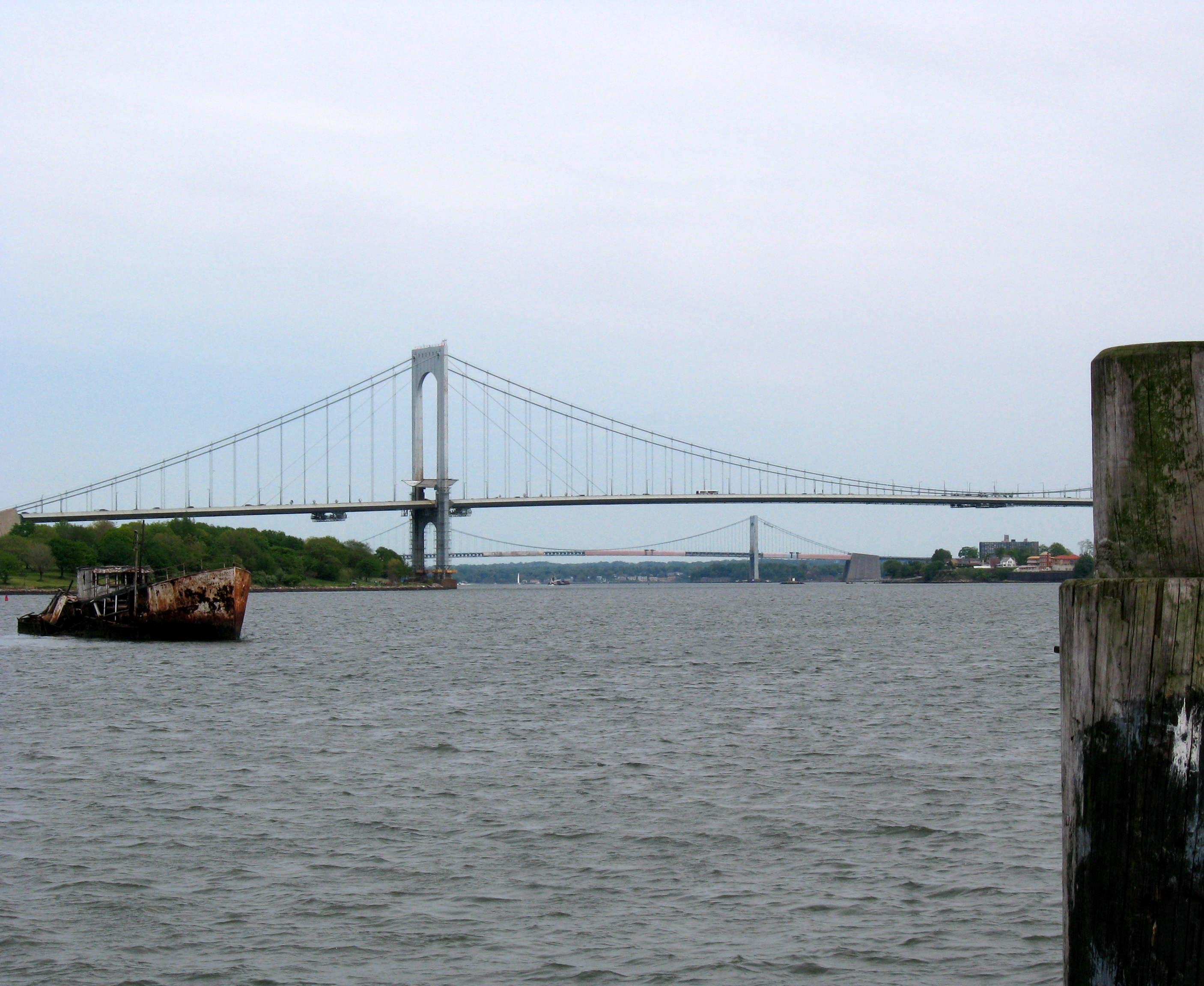
Looking east on an early afternoon from Clason Point Park

The former amusement park, purchased in 1947, became the site for the Shorehaven Beach Club two years later. The club was purchased by Soundview Associates, an investment group including Sylvester Stallone, in 1986. It became the Shorehaven Condominiums in 1999, a gated community of 1,183 multi-unit condominium townhomes. Development on most of the remaining vacant parcels in the area continued through the 2000s.

Soundview Park, one of the largest in the South Bronx, was renovated to include pedestrian access and redesigned recreational areas. Future plans in accordance with PlaNYC initiatives will create an urban oasis in this dense community; complete with recreation nodes, Greenway connections, bike/hike trails, designated fishing areas, a boat launch, and esplanades with skyline views. The neighborhood has become increasingly more diverse with a rise in varied Latin American immigration in the 21st century. Crime has also seen a significant decline as a result of a number of factors including enhanced policing techniques and changing economic demographics.

In the 21st century, the Harding Park section of Clason Point became known as Little Puerto Rico, with narrow streets and bungalow homes along the waterfront. The infrastructure of the area has not been updated in many years. Many streets flood after periods of heavy rain. The nearest retail strip is almost a mile away. Public transportation consists of two bus routes and there are only a few schools in the neighborhood.

== Demographics ==
Based on data from the 2010 United States census, the population of Soundview/Clason Point/Castle Hill was 53,686, a change of 2,933 (5.5%) from the 50,753 counted in 2000. Covering an area of 1,198.36 acres (484.96 ha), the neighborhood had a population density of 44.8 inhabitants per acre (28,700/sq mi; 11,100/km^{2}). The racial makeup of the neighborhood was 2% (1,067) White, 37% (19,876) African American, 0.3% (161) Native American, 1.3% (709) Asian, 0% (22) Pacific Islander, 0.4% (239) from other races, and 1.1% (586) from two or more races. Hispanic or Latino of any race were 57.8% (31,026) of the population.

Soundview's total land area is roughly 1.3 square miles. It is racially diverse and has a mixture of moderate single family homes, low income buildings and expensive condominiums. Most buildings in this section have the same requirements as buildings in Co-op City.

The entirety of Community District 9, which comprises Clason Point and Parkchester, had 184,105 inhabitants as of NYC Health's 2018 Community Health Profile, with an average life expectancy of 79.7 years. This is about the same as the median life expectancy of 81.2 for all New York City neighborhoods. Most inhabitants are youth and middle-aged adults: 25% are between the ages of between 0–17, 29% between 25 and 44, and 24% between 45 and 64. The ratio of college-aged and elderly residents was lower, at 10% and 12% respectively.

As of 2017, the median household income in Community District 9 was $40,005. In 2018, an estimated 26% of Clason Point and Parkchester residents lived in poverty, compared to 25% in all of the Bronx and 20% in all of New York City. One in eight residents (13%) were unemployed, compared to 13% in the Bronx and 9% in New York City. Rent burden, or the percentage of residents who have difficulty paying their rent, is 55% in Clason Point and Parkchester, compared to the boroughwide and citywide rates of 58% and 51% respectively. Based on this calculation, as of 2018, Clason Point and Parkchester are considered low-income relative to the rest of the city and not gentrifying.

== Land use and terrain ==
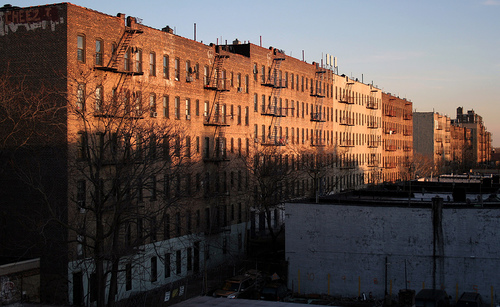
Tenements

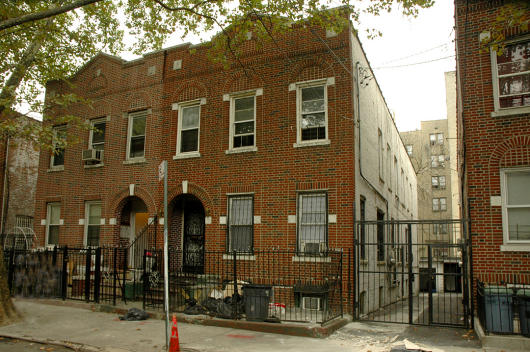
Semi-detached multi-unit rowhouses

There are large, residential housing complexes of various types. These include public housing, high-rise co-ops and rentals. The neighborhood contains one of the highest concentrations of NYCHA projects in the Bronx. There are also 5 and 6 story, pre-war, apartment buildings primarily concentrated along the IRT Pelham Line El on Westchester Avenue and multi-unit row-houses located throughout the neighborhood. Starting in the 1990s, the construction of modern 2 and 3 unit row-houses and apartment buildings have increased the percentage of owners versus renters. The neighborhood's northern and eastern borders have a heavy concentration of commercial establishments. Westchester Avenue evolved into a mixed use, primarily commercial, district serving the greater area after the completion of the elevated IRT Pelham Line. Bruckner Plaza, which greatly expanded throughout the 1990s, contains big box stores. Other primary thoroughfares contain limited but necessary amenities like supermarkets, pharmacies, barbershops, hair salons, fast food, bodegas, and cheap shops.

Bronx River is largely industrial in usage.

There are several NYCHA developments:

1. 1780 Watson Avenue, one 6-story building.
2. 1471 Watson Avenue; one 6-story building.
3. Boynton Avenue Rehab; three rehabilitated tenement buildings, either 3 or 6 stories tall.
4. Sotomayor Houses; twenty-eight 7-story buildings.
5. Bronx River Houses; nine 14-story buildings.
6. Bronx River Addition; two buildings, one 6 stories tall another 14 stories tall.
7. Clason Point Gardens; forty-five buildings, all 2 stories tall. This was the first New York City Housing Authority development in the Bronx.
8. Monroe Houses; twelve buildings, either 8, 14, or 15 stories tall.
9. Sack Wern Houses; seven buildings, each 6 stories tall.
10. Soundview Houses; thirteen 7-story buildings.

== Parks and recreation ==
Soundview Park occupies 205 acres (83 ha) in the southwestern section of the neighborhood, with ballfields and playgrounds and a pedestrian/bike greenway along the left bank of the Bronx River estuary from Lafayette Avenue to Leland Avenue. It was built on filled land starting in 1939. The first 93 acres (38 ha) of the park were acquired by the City of New York in 1937, and 66 acres (27 ha) more were acquired along the water's edge in December 1939.

Pugsley Creek Park is located along the eastern shoreline of Clason Point. It surrounds a historic creek that was previously a tributary of Westchester Creek.

Clason Point Park is located on the southern shoreline of Clason Point. It was historically the site of an amusement park, which operated in the first half of the 20th century. The park now serves as a ferry landing and kayaking facility.

== Subsections ==
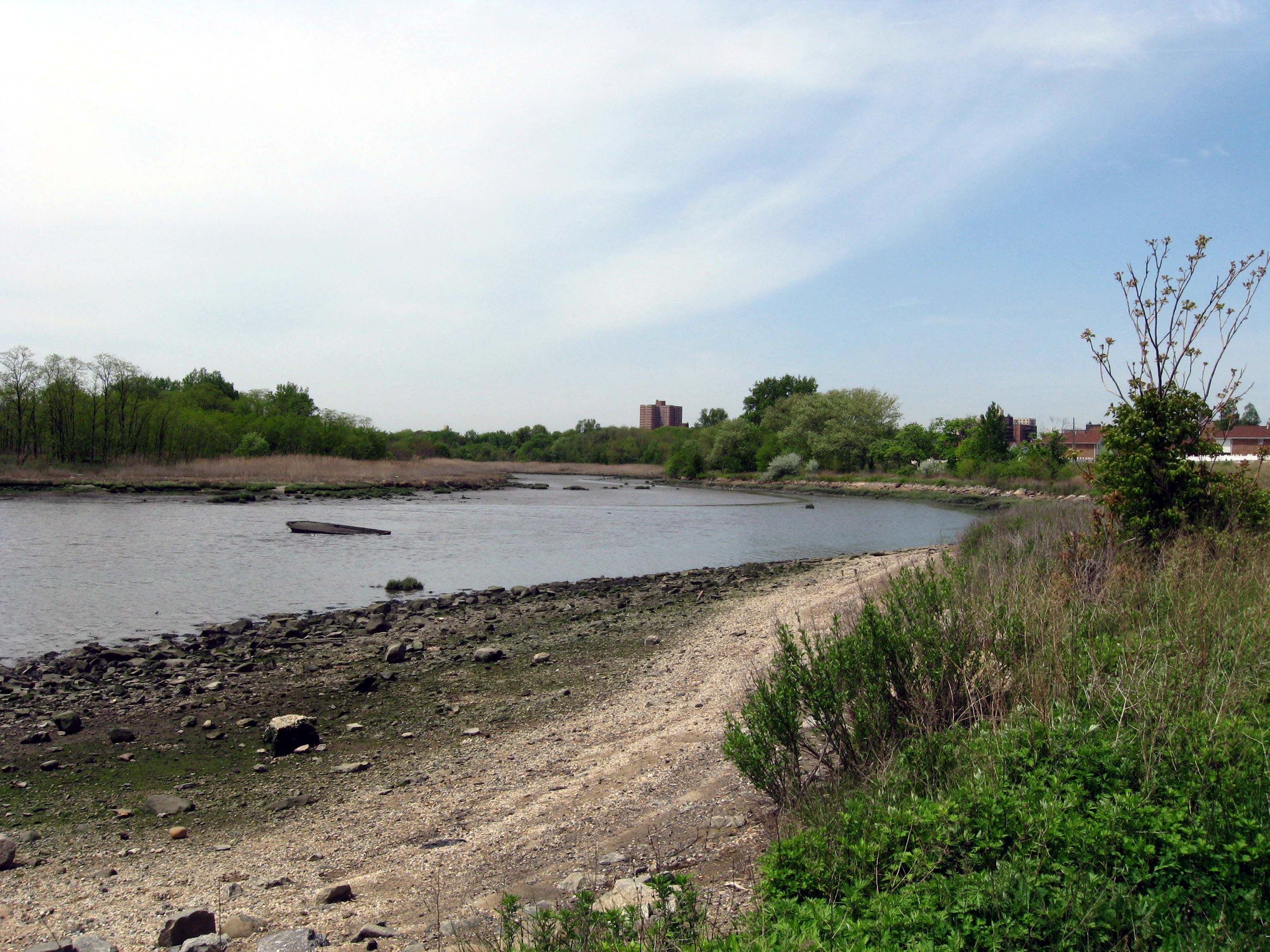
Pugsley Creek Park separates Castle Hill Neck (right) from Clason Point (left)

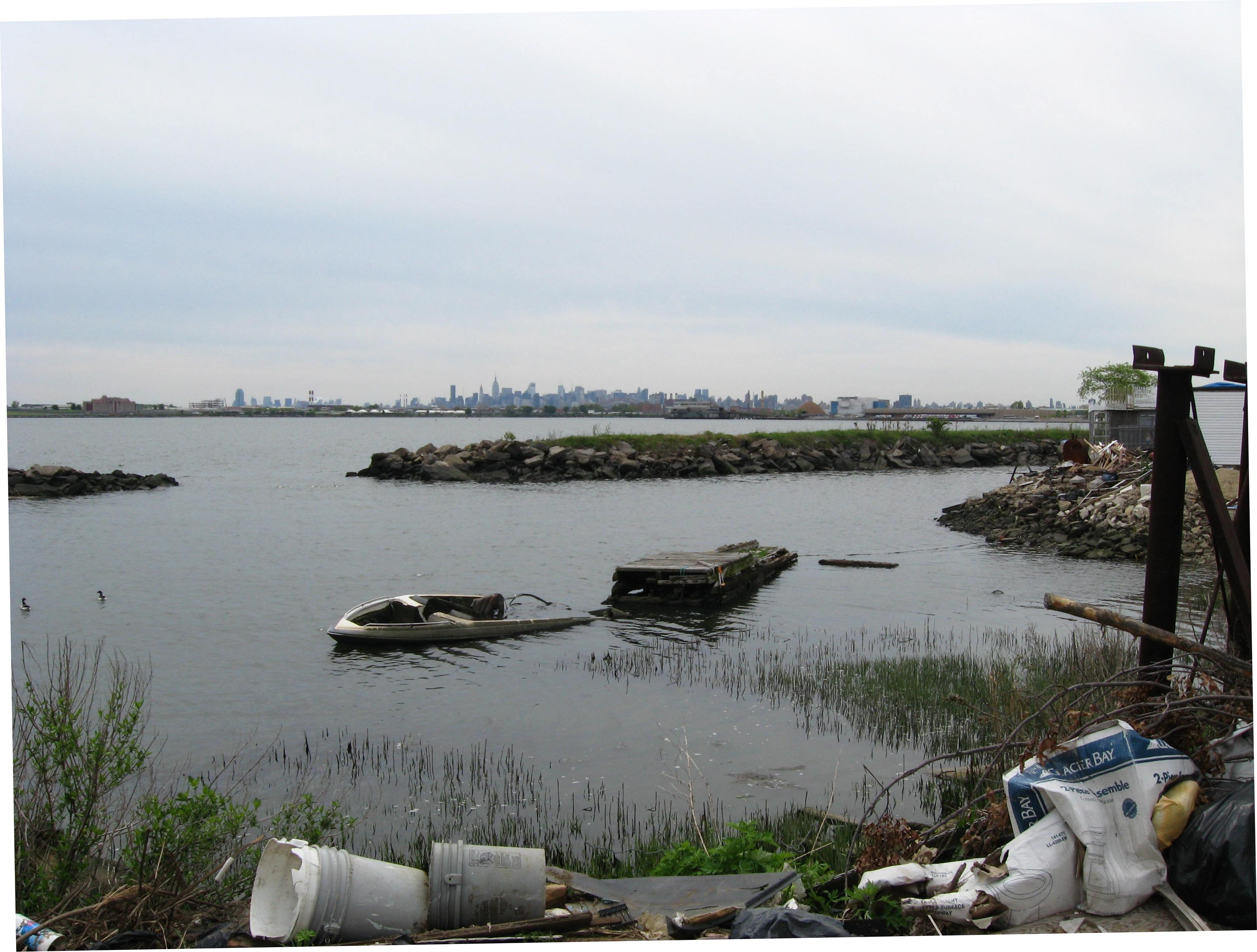
An artificial Lagoon at the south end of Soundview Park

- Bronx River: Bronx River's boundaries, starting from the north and moving clockwise are: The Cross-Bronx Expressway to the north, White Plains Road to the east, Westchester Avenue to the south, and the Bronx River to the west. Bronx River includes the Bronx River Houses. The area is usually included in the Soundview section.
- Harding Park: Harding Park's boundaries, starting from the north and moving clockwise are: Lacombe Avenue to the north, Pugsley's Creek to the east, the East River to the south, and the Bronx River to the west. Harding Park is composed mostly of bungalows set away from the street grid. The area is also referred to as the subsection of Clason Point. As in Silver Beach and Edgewater Park in Throggs Neck, a peninsular location and irregular street grid incongruent with the main Bronx grid lend an air of isolation.
- Soundview-Bruckner: Soundview-Bruckner's boundaries, starting from the north and moving clockwise are: Westchester Avenue to the north, White Plains Road to the east, the Bruckner Expressway to the south, and the Bronx River to the west. Soundview-Bruckner includes the Bronxdale Houses. The area is usually included in the Soundview section.
- Soundview: Soundview's boundaries, starting from the north and moving clockwise are: the Bruckner Expressway to the north, White Plains Road to the east, Lacombe Avenue to the south, and the Bronx River to the west. Soundview includes Soundview Park as well as multiple low-income public housing developments.

== Police and crime ==
Clason Point and Parkchester are patrolled by the 43rd Precinct of the NYPD, located at 900 Fteley Avenue. The 43rd Precinct ranked 36th safest out of 69 patrol areas for per-capita crime in 2010. As of 2018, with a non-fatal assault rate of 100 per 100,000 people, Clason Point and Parkchester's rate of violent crimes per capita is more than that of the city as a whole. The incarceration rate of 603 per 100,000 people is higher than that of the city as a whole.

The 43rd Precinct has a lower crime rate than in the 1990s, with crimes across all categories having decreased by 63.1% between 1990 and 2022. The precinct reported 6 murders, 48 rapes, 747 robberies, 806 felony assaults, 302 burglaries, 1,039 grand larcenies, and 561 grand larcenies auto in 2022.

== Fire safety ==
Clason Point contains a New York City Fire Department (FDNY) fire station, Engine Co. 96/Ladder Co. 54, at 1689 Story Avenue.

== Health ==
As of 2018, preterm births and births to teenage mothers are more common in Clason Point and Parkchester than in other places citywide. In Clason Point and Parkchester, there were 106 preterm births per 1,000 live births (compared to 87 per 1,000 citywide), and 26.4 births to teenage mothers per 1,000 live births (compared to 19.3 per 1,000 citywide). Clason Point and Parkchester has a relatively average population of residents who are uninsured. In 2018, this population of uninsured residents was estimated to be 16%, higher than the citywide rate of 14%.

The concentration of fine particulate matter, the deadliest type of air pollutant, in Clason Point and Parkchester is 0.0076 milligrams per cubic metre (7.6×10^{−9} oz/ft^{3}), more than the city average. Eighteen percent of Clason Point and Parkchester residents are smokers, which is higher than the city average of 14% of residents being smokers. In Clason Point and Parkchester, 32% of residents are obese, 16% are diabetic, and 34% have high blood pressure—compared to the citywide averages of 24%, 11%, and 28% respectively. In addition, 25% of children are obese, compared to the citywide average of 20%.

Eighty-three percent of residents eat some fruits and vegetables every day, which is less than the city's average of 87%. In 2018, 72% of residents described their health as "good", "very good", or "excellent", lower than the city's average of 78%. For every supermarket in Clason Point and Parkchester, there are 13 bodegas.

The nearest hospital campuses are Montefiore Medical Center's Westchester Square and West Farms campuses, as well as Bronx-Lebanon Hospital Center's Longwood campus. The nearest large hospital is NYC Health + Hospitals/Jacobi in Morris Park.

== Post offices and ZIP Codes ==
Clason Point is located within two ZIP Codes. The area north of Bruckner Expressway/Interstate 278 is in 10472, while the area south of Bruckner Expressway/I-278 is in 10473. The United States Postal Service operates three post offices nearby:

- Clason Point Station – 829 Soundview Avenue
- Cornell Station – 1950 Lafayette Avenue
- Soundview Station – 1687 Gleason Avenue

== Education ==
Clason Point and Parkchester generally have a similar rate of college-educated residents to the rest of the city as of 2018. While 23% of residents age 25 and older have a college education or higher, 30% have less than a high school education and 47% are high school graduates or have some college education. By contrast, 26% of Bronx residents and 43% of city residents have a college education or higher. The percentage of Clason Point and Parkchester students excelling in math rose from 23% in 2000 to 44% in 2011, and reading achievement increased from 27% to 30% during the same time period.

Clason Point and Parkchester's rate of elementary school student absenteeism is higher than the rest of New York City. In Clason Point and Parkchester, 28% of elementary school students missed twenty or more days per school year, more than the citywide average of 20%. Additionally, 69% of high school students in Clason Point and Parkchester graduate on time, lower than the citywide average of 75%.

=== Schools ===
The following public schools are located in Clason Point that are not also located in Soundview:

- The Bronx Mathematics Preparatory School (grades 6–8)
- Archimedes Academy for Math Science and Technology Applications (grades 6–12)
- Women's Academy of Excellence (grades 6–12)

=== Libraries ===
The New York Public Library (NYPL) operates three branches near Clason Point.

- The Clason's Point branch in the Soundview area, is located at 1215 Morrison Avenue. The branch opened in 1952 and moved to its current location in 1971.
- The Castle Hill branch is located at 947 Castle Hill Avenue. The branch opened in 1963 and moved to its current location in 1981.
- The Soundview branch is located at 660 Soundview Avenue. The branch opened at this location in 1973.

== Transportation ==
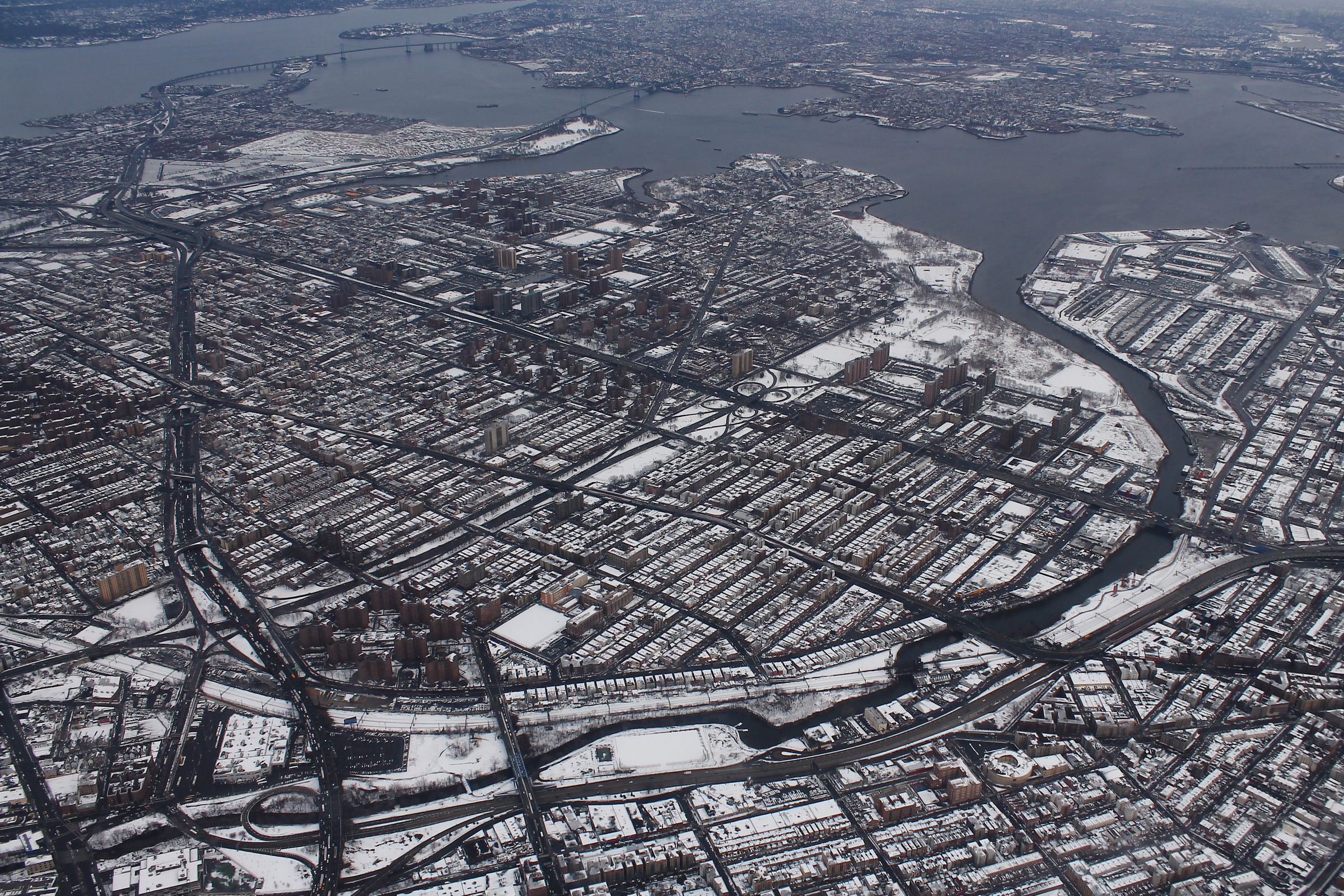
Aerial view of The Bronx which includes on Clason Point/Soundview.

The local New York City Subway line is the IRT Pelham Line (6 and <6> trains), operating along Westchester Avenue.

The following MTA Regional Bus Operations bus routes serve Clason Point:

- Bx27: to Simpson Street (via Rosedale Av)
- Bx39: to Wakefield–241st Street (via White Plains Rd)

Nonprofit group Metropolitan Waterfront Alliance had been bolstering support to expand ferry service into the Bronx. In 2015, Mayor Bill de Blasio announced that in 2018, ferry service would begin operating in the neighborhood. NYC Ferry's Soundview route started serving Clason Point on August 15, 2018.
