= Judy Craig =

American singer

Judy Craig (born August 6, 1946) is the lead singer of the American girl group, The Chiffons. She left the group in 1969, but returned in 1992 after the death of Barbara Lee. Fronted by Judy Craig Mann along with her daughter and niece, The Chiffons resurfaced in 2009 and continue to tour and perform in North America and Europe.

== Early life ==
Craig is a native of The Bronx, New York and raised in Soundview, Bronx. She was a senior in high school when "He's So Fine" hit. Craig attended James Monroe High School.
