= Westchester Square Medical Center =

Defunct Bronx hospital

- Montefiore Health System
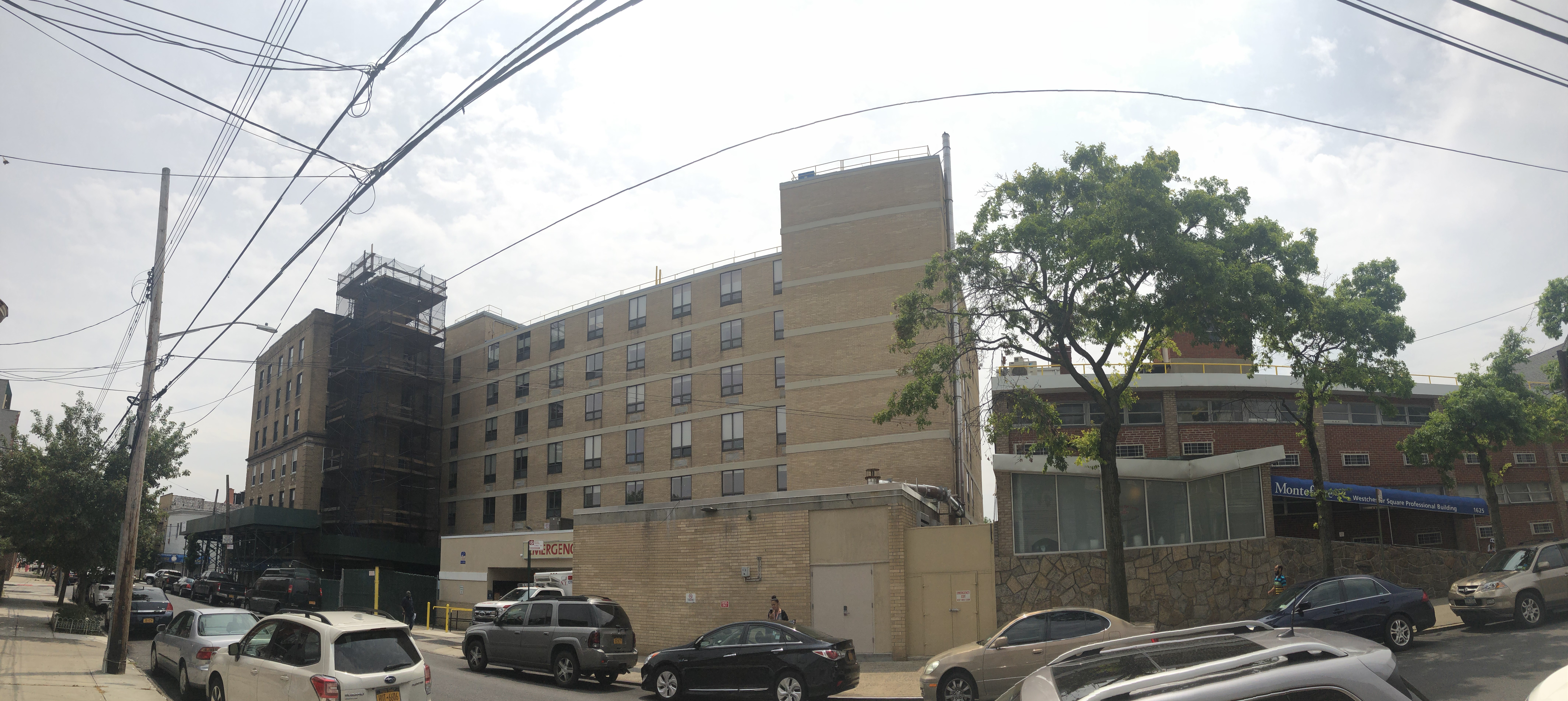

Geography
- Location: Westchester Square, The Bronx, New York, United States
- Coordinates: 40°50′27″N 73°50′54″W

Organization
- Care system: Private
- Type: General

Services
- Emergency department: Yes

History
- Former name: Westchester Square Hospital
- Opened: 1930
- Closed: 2013 (as Westchester Square Hospital)

Links
- Lists: Hospitals in New York State
- Other links: Hospitals in the Bronx

Westchester Square Medical Center, located in Westchester Square, opened in 1930 as Westchester Square Hospital (which closed in 2013), and currently houses an emergency room, operating rooms, and offices for Montefiore Medical Center.

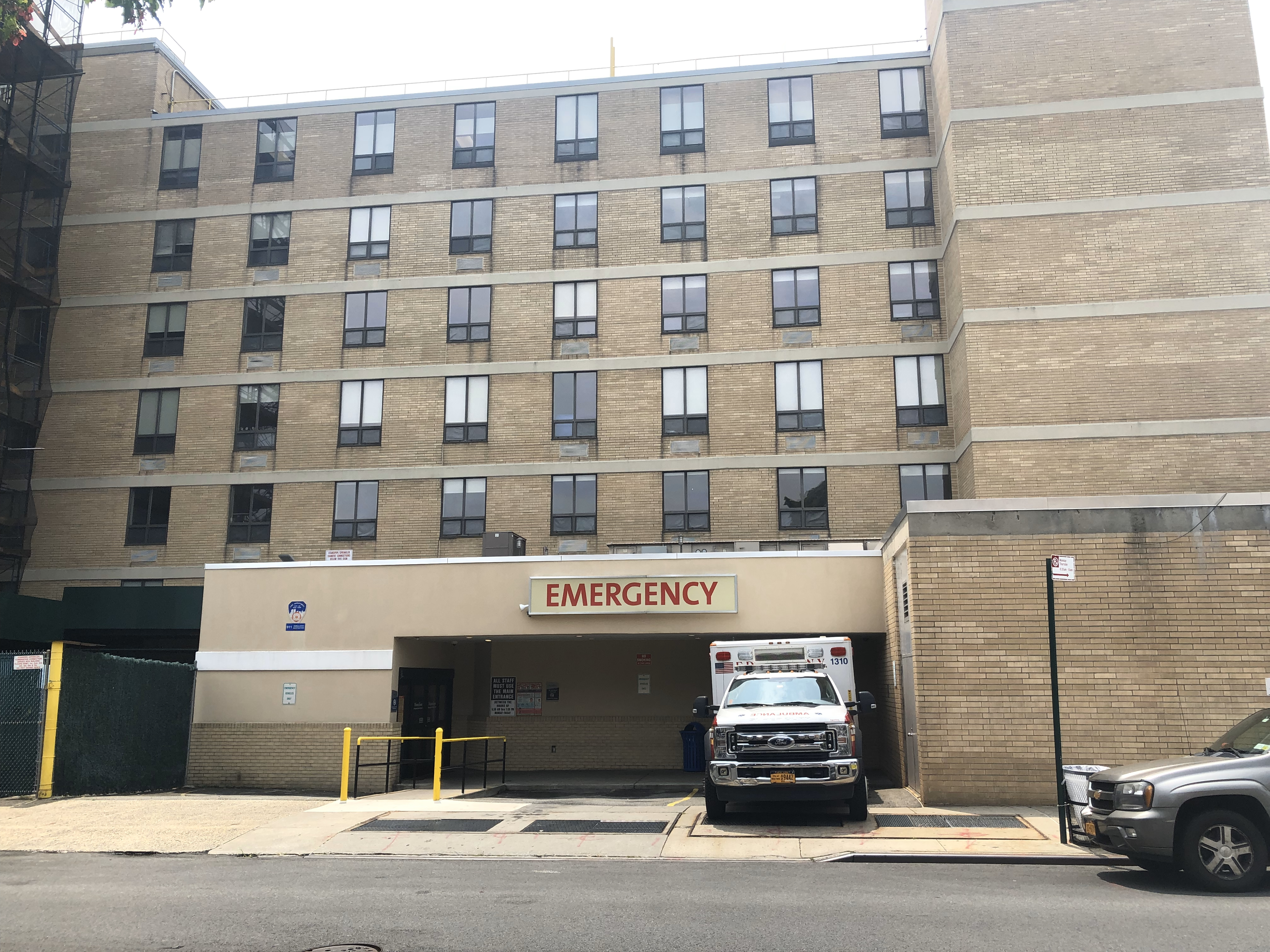
Westchester Square Medical Center emergency department ambulance bay.

== History ==
Government attempts in 2006 and again in 2009 to close the hospital were forestalled. When Westchester Square did close in 2013, Montefiore Medical Center gained control of the building "and converted it to an ambulatory care center."

The hospital's offerings, even prior to its renaming as Westchester Square Medical Center, included general medical/surgical and maternity services. Subsequent to Montefiore's 2013 takeover of the facility, it was renamed Westchester Square Campus-Montefiore Medical Center.
