= Amanda Farías =

American politician (born 1989)

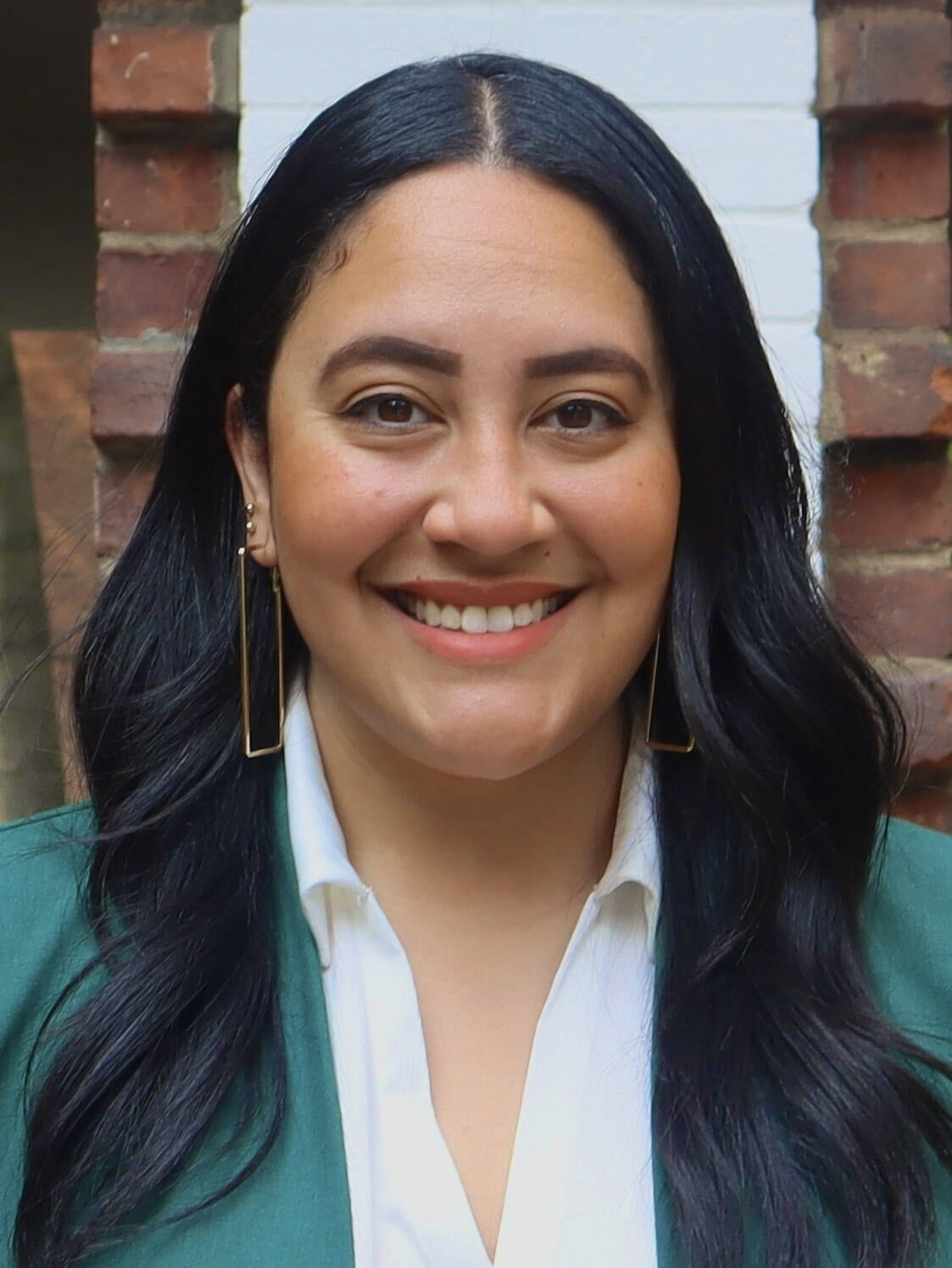

Majority Leader of the New York City Council
- In office January 3, 2024 – January 15, 2025
- Preceded by: Keith Powers
- Succeeded by: Shaun Abreu

Member of the New York City Council from the 18th district
- Incumbent
- Assumed office January 1, 2022
- Preceded by: Rubén Díaz Sr.

Personal details
- Born: July 9, 1989 (age 37)
- Party: Democratic
- Education: St. John's University, New York (BA, MA)
- Website: Official website

Amanda C. Farías (born July 9, 1989) is an American politician from New York City. She is the Democratic City Council Member for the 18th district of the New York City Council, which covers Soundview, Parkchester, and Castle Hill in the Bronx. She was appointed by Speaker Adrienne Adams to be Majority Leader of the New York City Council on January 3, 2024. She is Chair of the Committee on Economic Development, and sits as a member on the following committees: transportation, finance, sanitation, consumer and worker protection, cultural and intergroup relations, and Co-Chair of the Women’s Caucus, and a member of the Black, Latino and Asian Caucus and Progressive Caucus. In 2024, she became the first Latina to hold the position of majority leader in the city council.

== Early life ==
Farías was born in Soundview in the Bronx to Dominican and Puerto Rican parents. She graduated from Preston High School in 2007, and went on to receive both her undergraduate and master's degree in political science from St. John's University in 2011 and 2012, respectively.

Post-graduation, Farías worked briefly for Barack Obama's re-election campaign before joining the staff of Councilwoman Elizabeth Crowley of Queens, where she remained until her own bid for the City Council.

== Political career ==
=== 2017 City Council campaign ===
In 2017, Farías ran for the 18th district of the New York City Council, which was held by term-limited Democrat Annabel Palma. Farías was one of several candidates in the Democratic primary aiming to defeat Rubén Díaz Sr., a longtime conservative and controversial state senator with the support of the Bronx Democratic Party apparatus.

Despite Farías' endorsements from some sitting councilmembers and other groups aiming to prevent a Díaz victory, her campaign felt it would be difficult to win against the well-connected and well-funded Díaz. On election night in September, Díaz emerged victorious with 42 percent of the vote; Farías received 21 percent, and three other candidates running to Díaz's left took the remainder.

=== Inter-Council years ===
Fresh off her loss for City Council, Farías successfully ran for Democratic state committee, defeating a 21-year incumbent in the process. She also worked for a series of activist and nonprofit organizations, including New American Leaders, Riders Alliance, Women of Color for Progress, and the Consortium for Worker Education.

=== 2021 City Council campaign ===
Early in 2019, Farías announced that she would seek a rematch against Díaz, now an incumbent. However, Díaz surprised observers in July 2020 when, after an unsuccessful bid for Congress, he announced he would not seek re-election to a second term on the City Council.

Now running for an open seat, Farías was able to consolidate support to a far greater extent than in 2017. The Bronx Democratic Party, which had supported Díaz four years earlier, endorsed Farías, as did Congressman Ritchie Torres and most other local elected officials. Her main opponent in the primary was Bronx Community Board 9 district manager William Rivera, who had the support of Bronx Borough President Rubén Díaz Jr. and the incumbent, and who came under fire for seemingly diverting thousands of the board's dollars to his own nonprofit.

Farías topped the eight-candidate field on election night with 27 percent of the vote; after absentee ballots and ranked-choice votes were counted, she defeated Rivera 52-48%, and formally declared victory on July 7. She later won the general election by a wide margin and took office on January 1, 2022.

== Personal life ==
Farías was born and raised in Soundview. Currently resides in the surrounding Parkchester community. She identifies as an Afro-Latina and is Catholic.

== Electoral history ==
=== 2025 ===
2025 New York City Council election, District 18
| Party | Candidate | Votes | % |
|---|---|---|---|
| Democratic | Amanda Farías | 21,975 | 79.1 |
| Working Families | Amanda Farías | 2,476 | 8.9 |
| Total | Amanda Farías (incumbent) | 24,451 | 88.0 |
| Republican | Shuvonkar Saha | 2,401 | 8.6 |
| Conservative | Zenobia Merced Bonilla | 582 | 2.1 |
| United Alliance | Wilfredo Hierrezuelo | 289 | 1.0 |
| Write-in | | 65 | 0.2 |
| Total votes | | 27,788 | 100.0 |
| Democratic hold | | | |

=== 2023 ===
2023 New York City Council election, District 18
| Party | Candidate | Votes | % |
|---|---|---|---|
| Democratic | Amanda Farías | 5,648 | 82.5 |
| Working Families | Amanda Farías | 362 | 5.3 |
| Total | Amanda Farías (incumbent) | 6,010 | 87.8 |
| Republican | Michelle Castillo | 775 | 11.3 |
| Write-in | | 60 | 0.9 |
| Total votes | | 6,845 | 100.0 |
| Democratic hold | | | |

=== 2021 ===
2021 New York City Council Democratic primary, District 18
| Party | Candidate | Maximum round | Maximum votes | Share in maximum round | Maximum votes First round votes Transfer votes |
|---|---|---|---|---|---|
| Democratic | Amanda Farías | 6 | 6,004 | 52.3% | |
| Democratic | William Rivera | 6 | 5,467 | 47.7% | |
| Democratic | Michael Beltzer | 5 | 2,079 | 16.2% | |
| Democratic | Darlene Jackson | 5 | 1,964 | 15.3% | |
| Democratic | Mohammed Mujumder | 4 | 1,768 | 13.1% | |
| Democratic | Mirza M. Rashid | 3 | 732 | 5.3% | |
| Democratic | William Russell Moore | 2 | 577 | 4.1% | |
| Democratic | Eliu A. Lara | 2 | 136 | 1.0% | |
| Write-In | | 1 | 70 | 0.5% | |

2021 New York City Council election, District 18
| Party | Candidate | Votes | % |
|---|---|---|---|
| Democratic | Amanda Farías | 10,312 | 86.7 |
| Republican | Lamont L. Paul | 1,559 | 13.1 |
| Write-in | | 25 | 0.2 |
| Total votes | | 11,896 | 100.0 |
| Democratic hold | | | |

=== 2017 ===
2017 New York City Council Democratic primary, District 18
| Party | Candidate | Votes | % |
|---|---|---|---|
| Democratic | Rubén Díaz Sr. | 4,017 | 42.1 |
| Democratic | Amanda Farías | 1,991 | 20.9 |
| Democratic | Elvin Garcia | 1,397 | 14.6 |
| Democratic | Michael Beltzer | 1,282 | 13.4 |
| Democratic | William Russell Moore | 842 | 8.8 |
| Write-in | | 8 | 0.1 |
| Total votes | | 9,537 | 100.0 |

Political offices
| Preceded by Keith Powers | Majority Leader of the New York City Council; 2024–2025 | Succeeded by Shaun Abreu |
