= Pedro Espada Jr. =

American politician (born 1953)

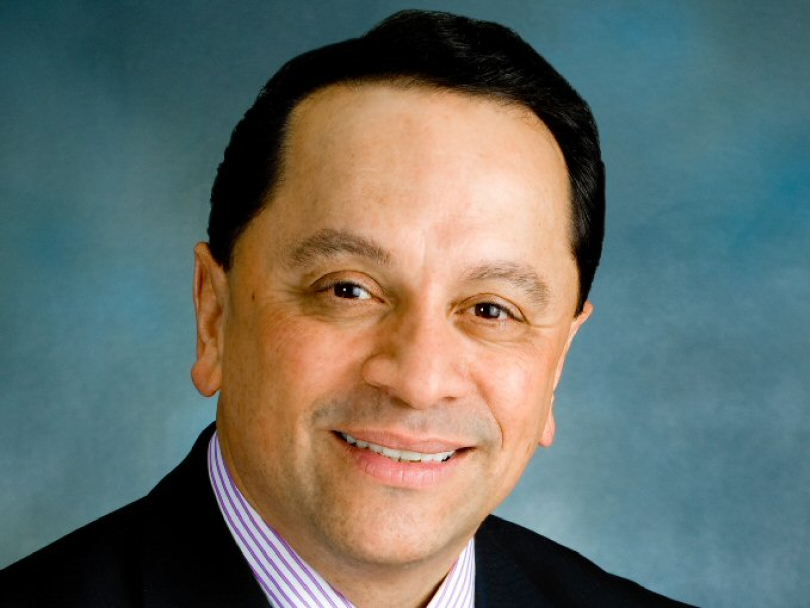

Acting Lieutenant Governor of New York
- In office June 8, 2009 – July 8, 2009
- Governor: David Paterson
- Preceded by: Malcolm Smith (acting)
- Succeeded by: Richard Ravitch

Temporary President and Majority Leader of the New York State Senate
- In office July 9, 2009 – December 14, 2010
- Preceded by: Malcolm Smith/Dean Skelos (Note: During the 2009 New York State Senate leadership crisis, both Smith and Skelos claimed to be Majority Leader.)
- Succeeded by: Dean Skelos

Member of the New York State Senate
- In office 2009–2011
- Preceded by: Efrain Gonzalez
- Succeeded by: Gustavo Rivera
- Constituency: 33rd district
- In office 2001–2002
- Preceded by: David Rosado
- Succeeded by: Rubén Díaz Sr.
- Constituency: 32nd district
- In office 1993–1996
- Preceded by: Efrain Gonzalez
- Succeeded by: David Rosado
- Constituency: 32nd district

Personal details
- Born: October 20, 1953 (age 73) Coamo, Puerto Rico
- Party: Democratic
- Spouse: Connie Espada
- Education: Fordham University (BA)

Pedro Espada Jr. (born October 20, 1953) is an American former politician and convicted felon from the state of New York. A Democrat, Espada served in the New York State Senate from 1993 to 1996, from 2001 to 2002, and again from 2009 to 2011.

Espada was at the center of a June 2009 power struggle in the State Senate. He was one of two Democratic senators who voted to appoint Republican Dean Skelos as Majority Leader. After his return to the Democratic caucus on July 9, 2009, Espada was chosen as Senate Majority Leader; he is the first Hispanic to have held that post. Dogged by scandals, he was defeated by Gustavo Rivera in a September 2010 primary election.

On December 14, 2010, Espada was indicted on six federal counts of embezzlement and theft; he was stripped of his leadership position in the State Senate the same day and left office in January 2011. Espada was convicted on federal corruption charges in May 2012 and was sentenced to five years in prison.

== Early life and career ==
Espada was born in Coamo, Puerto Rico in 1953 and moved with his family to New York City at the age of five. His family settled in the Mott Haven section of the Bronx, where he attended the New York City Public Schools. He attended Fordham University, and graduated in 1975 with a Bachelor of Arts degree. Espada subsequently took graduate level coursework at the Hunter College School of Social Work, received graduate training certificates from open enrollment programs at the Wharton School of the University of Pennsylvania and from the Columbia Mailman School of Public Health, and received certification in 1990 from the Real Estate Institute at NYU's School of Continuing and Professional Studies.

In the late 1970s, Espada was a community organizer and educator in Harlem and the Lower East Side in Manhattan, and in the South Bronx. He established and served as president of the Comprehensive Community Development Corporation and was the executive director of the Soundview Health Center.

Espada had become head of the tenant's association at Stevenson Commons and led the effort in 1978 to open what became the Soundview Health Center after the city's economic problems led to a decision to not establish a promised clinic in the complex. The empty building that was to have been the clinic was leased by the group and $50,000 in federal grants was obtained, with the first patient taken in October 1981. By 1992, Soundview was offering medical and preventive care to 45,000 patients annually, and was also running a computer literacy program, serving lunch to hundreds of seniors daily and distributing surplus food. The New York Times noted that the health center featured Espada's name and image throughout the facility, describing it as having "elements of a cult of personality"; Espada explained, "the community has to know you" so that "in the end, they will trust you".

== Political career ==
In 1988, Espada ran in the Democratic primary for the nomination in New York's 18th congressional district, which at the time covered the largely Hispanic and African American heart of the South Bronx, against incumbent Robert García. Espada, mounting a challenge in what would normally be a safe seat for renomination, made an issue of García's involvement in the Wedtech scandal, which resulted in the loss of 1,500 jobs in the economically challenged district. In the primary, Espada was endorsed by The New York Times, which called him "articulate, focused and knowledgeable about health and poverty" based on his experience with the Soundview Health Center. The Times encouraged voters to "send a powerful message by supporting candidates who have been neither burned nor singed". Espada was also endorsed by El Diario and The Amsterdam News, but received few endorsements from political figures. García won renomination with 60 percent of the vote to Espada's 27 percent.

Espada was elected to represent the 32nd Senate district in the Bronx. He represented that district from 1993 to 1996 and again from 2001 to 2002.

In July 1996, the New York Observer reported that Espada did not live in the district he represented.

Also in 1996, Espada was indicted for using $70,000 from a city-financed HMO to fund his unsuccessful reelection campaign.

When Espada's son, Pedro Gautier Espada, was elected to the New York State Assembly in 1996, the two became the first father and son in the New York State Legislature to represent different districts in the Bronx.

In the 1996 primary, the Bronx Democratic Party ran a candidate against Espada and successfully challenged his petitions in court. Espada ran on the Liberal Party line, and lost to David Rosado, 78% to 21%. In their 2000 rematch, Espada wrested the Democratic nomination from Rosado, who was forced to defend his seat in the Senate on the Liberal and Working Families Party lines. Espada, having the Democratic line, won the election handily.

In 2000, Espada was acquitted on charges of using $200,000 from a Soundview Health Management Organization to pay off campaign debts from 1996. He was found not guilty by arguing that the HMO was allowed to do as it wished with federal money. Four employees were found guilty of using taxpayer funds to help the campaigns of Espada and his son.

In 2001, Espada ran for Bronx Borough President, but was defeated by Adolfo Carrion Jr. in the Democratic primary election. Carrion received 48,913 votes, Espada received 44,124 votes, and June Margolin Eislan received 26,815 votes.

The State of New York pulled funding for some of Espada's nonprofits in 2002 due to "administrative deficiencies and apparent misuse of funds."

In 2002, Espada was defeated in a Democratic primary for his Senate seat. Incumbent City Councilmember Rubén Díaz Sr. won that primary by 97 votes. Espada sought a new primary in court, but was denied. He then ran unsuccessfully for his old seat on the Republican and Independence lines while remaining registered as a Democrat.

Espada was elected to the Senate in 2008 in the 33rd district, defeating incumbent Democrat Efrain Gonzalez. The 33rd district was located in the Northwest Bronx, including the neighborhoods of Bedford Park, Fordham, Norwood, and Kingsbridge Heights. At that time, he owed in excess of $60,000 in fines to the New York City Campaign Finance Board related to races as far back as his 2001 run for Bronx Borough President. The campaign for his 2008 State Senate run had not registered with the New York State Board of Elections and fines were assessed against Espada's 2000 Senate campaign for required reports that had not been filed. Espada acknowledged that mistakes had been made but insisted that some of the accusations were unfair.

Espada voted in favor of same-sex marriage legislation on December 2, 2009, but the bill was defeated.

=== June 2009 leadership crisis ===
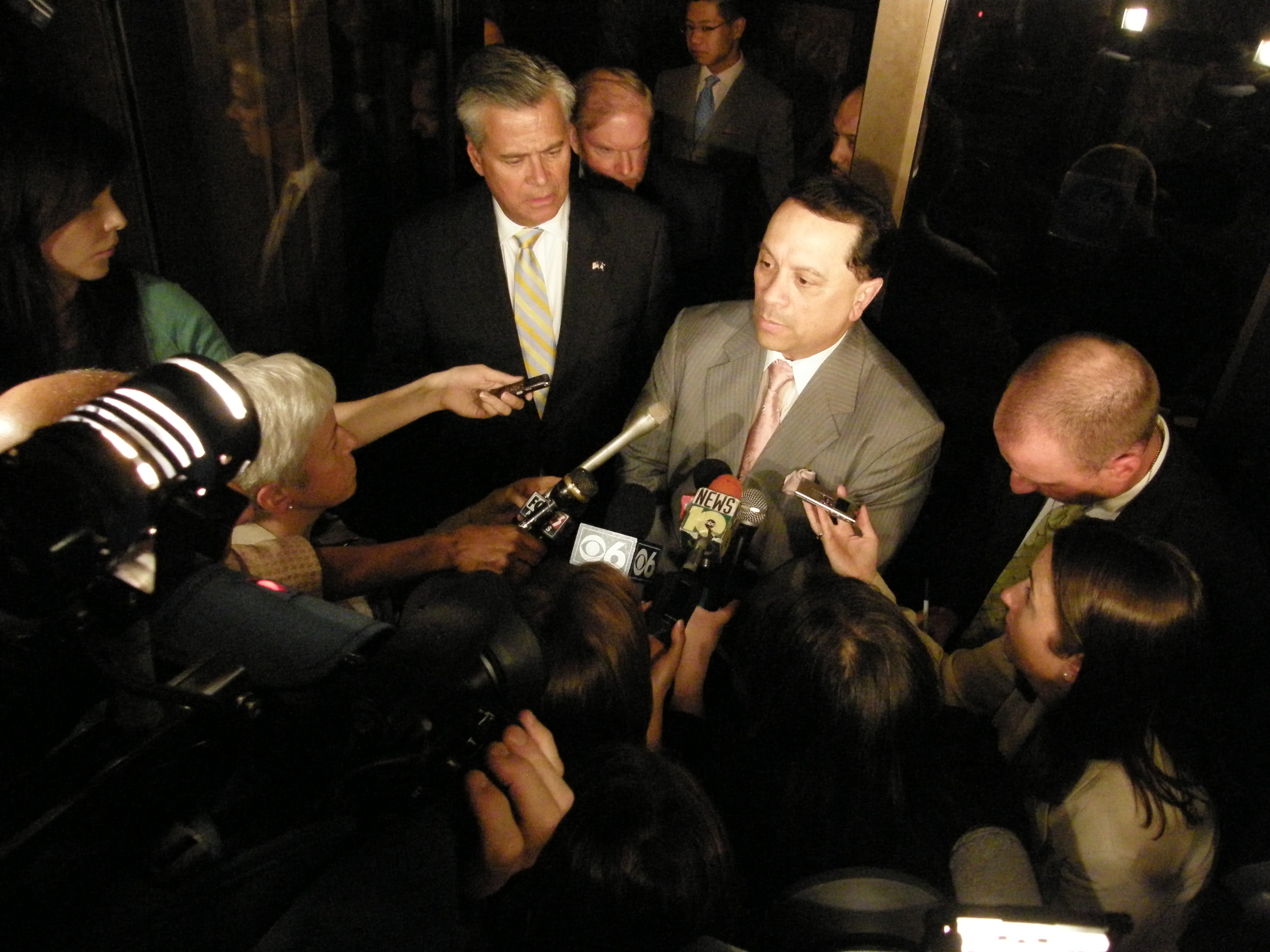
Espada speaking with Dean Skelos during the Senate leadership crisis.

Though there were 32 Democrats and 30 Republicans in the Senate, on June 8, 2009, Espada and Hiram Monserrate (D-Queens) were part of what was described by the Associated Press as a "parliamentary coup" and voted with the 30 Republican members to install Senator Dean Skelos (R-Nassau) as the new majority leader of the Senate, replacing Senator Malcolm Smith (D-Queens). In a press release posted to his Senate web page, Espada emphasized that "I remain a staunch, reform Democrat. I have not switched parties," and that his actions were intended to help end the "gridlock, paralysis, secretiveness, threats and partisan politics" that the Senate had experienced in the previous months and that he was not part of "a power grab or a coup" but was working to build a coalition to serve the needs of all New Yorkers with open and transparent government. When asked whether he held an allegiance to the Democratic Party, Espada responded that he owed nothing to a political party that had spent "hundreds of thousands" to defeat him in past elections.

The switch was preceded by several weeks of private talks brokered by upstate billionaire Tom Golisano.

In the early evening of July 9, 2009, Espada switched his allegiance back with the Democratic Party, and was then selected the Senate Majority Leader of the New York State Senate. He is the first Hispanic to have held that post.

=== 2009–2010 investigations and legal difficulties ===
Espada claimed a co-op apartment in Bedford Park as his district residence. Several residents of the Bronx co-op said they never saw him there. The Bronx County District Attorney opened an investigation in 2009.

In 2009, New York State Attorney General Andrew Cuomo investigated Espada's use of the Soundview Health Clinic for personal political reasons. Clinic offices also advertised Espada's name on the front canopy, displayed campaign posters on clinic grounds, and displayed posters of Espada surrounded by smiling children.

In 2010, Espada was investigated by federal investigators and the IRS for his ties with a consulting firm called "A-1 Multi-Service LLC" over suspicions that the firm, which appeared to not have a valid office, might be a shell company for tax fraud and money laundering.

On April 20, 2010, Cuomo sued Espada for siphoning $14 million from the Soundview Health Clinic for personal expenses. The lawsuit covered five years of spending, which included $80,000 in restaurant bills (which included $20,000 in sushi delivered to Espada's Mamaroneck home), personal trips including to Las Vegas and Puerto Rico, and renting a residence required to establish residency in the district for his Senate race in 2008. The lawsuit also sought to remove Espada from the board of directors of Soundview and replace the board, which Cuomo characterized as being "packed with family and friends that Mr. Espada could control directly and indirectly."

Federal and IRS agents raided two of Espada's offices in the Bronx on April 21, 2010 and his office records were subpoenaed the following day.

On April 24, 2010, Espada walked out of the taping of an interview with reporter Marcia Kramer of WCBS-TV after issues of his district residency were revisited. Espada became testy when Kramer reminded him that when she had approached him the previous year outside his Mamaroneck home, he had donned an orange ski cap and held a baby in front of his face to hide from the camera before speeding off in a car driven by his wife.

On April 29, 2010, Espada was hit with a civil lawsuit for allegedly pocketing $1.35 million in a sham job training program. The suit focused on "Espada Management Company", a company run by Espada's son and the company that was hired to provide janitorial services for Espada's Soundview Health Clinics. According to the suit, Espada paid the trainees below minimum wage — as little as $1.70/hr — to mop floors and scrub toilets.

During a later interview conducted by Diana Williams on WABC-TV, Espada's defense was characterized as turning personal against Andrew Cuomo. Espada repeatedly called Attorney General Cuomo the "Prince of Darkness" and claimed Cuomo's success to be because of the success of his father, former New York governor Mario Cuomo.

Several state senators—including fellow Democrats Neil Breslin, Darrel Aubertine, and David Valesky—called for Espada to step down from his Senate leadership positions. State Senator Martin Golden of Brooklyn also introduced an amendment to force Espada from his majority leader position. Nassau County District Attorney Kathleen Rice said that Espada could not lead anymore amid the investigations against him. State Senator Eric Schneiderman also called for Espada to step down from his Senate position and to forfeit his stipend.

On June 9, 2010, residents from the 33rd Bronx Senate district, which Espada represented, descended upon Espada's out-of-district Mamaroneck home in Westchester County to protest for his ousting.

=== 2010 re-election campaign ===
Despite being under investigation by the Bronx District Attorney, the FBI, the IRS, and the New York State Attorney General, Espada ran for re-election to his 33rd State Senate District seat. He was challenged by a number of candidates, including (José) Gustavo Rivera. The New Roosevelt Initiative, an independent expenditure group led by Bill Samuels, pledged to donate $250,000 to a candidate who sought to defeat Espada.

The New York State Democratic Committee launched efforts to oust Espada from the party. The week of July 5, the Committee sent a letter to Bronx party leaders calling for the cancellation of Espada's membership. They said Espada did not support party goals because he had joined with Republicans the previous summer in the power play that ground Senate business to a halt for a month. In response, on July 12, 2010, Espada claimed that the charges against him were filed due to racism. Espada said, "If you look brown and you're an immigrant, you're not supposed to have power". Furthermore, Espada proclaimed, "I have God on my side!"

Espada lost the primary election to Gustavo Rivera on September 14, 2010, 32.66% to 62.21%. In his concession speech, Espada blamed unions, outside influence, and the media for his defeat. Espada also refused to call primary winner Rivera personally.

=== Indictment, demotion, conviction, and aftermath ===
On December 14, 2010, Espada and his son, Pedro Gautier Espada, were indicted on six federal counts of embezzlement and theft. The indictment was by U.S. Attorney Loretta E. Lynch, and also announced by New York State Attorney General and Governor-elect Andrew Cuomo. According to Cuomo, the Espadas embezzled public money for personal use, including purchases of food, Broadway show tickets, and a down payment for a Bentley automobile. They faced up to 55 years in prison if convicted of all charges.

The same day Espada was indicted, he was stripped of his title and position as Senate Majority Leader. He left office in January 2011.

At trial prosecutors presented that Espada had embezzled a total of $618,669. On May 14, 2012, a federal jury found Espada guilty of embezzling money from federally funded healthcare clinics. Shortly afterward, prosecutors brought a separate indictment for filing a false tax return. Espada plead guilty to this charge, waiving his right to appeal.

At sentencing, prosecutors called Espada an "unapologetic poster child of charity abuse." Judge Frederic Block sentenced Espada to five years in prison in June 2013.

Espada served his prison sentence in the Metropolitan Detention Center in Brooklyn, New York. While incarcerated, he complained about the conditions at the facility. Espada's prisoner number was 78764-053 and he was released on October 30, 2017.

Throughout his imprisonment and after his release, Espada made several challenges to his conviction and sentence, each time without success.

== See also ==
- 2009 New York State Senate leadership crisis
- List of minority governors and lieutenant governors in the United States

== Notes ==
New York State Senate
Preceded by Efrain Gonzalez	New York State Senate, 32nd district 1993–1996	Succeeded by David Rosado
Preceded by David Rosado	New York State Senate, 32nd district 2001–2002	Succeeded by Rubén Díaz Sr.
Preceded by Efrain Gonzalez	New York State Senate, 33rd district 2009–2010	Succeeded by Gustavo Rivera
Political offices
Preceded by Rubén Díaz Sr.	New York City Council, 18th district 2003	Succeeded by Annabel Palma
Preceded by John Bonacic	Chairman of the Senate Committee on Housing Construction and Community Development; 2009–2010	Succeeded by Catharine Young
Preceded by 2009 New York State Senate leadership crisis	Majority Leader of the New York State Senate; 2009–2010	Succeeded by Dean Skelos
