= Lucy Cruz =

American politician

Member of the New York City Council from the 18th district
- In office January 1, 1992 – December 31, 2001
- Preceded by: Morton Povman
- Succeeded by: Rubén Díaz Sr.

Personal details
- Born: Bayamón, Puerto Rico
- Political party: Democratic

Lucy Cruz is an American politician who served in the New York City Council from the 18th district from 1992 to 2001.

Political offices
Preceded by Morton Povman	Member of the New York City Council from the 18th district 1992–2001	Succeeded by Rubén Díaz Sr.
