= Rubén Díaz Sr. =

American politician (born 1943)

Rubén Díaz
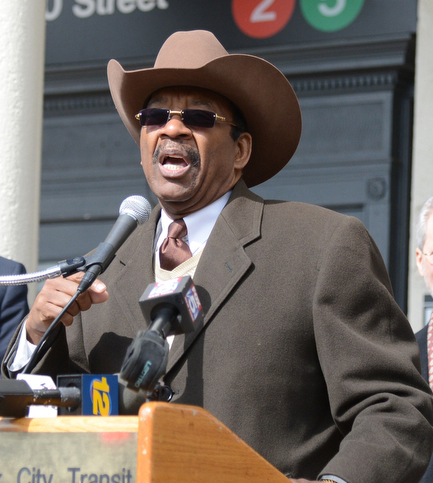

Member of the New York City Council from the 18th district
- In office January 1, 2018 – December 31, 2021
- Preceded by: Annabel Palma
- Succeeded by: Amanda Farías
- In office January 1, 2002 – January 1, 2003
- Preceded by: Lucy Cruz
- Succeeded by: Pedro Espada Jr.

Member of the New York Senate from the 32nd district
- In office January 1, 2003 – December 31, 2017
- Preceded by: Pedro Espada Jr.
- Succeeded by: Luis Sepúlveda

Personal details
- Born: April 22, 1943 (age 83) Bayamón, Puerto Rico
- Party: Democratic
- Spouse: Leslie Ivette Diaz
- Children: Rubén Díaz Jr.
- Education: Lehman College (BA)

Military service
- Allegiance: United States
- Branch/service: United States Army
- Years of service: 1960–1963

Rubén Díaz Sr. (born April 22, 1943) is a Puerto Rican politician from New York City and an ordained Pentecostal minister. He represented the 18th district of the New York City Council from 2018 to 2021. A member of the Democratic Party, Díaz represented the 32nd district in the New York State Senate from 2003 to 2017; his Senate district included parts of the Bronx neighborhoods of Castle Hill, Parkchester, Morrisania, Hunts Point, Melrose, Longwood, and Soundview. A socially conservative Democrat, Díaz is known for his outspoken opposition to abortion and same-sex marriage.

== Early life and education ==
Born and raised in Bayamón, Puerto Rico, Díaz served in the United States Army beginning in 1960, ultimately obtaining an honorable discharge three years later. He moved to New York City in 1965. Also in 1965, Díaz pleaded guilty to marijuana and heroin possession charges and was sentenced to probation.

Díaz became an evangelical Christian in 1966. He earned a bachelor's degree from Lehman College in 1976.

== Career ==
=== Early career ===
Díaz formed a senior center, Christian Community in Action, in 1977. In 1978, he became an ordained minister of the Church of God, which describes itself as evangelical and pentecostal. Díaz formed Christian Community Neighborhood Church; as of 2017, he remained a pastor of that church. Díaz is the founder and president of the New York Hispanic Clergy Organization.

In 1993, Díaz was appointed to serve on New York City's Civilian Complaint Review Board. In 1994, while on the Civilian Complaint Review Board, Díaz was critical of the city hosting the Gay Games, claiming that doing so would lead to an increase in AIDS cases and to wider acceptance of homosexuality by young people. Díaz wrote that hosting the Games would lead children "to conclude that if there are so many gay and lesbian athletes then there is nothing wrong, nor any risks involved." Other members of the Board condemned Díaz's comments.

=== New York State Senate ===
In 2002, Diaz was elected to the New York State Senate. He represented the 32nd district in the New York State Senate from 2003 to 2017; his Senate district included parts of the Bronx neighborhoods of Castle Hill, Parkchester, Morrisania, Hunts Point, Melrose, Longwood, and Soundview.

In 2007, Díaz expressed anger at Governor Eliot Spitzer after Spitzer reversed course and abandoned his plan to allow undocumented immigrants to obtain New York driver's licenses. Díaz said he had been betrayed by Spitzer.

Díaz was one of three Democratic Senators, known as the "Gang of Three", who threatened to abandon the Democratic majority elected to the New York State Senate on November 4, 2008. A fourth, Senator-elect Hiram Monserrate, backed out of the group in early November. According to a memorandum leaked to the New York Times in December 2008, the remaining "Gang of Three" tried to use their leverage to have one of them named Senate Majority Leader and another named chair of the Senate Finance Committee, and to obtain a guarantee that the Senate would not vote on the issue of same-sex marriage. This deal fell through, and the three reached a compromise in which they recognized State Senator Malcolm Smith as Senate Majority Leader in January 2009.

In 2010, Díaz was challenged by Carlos "Charlie" Ramos in a Democratic primary campaign. Díaz won the primary by a margin of 79% to 22%. Ramos' campaign complained of a number of polling irregularities, including intimidation of voters, bringing campaign literature into polling sites, and expelling certified poll watchers who worked for Ramos.

Díaz is known for his "What You Should Know" column, which he began writing in 2012 and which began being published in 2016 in La Voz Internacional, a bilingual conservative online newspaper.

=== New York City Council ===
Diaz was first elected to the New York City Council in 2001. He was elected to the New York State Senate the following year.

Díaz won the 2017 Democratic primary for the 16th district of the New York City Council with 42% of the vote. In November 2017, Díaz was elected to the City Council in District 18.

Díaz created controversy in February 2019 after asserting that the City Council was "controlled by the homosexual community". On February 13, 2019, the City Council voted to disband the Diaz-chaired Committee on For-Hire Vehicles, and Council Speaker Corey Johnson called for his resignation.

In July 2020, Díaz announced that he would not seek re-election in 2021. He was succeeded by Amanda Farías.

=== 2020 U.S. House of Representatives election ===
In April 2019, Díaz declared his candidacy for the U.S. House of Representatives in New York's 15th congressional district. On June 23, 2020, he lost the Democratic primary, finishing third out of 12 candidates (behind victor Ritchie Torres and second-place finisher Michael Blake).

== Political positions ==
=== Abortion and stem cell research ===
Díaz has taken prominent public positions against abortion and against embryonic stem cell research.

Diaz has written the following: "'Hitler used the ashes of the Jews to make bars of soap. In America, we are selling fetal tissue to be used in: the manufacture of cosmetics as well as for medical research. What is the difference? Do not point your finger at Hitler, we are worse'". In 2008, when a colleague proposed legislation that would expand abortion rights in New York, Díaz described the bill as "one of the most dangerous and radical pieces of proposed legislation in New York State that I have ever seen." Díaz again compared abortion to the Holocaust in May 2012, drawing criticism from the Anti-Defamation League.

=== LGBT issues ===
In 2003, Díaz filed a lawsuit to stop the expansion of the Harvey Milk School, claiming that the school infringed upon the rights of heterosexual students. The lawsuit was settled in 2006 after the school agreed not to discriminate against heterosexual students and not to restrict admission to students who identify as LGBT, and after the City of New York agreed that the school would be open to all students.

In 2007, as his party—led by Governor Eliot Spitzer and Lt. Governor David Paterson—sought to pass same-sex marriage legislation, Díaz opposed the bill and was highly critical of Democratic support for it. Díaz's opposition to same-sex marriage continued in 2008, when he vowed to vote against same-sex marriage legislation and to withhold his support from any Senate Majority Leader who would allow the bill to become law. In May 2009, Díaz led a rally against same-sex marriage in front of the New York City office of Governor David Paterson; the rally was attended by an estimated 20,000 participants.

In a November 2009 piece in The New York Times, Díaz was quoted as saying that he "love[s]" his gay and lesbian relatives, but "[doesn't] believe in what they are doing". The same article quoted Díaz's openly gay chief counsel, who described Díaz as "a true believer in Christian values, in treating people the way you want to be treated."

On December 2, 2009, Díaz voted against same-sex marriage legislation, which failed to pass the Senate.

On May 15, 2011, Díaz led a rally of same-sex marriage opponents in the Bronx. His granddaughter Erica Diaz, who is openly lesbian, led a counterprotest. During Díaz's speech, his granddaughter came up on the stage with him, and Díaz hugged and kissed her and said, "This is my granddaughter. I love her. I love her. I love her. I respect her decisions. She does what she wants." Erica subsequently stated that "You cannot tell someone that you love them and stay silent when people call for their death. 'Love' is empty when you say someone's life isn't natural." Díaz reported receiving numerous death threats, and a New York gay bar said it would hold a "Fuck Ruben Diaz" event.

On June 24, 2011, Díaz once again voted against allowing same-sex marriage in New York; however, this time the measure passed the Senate by a vote of 33–29. Governor Andrew Cuomo signed the bill later that evening.

In 2017, Díaz helped to prevent the passage of the Gender Expression Non-Discrimination Act (GENDA), a transgender rights bill, by voting against it in committee. Díaz previously voted against GENDA in committee in 2010.

In 2019, Díaz described the New York City Council as being "controlled by the homosexual community."

=== Donald Trump ===
Díaz endorsed Donald Trump in the 2024 United States presidential election.

== Personal life ==
Diaz and his first wife, Didionilda Díaz (Vega), have three children. One of their sons, Rubén Díaz Jr., is also a politician and was elected Bronx Borough President in April 2009. As of June 14, 2015, Díaz is married to Leslie Díaz.

== See also ==
- 2009 New York State Senate leadership crisis
- Anti-abortion movement
- LGBT rights opposition
- Paterson, David "Black, Blind, & In Charge: A Story of Visionary Leadership and Overcoming Adversity."Skyhorse Publishing. New York, New York, 2020

Political offices
| Preceded by Lucy Cruz | Member of the New York City Council from the 18th district 2002–2003 | Succeeded by Pedro Espada Jr. |
| Preceded by Annabel Palma | Member of the New York City Council from the 18th district 2018–2021 | Succeeded by Amanda Farías |
New York State Senate
| Preceded by Pedro Espada Jr. | Member of the New York Senate from the 32nd district 2003–2017 | Succeeded by Luis Sepúlveda |
