= 2009 New York State Senate leadership crisis =

Political dispute in the United States

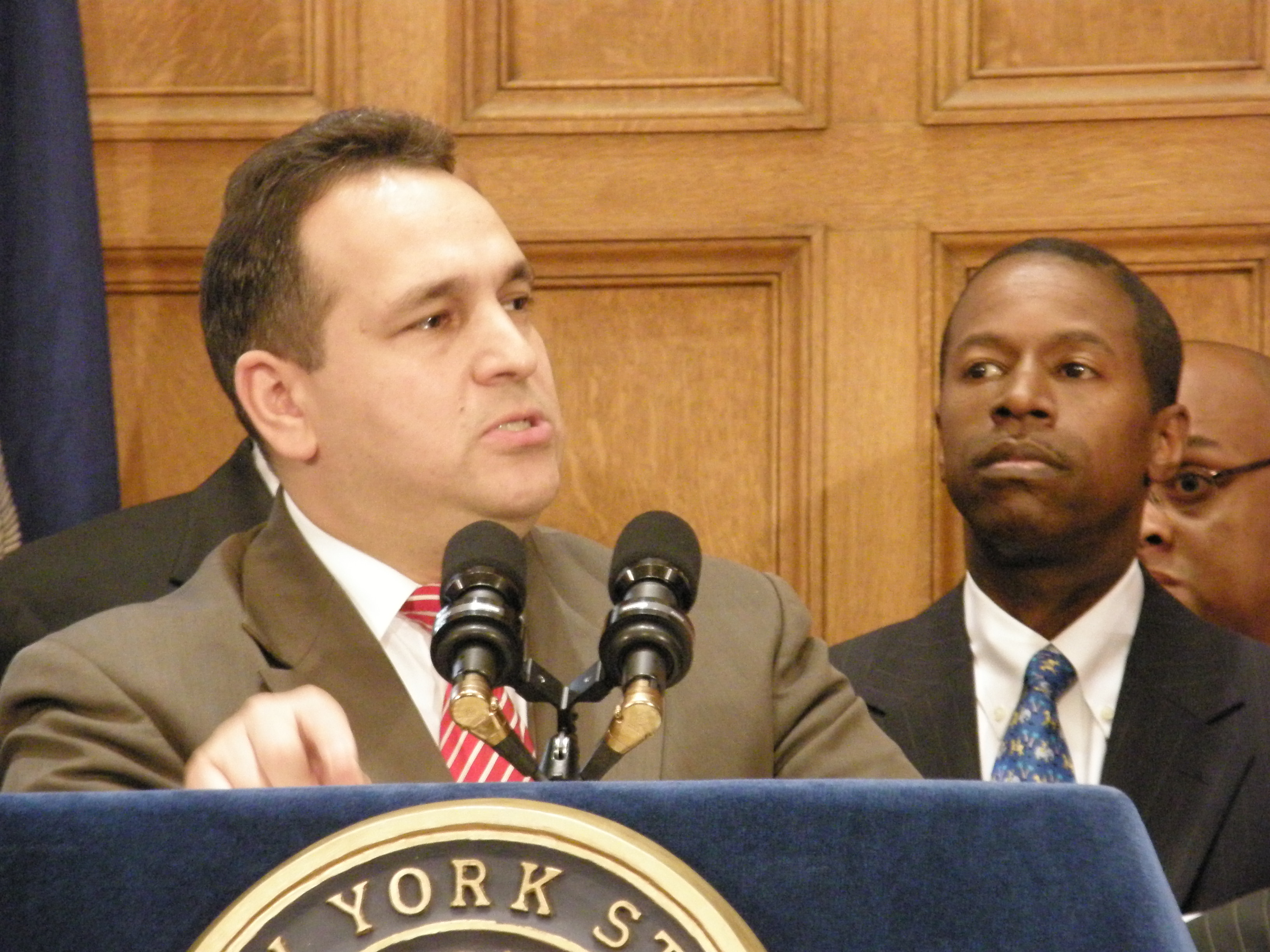
- Hiram Monserrate and Malcolm Smith during the crisis
- Date: June 8 – July 9, 2009
- Location: Albany, New York
- Cause: Hiram Monserrate and Pedro Espada Jr. joining Republicans to oust Leader Malcolm Smith; Resignation of Eliot Spitzer
- Outcome: Smith remains leader. Richard Ravitch becomes Lieutenant Governor

The New York State Capitol

The 2009 New York State Senate leadership crisis was a political dispute and constitutional crisis that prevented the New York State Senate from functioning for a month.

In 2009, the State Senate was controlled by Democrats with a narrow 32–30 majority. On June 8, 2009, a coalition of all 30 Senate Republicans and two Democrats, Hiram Monserrate and Pedro Espada Jr., voted to replace Senate Majority Leader Malcolm Smith with then-Senate Republican Leader Dean Skelos. The coalition appeared to have gained control of the Senate in a move that was described as a political coup. However, on June 15, Monserrate left the coalition and returned to the Democrats' side. The result was a 31–31 tie in the Senate. Upon the March 17, 2008, resignation of Gov. Eliot Spitzer following a sex scandal, then-Lieutenant Governor David Paterson had been sworn in as Governor of New York; this left the position of Lieutenant Governor vacant. The absence of a Lieutenant Governor (whose duties include serving as President of the Senate) left no apparent way to break the 31–31 deadlock; therefore, the Senate was unable to conduct business. Governor Paterson attempted to pressure the Senate into action by withholding their salaries and convening mandatory special Senate sessions, but his efforts were unsuccessful.

On July 8, Governor Paterson appointed Richard Ravitch as Lieutenant Governor in an effort to break the Senate deadlock. However, Attorney General Andrew Cuomo argued that the appointment was illegal. The next day, Espada announced that he was returning to the Democrats, giving them a 32–30 majority once more and effectively ending the crisis; following this move, Espada was given the title of Senate Majority Leader, while Smith remained Temporary President of the Senate. The appointment of Ravitch as Lieutenant Governor was eventually upheld by the New York Court of Appeals.

== History ==
=== Background ===
The State Senate had been controlled by Republicans since 1965, but Democrats were able to win a majority in the 2008 elections. The change was helped by upstate billionaire Tom Golisano, who had donated $5 million to the Democrats' campaigns. However, dissatisfaction with the job that Majority Leader Malcolm Smith was doing was growing with his fellow Democrats, as well as with Golisano.

Golisano, with the aid of his political adviser Steve Pigeon, set up a series of private meetings between Republican senators Dean Skelos, Tom Libous, and George D. Maziarz, and after Pigeon convinced him, Democratic senator Pedro Espada Jr. The first meeting took place at a club in Albany, followed by one at Golisano's house in Rochester, followed by a series at Espada's house in Albany. Espada said that Senator Monserrate was the only one among his fellow Democrats that knew of the meetings.

Republican strategist Roger Stone may have been involved in the discussions, and according to Pigeon, knew about the plan in advance. Golisano, who recently moved to Florida, did not take part in the meetings at Espada's house, but was kept informed by Pigeon. On June 4, Pigeon told Golisano that the deal "was real solid," and on June 8, Golisano was in Albany to watch the events unfold from the Senate chamber balcony.

=== June 8 Senate 'coup' ===
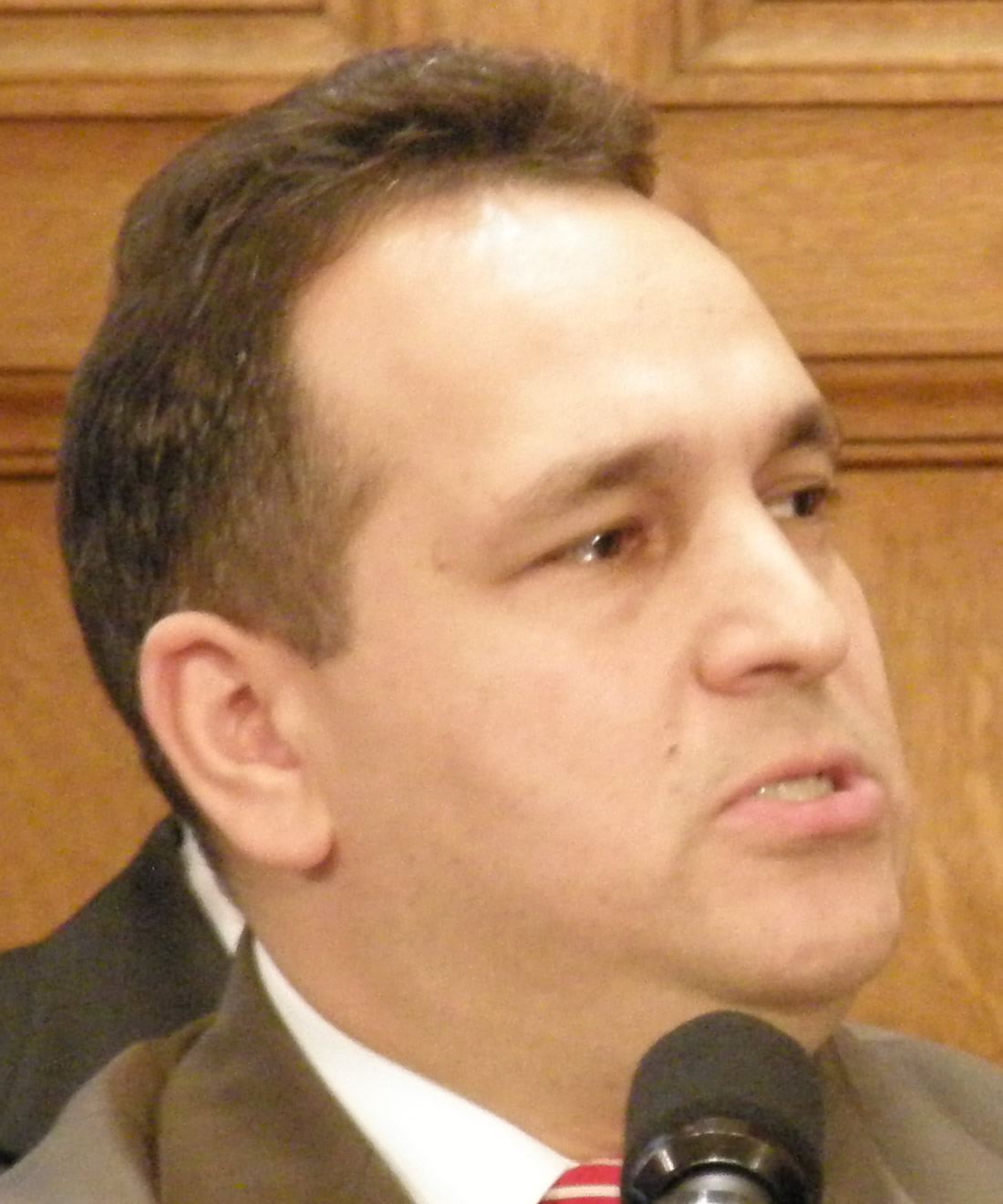
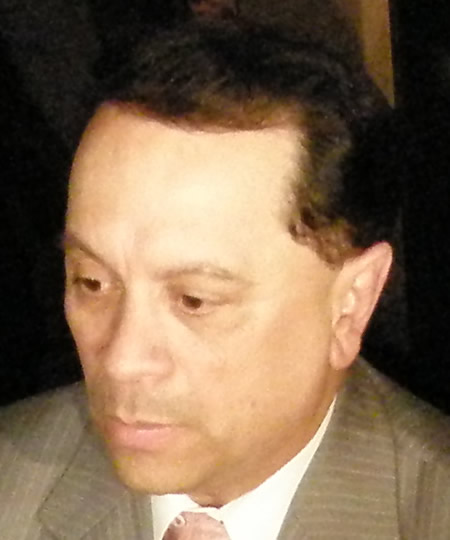
Democratic State Senators Hiram Monserrate (left), and Pedro Espada (right), voted with Senate Republicans to change leadership.

During the Senate session on June 8, Republican Senator Thomas Libous proposed a resolution, similar to a motion of no confidence, that would allow for the election of a new leader of the Senate. The entire 32-senator coalition voted for the resolution. After the resolution was passed, but before the vote was recognized by officiating officer, Senator Neil Breslin, Senator Jeffrey Klein moved for adjournment. Libous demanded that his resolution be recognized, but instead Breslin quickly granted Klein's motion for adjournment. Republicans objected, claiming a majority of the Senate did not vote to adjourn. After Breslin declared the meeting adjourned, all but four Democratic senators walked out of the Senate chamber. The Democrats who stayed were Espada and Monserrate, who had voted for the resolution, and Carl Kruger and Ruben Diaz, who abstained from all voting during the course of events but stayed to show their support.

After the 28 Democratic senators walked out of the Senate chamber, Secretary of the Senate Angelo Aponte turned off the lights in the Senate chamber and stopped the TV broadcast of the Senate session. Nevertheless, the remaining senators proceeded to vote for new leadership, removing Democratic Senator Malcolm Smith from his position as Majority Leader and Temporary President of the Senate, and replacing him with two people: Republican Minority Leader Dean Skelos as Majority Leader, and Pedro Espada as Temporary President. (Note: The position is named "temporary" because the Lieutenant Governor is the ex officio President of the State Senate, while the Temporary President is chosen by the senators. It is common, especially in the newsmedia, for the terms "temporary president", "president pro tempore", or "Senate president" to be used synonymously. In addition, the legal terminology has changed as the New York Constitution was changed. For more, see Majority Leader of the New York State Senate.) Historically, the majority leadership and the temporary presidency of the Senate were held by the same person. However, in the new arrangement, Espada was to be the Temporary President of the Senate, while Skelos would become Majority Leader.

After the election of the new leadership, the coalition enacted reform rules including a six-year term limit for the majority leader, steps to equalize budget differences between opposing parties, as well as rules about the distribution of pork barrel projects. Despite voting for the change in leadership, Espada and Monserrate stated that they were still Democrats, and that there was still a 32–30 Democratic majority in the Senate.

=== Immediate reaction ===
The Democrats claimed that the change was illegal, and that therefore Malcolm Smith was still the Majority Leader and Temporary President. According to Smith and other Democrats, Senator Neil Breslin had accepted a motion to adjourn, and therefore ended the session before the Republicans voted to change leadership.

Smith also claimed that the attempted power shift was not legal, even if the resolution did pass. He issued a statement saying that he "was elected to a two year term pursuant to a resolution passed by a majority of Senators in January 2009", and that "the purported coup was an unlawful violation of New York State law and the Senate rules". However, there was precedent for changing the majority leader midterm, as Ralph J. Marino was ousted during the Thanksgiving holiday in 1994.

Lieutenant Governor David Paterson criticized the initial motion by Senator Libous as "despicable" and "an outrage" due to the issues that were still on the table in the remainder of the legislative session.

=== Legal actions ===
On June 10, Malcolm Smith said he was seeking a temporary court order to prevent the Republicans from taking power. Later in the day, Justice Karen Peters, a judge in the Appellate Division of the Supreme Court, granted Senator Smith's request for a temporary restraining order against Espada. The restraining order prevented Espada from exercising the power granted to the temporary president of the Senate under Article IV, §6, of the New York Constitution, which include the elevation of Senate president to acting governor when the governor is out of state or incapacitated. The order was valid until the outcome of a Supreme Court hearing, which was scheduled for the next day. The ruling put Sheldon Silver, Speaker of the New York State Assembly, temporarily next-in-line of succession to the governor's office. This restraining order was vacated by Justice Thomas J. McNamara on June 16. McNamara refused to intervene in the dispute, saying that "a judicially imposed resolution would be an improvident intrusion into the internal workings of a co-equal branch of government"; McNamara urged the senators to solve the problem by negotiation.

Separately from Senator Smith's request, Senator Neil Breslin attempted to file an injunction on June 11. The injunction was denied by New York Supreme Court Justice George Ceresia.

On June 24, Republican senators John Flanagan and George Winner filed a petition with Justice McNamara, requesting that Aponte be forced to recognize the authority of Skelos and Espada. Aponte had instructed the chamber's stenographer, journal clerk, and sergeants-at-arms to ignore any orders from the Republican leaders. On June 26, McNamara adjourned the case to allow the Senators more time for discussion.

=== Initial attempts to hold session ===
On June 9, the day following the attempted power shift, Aponte denied Espada the keys to the Senate chamber, at which point Espada accused Aponte of abusing his power and asked for his resignation. Aponte refused, responding "I was appointed legislatively for a two year term and I intend to serve out my two year term." The following day, June 10, Espada acquired the keys, but not from Aponte or any of the Senate Democrats.

On June 11, minutes after Neil Breslin's requested injunction was denied, the Republican-led coalition held a brief session, but they were unable to conduct business because the Democratic conference had locked away the bills, and also had withheld the stenographer, who is required for official business. This proved immaterial, as the coalition would not have had the required votes necessary to pass a bill. Hiram Monserrate voted "present", and then left the session, leaving 31 senators in the session, one shy of the 32 votes needed to pass a bill. Monserrate said that he would not vote on anything until more Democrats joined the Senate session, and instead wanted to create a compromise that included the Democrats who were boycotting the session. Monserrate's decision to not vote on any issues led to rumors that he might flip back to the Democrats' side.

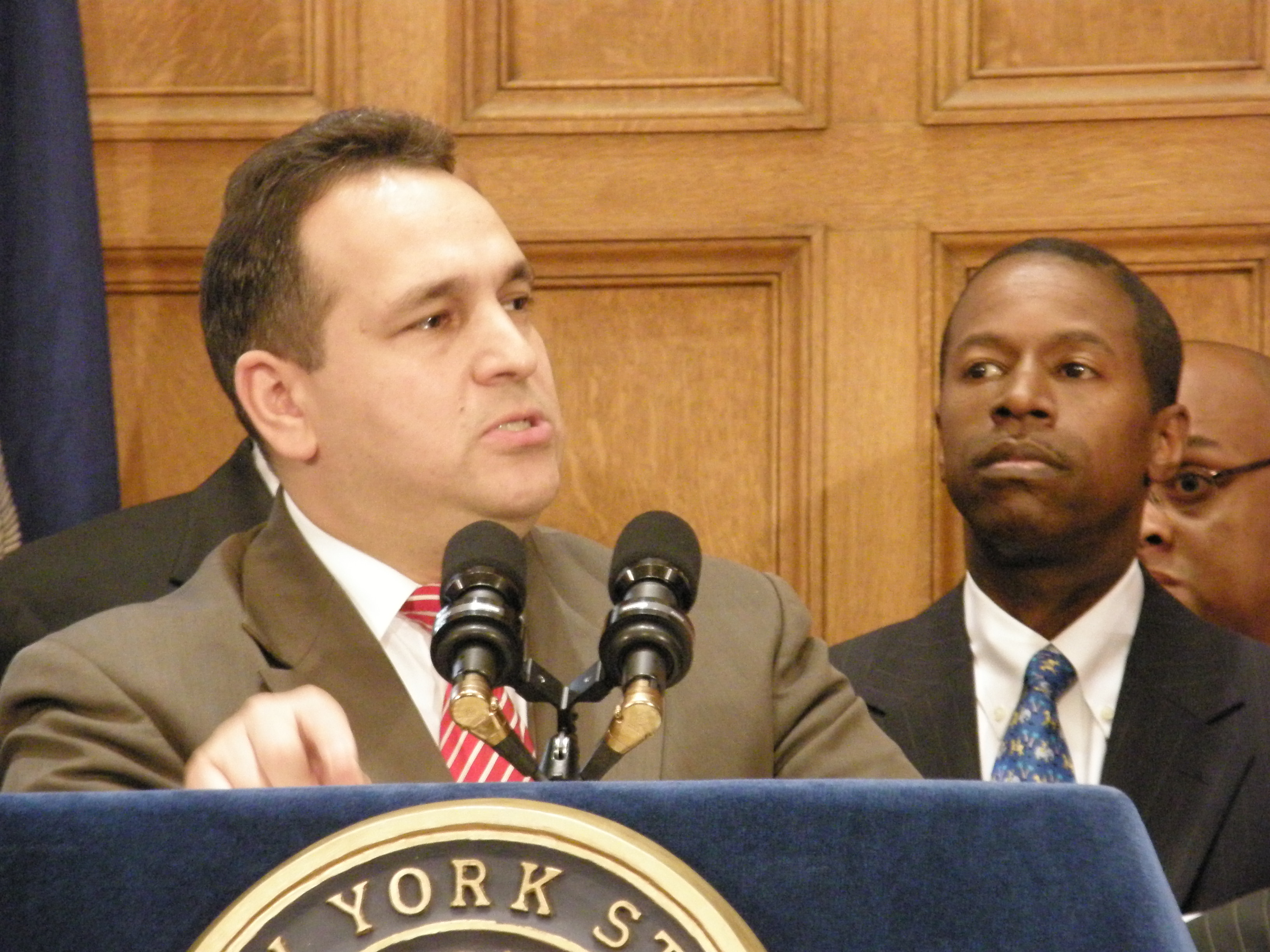
Hiram Monserrate announces he is leaving the coalition and returning to the Democrats as Malcolm Smith looks on.

=== Hiram Monserrate returns to the Democratic caucus; legislative deadlock results ===
Senate Republicans were confident that Monserrate would stay on their side. However, on June 12, Monserrate was praising Democratic Senator John Sampson, who was the front-runner to replace Senator Smith as the Democratic leader. On June 15, in an apparent effort to woo Monserrate, Democrats voted Senator John Sampson as their de facto leader. The move proved successful for the Democrats, as later that day Senator Monserrate declared he would once again caucus with the Democrats.

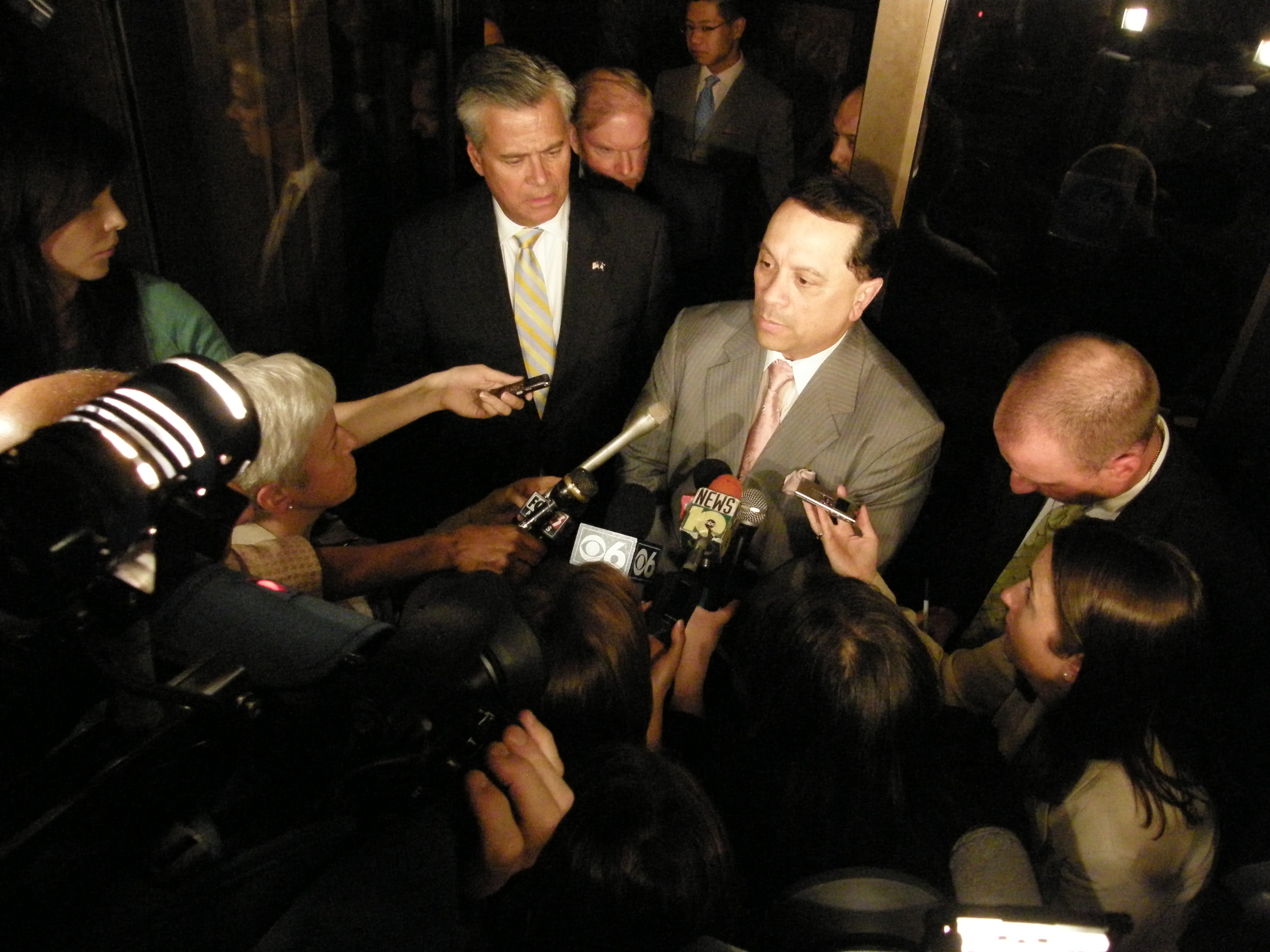
Pedro Espada and Dean Skelos address the media following the June 23 Special Senate session.

Monserrate's decision to return to the Democrats meant that the Senate was evenly divided between the 31-member Democratic caucus and the 31-member Republican caucus; there was no clear way to break the tie. In the case of a tie vote in the Senate, a casting vote—also called a tie-breaking vote—can be taken by the Lieutenant Governor; however, there is debate over the meaning of the term "casting vote". (Note: For more information about legislative crises in New York, see Theophilus C. Callicot and the tied Assembly of 1863; the seven weeks lasting deadlock of the 1881 United States Senate special elections in New York; John C. Jacobs and the Senate leadership crisis of 1882; Daniel D. Frisbie and the U.S. Senatorial election crisis in 1911; and Joseph Zaretzki and the Senate leadership crisis of 1965.) Furthermore, the lieutenant governorship had been vacant since David Paterson ascended to the governor's office upon the resignation of former Governor Eliot Spitzer. According to the State Constitution, if the Lieutenant Governor's office is vacant, the Temporary President of the Senate is to perform all of the Lieutenant Governor's duties. However, Senators Smith and Espada each claimed to be Temporary President of the Senate.

Special elections for lieutenant governor were forbidden by an amendment to the State Constitution after the death of Thomas W. Wallace and subsequent election of Joe R. Hanley in 1943. As of 2009, there was no provision in state law allowing the governor and legislature to appoint a replacement lieutenant governor as there was with other statewide positions. (Note: "No election of a lieutenant-governor shall be had in any event except at the time of electing a governor." see New York Constitution, Art. 4, § 6.)

On June 17, Espada asserted that because he was Senate president, he would effectively get to vote twice: once as a Senator, and again as Temporary President, who "[performs] all the duties of lieutenant governor", which includes breaking ties in the Senate.

On June 30, the Democrats took advantage of Republican State Senator Frank Padavan's brief walk through the Senate chamber to claim a quorum, but Governor Paterson said he did not believe Padavan's merely walking into the chamber created a quorum and so he would not sign any of the bills passed during that alleged quorum. They passed "non-controversial" bills, including a motel tax, 911 service fees, and a bond authorization for Nassau.

On July 7, Monserrate, accompanied by fellow Democratic Senator Ruben Diaz, walked out on the Democrats; the two stated that they were not abandoning the Democratic Conference, but that the power struggle must end.

=== Governor David Paterson's efforts to break the Senate deadlock ===
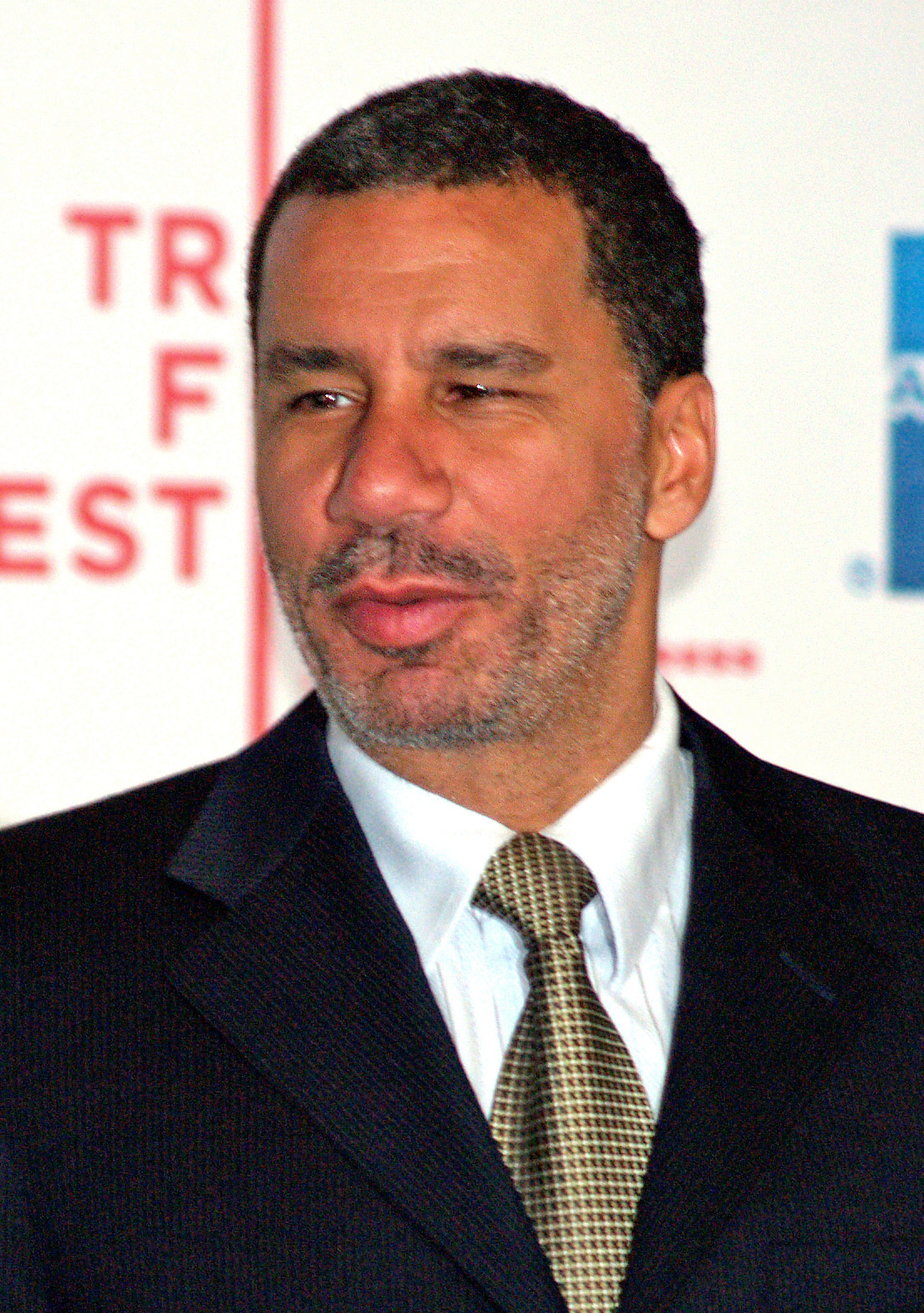
Governor David Paterson

Shortly following the attempted change in Senate leadership, Governor David Paterson announced that he would avoid out-of-state travel, saying "the best thing for me to do is to stay here."

The New York Constitution states that whenever the governor is out of state, the lieutenant governor becomes acting governor. Since there was no clear line of succession, it was unclear who would have become acting governor, which is a situation the Governor attempted to avoid. Paterson did not leave the state from June 8 until the resolution of the crisis, which required him to skip several out-of-state events.

On June 21, Governor Paterson announced that he would convene a special session on June 23 – setting "routine" but "time-sensitive" bills such as mayoral control over New York City schools, sales tax, and same-sex marriage bills on the agenda. He also stated that he would convene a special session every day, including weekends and July 4, until the senators finished their job.

On June 23, all senators met in the Senate chamber but each caucus held a separate session, ignoring the other. (Note: This erratic behavior has a historic precedent: in 1853, at the Democratic state convention two Chairmen were elected by the opposing Hard and Soft factions which then sat side by side and presided over the convention ignoring each other amid much confusion.) Governor Paterson then called daily extraordinary sessions of the State Senate, but each caucus met separately and adjourned without doing any business for lack of quorum. On request of Governor Paterson, Justice Joseph C. Teresi ordered the State Senators on June 29 to convene together the next day. The Republicans appealed.

On June 24, Governor Paterson asked that New York State Comptroller Thomas DiNapoli withhold the paychecks and per diems of the Senators retroactively from June 8, when Senate crisis initially started. Senator Kevin Parker rejected the idea, saying that Governor Paterson "doesn't have any constitutional or legal authority to dock our pay." DiNapoli initially said that he would look into the legality of the request. On July 2, DiNapoli agreed to withhold the Senators' pay, even though no court ruled that he had the authority to do so. Although the Senators' pay was being withheld, it could not be kept permanently, as the Constitution restricts changing the legislature's pay during session; it was disbursed after the crisis was resolved.

Paterson also declared that he would withhold $85 million in pork barrel grants. These grants were given to the senators individually to be spent on pet projects in the Senators' districts. However, the impact was negligible because no such projects had been approved in 2009.

==== Appointment of Richard Ravitch as lieutenant governor ====
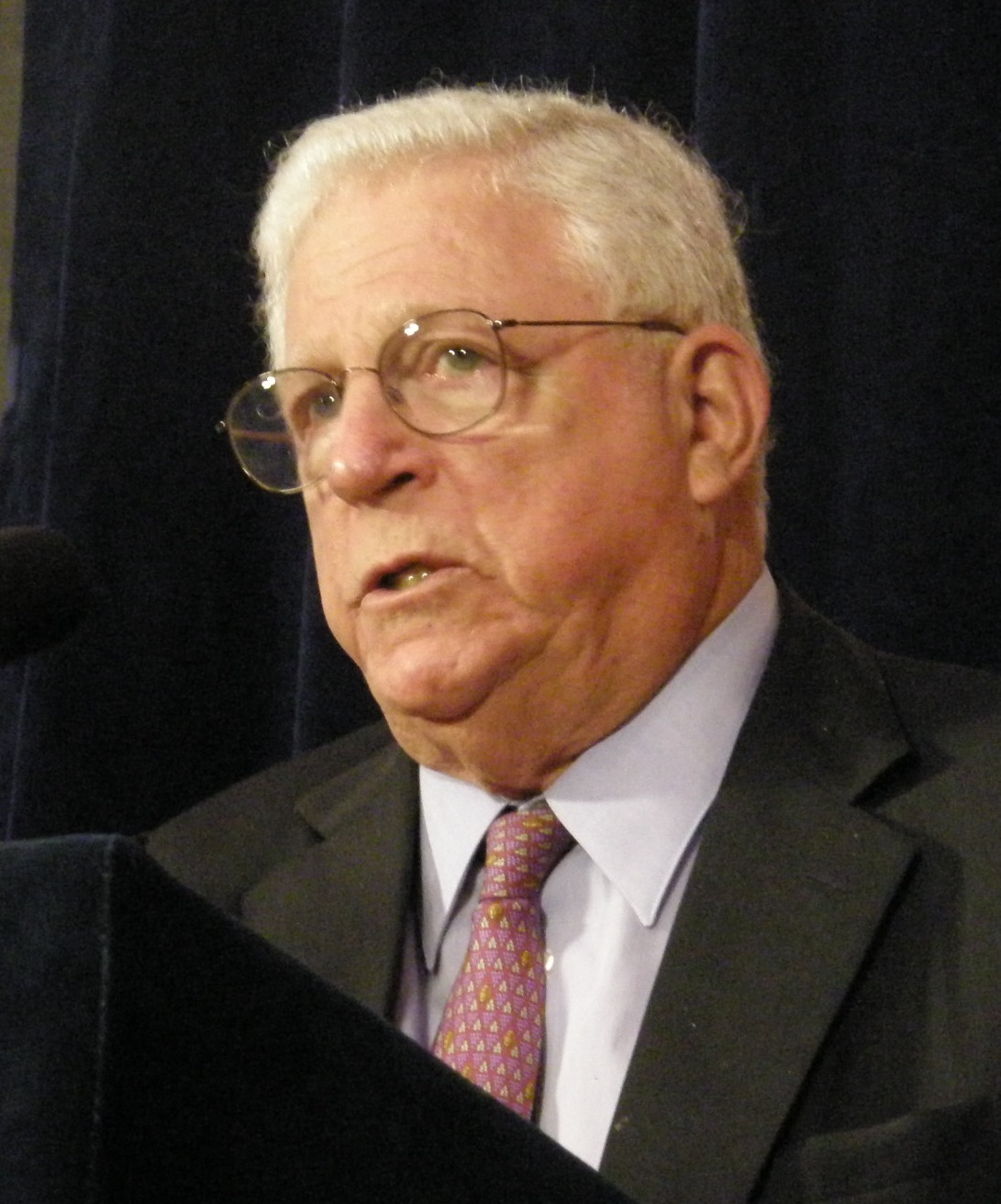
Richard Ravitch was appointed Lieutenant Governor by Governor Paterson.

On July 8, at 5:01 pm, Governor Paterson appointed former MTA chairman Richard Ravitch as Lieutenant Governor of New York, although, despite numerous vacancies, no lieutenant governor had ever been appointed in New York history. (Note: Vacancies in the lieutenant governor's office have been filled by special elections in 1811, 1847 and 1943, or were filled at the next gubernatorial election. Otherwise, the temporary presidents of the State Senate have acted as lieutenant governors under the provisions of all State Constitutions since 1777.) However, Paterson believed that he had the authority to fill the vacancy due to provisions of the New York State Public Officers Law.

The New York Constitution prohibits electing a lieutenant governor "except at the time of electing a governor," and provides that the "temporary president of the senate shall perform all the duties of lieutenant governor" in the absence of a lieutenant governor, and that the Speaker of the State Assembly is then next-in-line of succession to the governor's office in case of a vacancy of the temporary presidency of the Senate. However, State Assemblyman Michael Gianaris formed an interpretation of the Public Officers Laws that would allow Paterson to fill the vacancy by appointment. This interpretation was supported by an analysis by the Brennan Center for Justice at the New York University School of Law. It is also supported by good government groups Citizens Union and Common Cause, both of which urged Paterson to make an appointment.

Attorney General Andrew Cuomo held that Paterson's interpretation was unconstitutional, and that the appointment was not valid. Senator Espada announced he would sue to prevent the appointment, and said that this appointment had ruined Paterson's reputation as an impartial mediator of the situation. Senator Skelos also expressed his concern with the appointment, stating that "it's illegal, it's unconstitutional", and believed that it would create more chaos and government gridlock.

Ravitch was initially expected to be sworn in July 9, the day after his appointment, at 11:30 am. However, Paterson's administration officials rushed to swear in Ravitch quickly, ahead of the expected legal battles. He was sworn in at approximately 8 pm on July 8, just 3 hours after his appointment. Shortly thereafter, the necessary paperwork was filed with the Secretary of State's office.

=== Pedro Espada returns to the Democratic caucus; Democrats retake Senate majority ===
On July 9, Espada announced that he would return to the Democratic conference, which effectively ended the Senate deadlock as Democrats once again had a 32–30 majority. Espada claimed to have a "handshake agreement" with Democratic leader Senator John L. Sampson which would make Espada Senate president for the rest of 2009. Later on the same day, Espada officially became Senate Majority Leader, while Malcolm Smith remained Temporary President of the Senate. Sampson was said to be in line to take over for Smith as Temporary President at an undetermined future date; however, Smith retained hold of the Senate presidency until the end of the term, when control of the chamber passed to the Republicans following the November 2010 elections. Later on July 9, the Senate passed 135 bills in a session that lasted until 2:00 the following morning.

=== Legal battle over Ravitch appointment ===
Republicans attempted to block Ravitch from taking the oath of office by seeking a temporary restraining order. They successfully acquired one shortly after 11 pm, signed by State Supreme Court Justice Ute W. Lally. The Republicans initially thought that this was early enough to prevent Ravitch from entering office, but they later learned that he had already been sworn in. The restraining order prevented Ravitch from taking any actions as Lt. Governor. However, it was vacated the next day, and a hearing to rule on the legality of the appointment was scheduled for the following day, Friday, July 10. At the hearing in the State Supreme Court in Mineola, the judge adjourned matters until July 15.

On July 15, lawyers for Governor Paterson and Senators Skelos and Espada presented their arguments. On July 21, New York Supreme Court Justice William R. LaMarca said that the plaintiffs “have established a likelihood of success on the merits for their claim that neither the Constitution nor legislative enactment authorized the governor to make the appointment," and issued a preliminary injunction which barred Ravitch from carrying out the duties of the office. A new hearing was scheduled for August 25, but lawyers for Governor Paterson filed an appeal in the Appellate Division. The preliminary injunction was stayed by Appellate Division Justice L. Priscilla Hall, who had been appointed to the Appellate Division by Paterson in March 2009.

On July 30, a four-judge panel of the Second Department of the Appellate Division ruled that Ravitch "can continue serving as lieutenant governor pending a legal challenge over his appointment – but he cannot preside over the State Senate." A hearing was held on August 18 before the Appellate Division's Second Dept. in Brooklyn, at which lawyers for both sides presented oral arguments. David Lewis, attorney for Dean Skelos and the Republican Senate caucus, likened the appointment of Ravitch to the Roman Emperor Caligula's naming of his horse to public office. Justice Thomas A. Dickerson said that "there is to be no one who is appointed to take this office." Justice Steven W. Fisher said he expected the Court to rule as soon as possible, referring the case directly to the New York Court of Appeals. On August 20, the Appellate Division rejected the appointment, saying that "the Governor’s purported appointment of Mr. Ravitch was unlawful because no provision of the Constitution or of any statute provides for the filling of a vacancy in the office of lieutenant governor other than by election."

However, on September 22, 2009 the New York Court of Appeals ruled 4–3 that the appointment of Lieutenant Governor Richard Ravitch by Governor David Paterson was constitutional.

=== Aftermath ===
On March 15, 2012, Gov. Andrew Cuomo signed redistricting legislation that added a 63rd State Senate district. Months prior to the passage of the redistricting legislation, the New York Daily News reported that according to Republican sources, adding a 63rd seat "to the current 62-member body would...make political coups like the one that shut down the chamber two years ago more difficult". The Daily News added: "Insiders note that adding a 63rd seat in the state Senate would avoid any legislative chaos by ensuring one party would be in the majority – as opposed to now, with an even number of seats". Following a lawsuit, the New York Court of Appeals upheld the enacted redistricting plan on May 3, 2012.

In the years following the 2009 State Senate leadership crisis, some of the senators involved served prison time. Those senators included Pedro Espada, Hiram Monserrate, and Dean Skelos.

Paterson estimated that the crisis cost the state $125–$150 million in routine taxes that were not collected.

== Notes ==
Political offices
Preceded by Malcolm Smith	Majority Leader of the New York State Senate; 2009	Succeeded by Pedro Espada Jr.
