= Annabel Palma =

American politician

Commissioner and Chair of the New York City Commission on Human Rights
- Incumbent
- Assumed office October 8, 2021
- Mayor: Bill De Blasio; Eric Adams; Zohran Mamdani
- Preceded by: Carmelyn Malalis

Member of the New York City Council from the 18th district
- In office January 1, 2004 – December 31, 2017
- Preceded by: Pedro Espada Jr.
- Succeeded by: Rubén Díaz Sr.

Personal details
- Party: Democratic
- Spouse: Jonathan Palma
- Children: 1
- Education: Monroe College (A.A.)
- Website: Official website

Annabel Palma is an American politician and Commissioner and Chair of the New York City Commission on Human Rights. She previously served on the New York City Council from the 18th district from 2004 to 2017. She is a Democrat. The district includes Castle Hill, Clason Point, Hunts Point, Parkchester, Soundview, West Farms and Westchester Square in The Bronx.

== Life and career ==
Palma is a lifelong resident of The Bronx and attended public schools in the borough before receiving her Certified Nursing Assistant certification from Bronx Community College. She served as a union representative in 1994 while earning an associate degree in Business Administration from Monroe College.

Palma is a resident of Parkchester where she resides with her husband and her son, Jonathan, who is currently a student at John Jay College of Criminal Justice.

== New York City Council ==
In 2003, Palma was elected after defeating incumbent Pedro Espada, Jr. handily in a primary. She would win re-election in 2005, 2009 and 2013 easily.

Palma serves on the Committees on Youth Services, General Welfare, Technology, Land Use, Community Development and the Subcommittee on Landmarks, Public Siting and Maritime Uses, and is a member of the Black, Latino and Asian Caucus and Women's Caucus. She has come under fire for frequent absences from official council duties.

Election history
Location	Year	Election	Results
NYC Council District 18	2003	Democratic Primary	√ Annabel Palma 66.65% Pedro Espada, Jr. 33.36%
NYC Council District 18	2003	General	√ Annabel Palma (D) 83.93% Pedro Espada, Jr. (I) 9.91% Fabian A. Feliciano (R) 4.88% William Newmark (Conservative) 1.28%
NYC Council District 18	2005	General	√ Annabel Palma (D) 89.07% Fabian A. Feliciano (R) 10.07% Albert Lefebvre (Conservative) 0.86%
NYC Council District 18	2009	General	√ Annabel Palma (D) 87.59% Leopold L. Paul (R) 7.93% Walt Nestler (Green) 3.29% Arqui Sanders (Conservative) 1.17%
NYC Council District 18	2013	Democratic Primary	√ Annabel Palma 70.70% William R. Moore 29.30%
NYC Council District 18	2013	General	√ Annabel Palma (D) 89.34% Lamont Paul (R) 3.43% William R. Moore (Jobs & Education) 3.35% Walt Nestler (Green) 1.96% Eduardo Ramirez (Conservative) 1.85%

Political offices
Preceded by Pedro Espada Jr.	New York City Council, 18th district 2004–2017	Succeeded by Rubén Díaz Sr.
