= David Rosado =

American politician

David Rosado (born August 21, 1942) is an American politician from New York.

== Early life and education ==
Rosado was born on August 21, 1942, in Morovis, Puerto Rico. The family moved to New York City where he attended the public schools. He became active in community affairs, and entered politics as a Democrat. He graduated A.A. from Mercy College in 1986.

== Political career ==
On May 1, 1990, Rosado was elected to the New York State Assembly, to fill the vacancy caused by the election of José E. Serrano to the U.S. Congress. He was re-elected twice and remained in the Assembly until 1993, sitting in the 188th, 189th and 190th New York State Legislatures.

In September 1993, Rosado defeated the incumbent City Councilman Rafael Castaneira Colon in the Democratic primary for the seat, after Colon had been indicted for appropriating city council expense money for his personal use. In November 1993, Rosado was elected to the New York City Council. He was a member of the City Council from 1994 to 1996.

In June 1996, the Democratic district organization refused to back the incumbent State Senator Pedro Espada Jr. for re-election, and nominated Rosado instead in the 32nd District. In August 1996, Espada's petition to run in the Democratic primary was rejected by the Appellate Division. In November 1996, Rosado was elected to the State Senate, defeating Espada who ran on the Liberal ticket. Rosado was a member of the New York State Senate from 1997 to 2002, sitting in the 192nd and 193rd New York State Legislatures. In September 2000, he ran for re-nomination in the Democratic primary, but this time was defeated by Espada.

In 2006, Rosado ran on the Republican ticket for the State Assembly seat in the 84th District, but was defeated by the incumbent Democrat Carmen E. Arroyo.

== See also ==
- Nuyorican
- Puerto Ricans in New York City

New York State Assembly
Preceded by José E. Serrano	New York State Assembly; 73rd District; 1990–1992	Succeeded by John Ravitz
Preceded by Hector L. Diaz	New York State Assembly; 74th District; 1993	Succeeded by Carmen E. Arroyo
New York City Council
Preceded by Rafael Castaneira Colon	New York City Council; 17th District; 1994–1996	Succeeded by Federico Perez
New York State Senate
Preceded by Pedro Espada Jr.	New York State Senate; 32nd District; 1997–2000	Succeeded by Pedro Espada Jr.
