= New York City's 18th City Council district =

- Boundaries following the 2020 census

Government
  - Councilmember: Amanda Farías (D—Parkchester)

Population (2010)
  - Total: 169,410

Demographics
  - Hispanic: 58%
  - Black: 30%
  - Asian: 6%
  - White: 3%
  - Other: 3%

Registration
  - Democratic: 76.0%
  - Republican: 4.7%
  - No party preference: 16.5%
- Registered voters (2021) 110,532

New York City's 18th City Council district is one of 51 districts in the New York City Council. It is currently represented by Democrat Amanda Farías, who took office in 2022.

== Geography ==
District 18 is based on the eastern shoreline of the East Bronx, covering Parkchester, Castle Hill, Soundview, and Clason Point. Soundview Park is located within the district.

The district overlaps with Bronx Community Boards 9 and 10, and with New York's 14th and 15th congressional districts. It also overlaps with the 32nd, 33rd, and 34th districts of the New York State Senate, and with the 82nd, 85th, and 87th districts of the New York State Assembly.

== Recent election results ==
=== 2025 ===
2025 New York City Council election, District 18
Party	Candidate	Votes	%
Democratic	Amanda Farías	21,975	
Working Families	Amanda Farías	2,476	
Total	Amanda Farías (incumbent)	24,451	88.0
Republican	Shuvonkar Saha	2,401	8.7
Conservative	Zenobia Merced-Bonilla	582	2.1
United Alliance	Wilfredo Hierrezuelo	289	1.0
Write-in		65	0.2
Total votes		27,788	100.0
Democratic hold			

=== 2023 (redistricting) ===
Due to redistricting and the 2020 changes to the New York City Charter, councilmembers elected during the 2021 and 2023 City Council elections will serve two-year terms, with full four-year terms resuming after the 2025 New York City Council elections.

2023 New York City Council election, District 18
Party	Candidate	Votes	%
Democratic	Amanda Farías	5,648	
Working Families	Amanda Farías	362	
Total	Amanda Farías (incumbent)	6,010	87.8
Republican	Michelle Castillo	775	11.3
Write-in		60	0.9
Total votes		6,845	100.0
Democratic hold			

=== 2021 ===
In 2019, voters in New York City approved Ballot Question 1, which implemented ranked-choice voting in all local elections. Under the new system, voters have the option to rank up to five candidates for every local office. Voters whose first-choice candidates fare poorly will have their votes redistributed to other candidates in their ranking until one candidate surpasses the 50 percent threshold. If one candidate surpasses 50 percent in first-choice votes, then ranked-choice tabulations will not occur.

2021 New York City Council election, District 18 Democratic primary
Party	Candidate	Maximum round	Maximum votes	Share in maximum round	Maximum votes First round votes Transfer votes
Democratic	Amanda Farías	6	6,004	52.3%	
Democratic	William Rivera	6	5,467	47.7%	
Democratic	Michael Beltzer	5	2,079	16.2%	
Democratic	Darlene Jackson	5	1,964	15.3%	
Democratic	Mohammed Mujumder	4	1,768	13.1%	
Democratic	Mirza Rashid	3	732	5.3%	
Democratic	William Russell Moore	2	577	4.1%	
Democratic	Eliu Lara	2	136	1.0%	
Write-in		1	70	0.5%	

An interactive map of District 18

2021 New York City Council election, District 18 general election
Party	Candidate	Votes	%
Democratic	Amanda Farías	10,312	86.7
Republican	Lamont Paul	1,559	13.1
Write-in		25	0.2
Total votes		11,896	100
Democratic hold			

=== 2017 ===
2017 New York City Council election, District 18
Primary election
Party	Candidate	Votes	%
Democratic	Rubén Díaz Sr.	4,017	42.1
Democratic	Amanda Farías	1,991	20.9
Democratic	Elvin García	1,397	14.6
Democratic	Michael Beltzer	1,282	13.4
Democratic	William Russell Moore	842	8.8
Write-in		8	0.1
Total votes		9,537	100
General election
Democratic	Rubén Díaz Sr.	12,473	78.9
Liberal	Michael Beltzer	1,292	8.2
Conservative	Eduardo Ramirez	843	5.3
Reform	William Russell Moore	685	4.3
Green	Carl Lundgren	466	3.0
Write-in		25	0.2
Total votes		15,804	100
Democratic hold			

=== 2013 ===
2013 New York City Council election, District 18
Primary election
Party	Candidate	Votes	%
Democratic	Annabel Palma (incumbent)	6,244	70.7
Democratic	William Russell Moore	2,588	29.3
Write-in		0	0.0
Total votes		8,832	100
General election
Democratic	Annabel Palma	14,161	
Working Families	Annabel Palma	391	
Total	Annabel Palma (incumbent)	14,552	89.3
Republican	Lamont Paul	558	3.4
Jobs & Education	William Russell Moore	546	3.4
Green	Walter Nestler	262	
Progressive	Walter Nestler	57	
Total	Walter Nestler	319	2.0
Conservative	Eduardo Ramirez	302	1.9
Write-in		11	0.1
Total votes		16,288	100
Democratic hold			
