= New York's 32nd State Senate district =

American legislative district

Senator
Luis R. Sepúlveda; D–West Farms
- Registration: 79.6% Democratic; 3.8% Republican; 13.8% No party preference
- Demographics: 2% White; 32% Black; 61% Hispanic; 3% Asian
- Population (2017): 335,653
- Registered voters: 197,095

New York's 32nd State Senate district is one of 63 districts in the New York State Senate. It has been represented by Democrat Luis R. Sepúlveda since his victory in a 2018 special election to replace fellow Democrat Rubén Díaz Sr.

== Geography ==
District 32 is located in the south and central Bronx, including some or all of the neighborhoods of Parkchester, Soundview, West Farms, Hunts Point, Longwood, Concourse, Melrose, Morrisania, Mott Haven, East Tremont, and Westchester Square.

The district overlaps with New York's 14th and 15th congressional districts, and with the 77th, 79th, 82nd, 84th, 85th, and 87th districts of the New York State Assembly.

== Recent election results ==
=== 2026 ===
2026 New York State Senate election, District 32
Party	Candidate	Votes	%
Democratic	Luis Sepúlveda (incumbent)		
Write-in			
Total votes			100.0

=== 2024 ===
2024 New York State Senate election, District 32
Party	Candidate	Votes	%
Democratic	Luis Sepúlveda (incumbent)	45,549	79.0
Republican	Bernadette Stroud	10,749	
Conservative	Bernadette Stroud	1,233	
Total	Bernadette Stroud	11,982	20.8
Write-in		125	0.2
Total votes			100.0
Democratic hold			

=== 2022 ===
2022 New York State Senate election, District 32
Party	Candidate	Votes	%
Democratic	Luis Sepúlveda (incumbent)	23,184	83.2
Republican	Antonio Melendez Sr.	4,053	14.5
Conservative	Dion Powell	599	2.2
Write-in		30	0.1
Total votes		27,866	100.0
Democratic hold			

=== 2020 ===
2020 New York State Senate election, District 32
Primary election
Party	Candidate	Votes	%
Democratic	Luis Sepúlveda (incumbent)	14,846	54.8
Democratic	Pamela Stewart-Martinez	9,069	33.4
Democratic	John Perez	3,122	11.5
Write-in		89	0.3
Total votes		27,126	100.0
General election
Democratic	Luis Sepúlveda (incumbent)	84,128	95.3
Conservative	Jonathon Weiner	3,971	4.5
Write-in		141	0.2
Total votes		88,240	100.0
Democratic hold			

=== 2018 ===
2018 New York State Senate election, District 32
Party	Candidate	Votes	%
Democratic	Luis Sepúlveda	58,019	
Working Families	Luis Sepúlveda	1,130	
Total	Luis Sepúlveda (incumbent)	59,149	94.9
Republican	Patrick Delices	2,183	3.5
Reform	Pamela Stewart-Martinez	566	0.9
Conservative	Migdalia Denis	415	0.7
Write-in		30	0.0
Total votes		62,343	100.0
Democratic hold			

=== 2018 special ===
2018 New York State Senate special election, District 32
Party	Candidate	Votes	%
Democratic	Luis Sepúlveda	3,263	89.4
Reform	Pamela Stewart-Martinez	271	7.4
Republican	Patrick Delices	105	2.9
Write-in		11	0.3
Total votes		3,650	100.0
Democratic hold			

=== 2016 ===
2016 New York State Senate election, District 32
Primary election
Party	Candidate	Votes	%
Democratic	Rubén Díaz Sr. (incumbent)	8,557	88.7
Democratic	Elliot Quinones	1,069	11.1
Write-in		22	0.2
Total votes		9,648	100.0
General election
Democratic	Rubén Díaz Sr. (incumbent)	79,574	97.1
Conservative	Oswald Denis	2,292	2.8
Write-in		107	0.1
Total votes		81,973	100.0
Democratic hold			

=== 2014 ===
2014 New York State Senate election, District 32
Party	Candidate	Votes	%
Democratic	Rubén Díaz Sr.	26,463	
Republican	Rubén Díaz Sr.	1,068	
Total	Rubén Díaz Sr. (incumbent)	27,531	95.9
Conservative	Jasmine Marte	1,153	4.0
Write-in		40	0.1
Total votes		28,724	100.0
Democratic hold			

In 2014, Díaz Sr. also ran on the Republican party line.

=== 2012 ===
2012 New York State Senate election, District 32
Party	Candidate	Votes	%
Democratic	Rubén Díaz Sr.	70,788	
Republican	Rubén Díaz Sr.	1,565	
Conservative	Rubén Díaz Sr.	597	
Total	Rubén Díaz Sr. (incumbent)	72,950	97.1
Independence	David Johnson	2,188	2.9
Write-in		18	0.0
Total votes		75,156	100.0
Democratic hold			

=== Federal results in District 32 ===
Year	Office	Results
2020	President	Biden 87.4 – 11.8%
2016	President	Clinton 93.5 – 5.2%
2012	President	Obama 96.7 – 3.1%
2012	Senate	Gillibrand 96.9 – 2.7%
