= Parkchester, Bronx =

Neighborhood in New York City

Parkchester
- Neighborhood of the Bronx
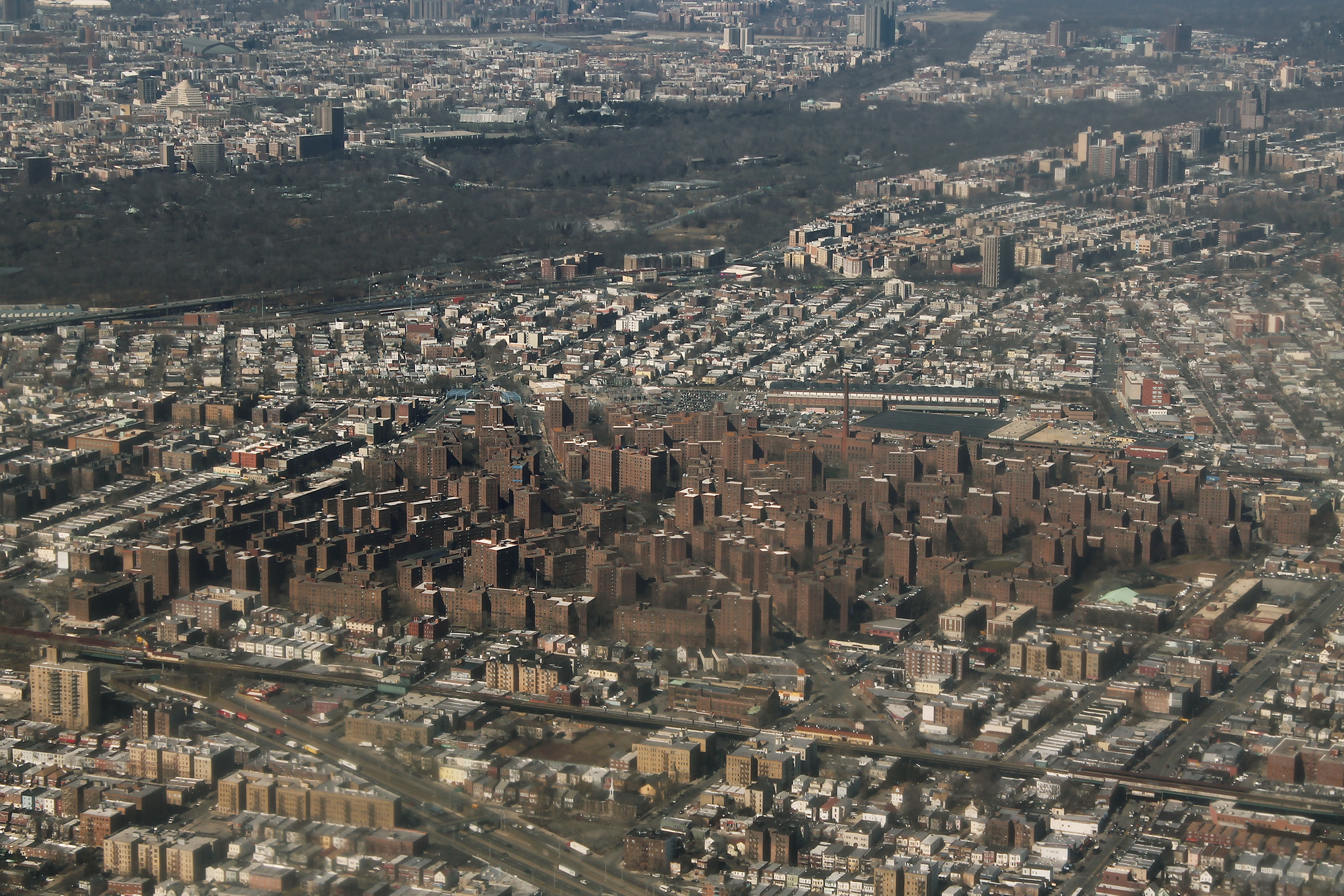
- The towers-in-the-park layout of Parkchester
- Interactive map of Parkchester
- Coordinates: 40.839°N 73.86°W
- Country: United States
- State: New York
- City: New York City
- Borough: The Bronx
- Community District: The Bronx 9

Area
  - Total: 0.329 sq mi (0.85 km^{2})

Population (2020)
  - Total: 33,602
  - Density: 102,000/sq mi (39,400/km^{2})

Economics
  - Median income: $61,261

Ethnicity
  - Hispanic: 33.0%
  - Black: 35.1%
  - White: 2.7%
  - Asian: 25.4%
  - Others: 3.8%
- ZIP Codes: 10462, 10460, 10461
- Area code: 718, 347, 929, and 917
- Website: www.parkchesternyc.com

Parkchester is a planned community and neighborhood originally developed by the Metropolitan Life Insurance Company and located in the east Bronx, New York City. The immediate surrounding area also takes its name from the complex. Its boundaries, starting from the north and moving clockwise, are East Tremont Avenue to the north, Castle Hill Avenue to the east, Westchester Avenue to the south, East 177th Street/Cross Bronx Expressway to the southwest, and White Plains Road to the west. Metropolitan Avenue, Unionport Road, and White Plains Road are the primary thoroughfares through Parkchester.

The neighborhood is part of Bronx Community District 9 and is mostly located within ZIP Code 10462, with small sections in 10460 and 10461. The 6 and <6> trains of the New York City Subway operate along Westchester Avenue. The neighborhood is patrolled by the New York City Police Department's 43rd Precinct. The privately owned housing complex is patrolled by the Parkchester Department of Public Safety.

== History ==
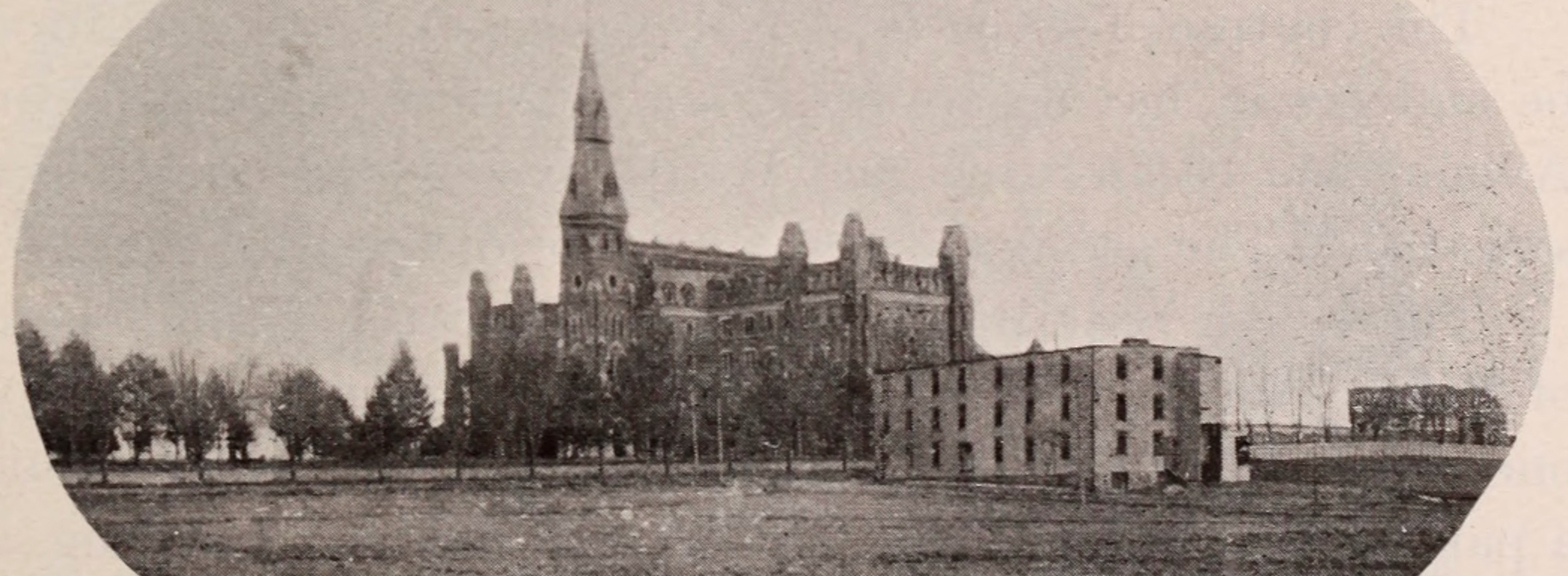
An 1897 view of the Roman Catholic Protectory on the future site of Parkchester

The housing development has the same origins as Stuyvesant Town–Peter Cooper Village, and Riverton Houses in Manhattan, which were also originally developed and owned by MetLife. The name was later unofficially applied to the entire neighborhood surrounding the apartment complex. The name "Parkchester" itself was derived from the two neighborhoods on each side of the site of the housing development — Park Versailles and Westchester Heights.

MetLife displayed an intricate scale model of the proposed development at the 1939 New York World's Fair. The model showed all of the buildings and facilities, and was accurate down to inclusion of each of the 66,000 windows in the complex. The 51 groups of buildings were planned to house 12,000 families.

The Parkchester residential development was originally designed and operated as a self-contained rental community for middle-class white families new to home ownership. MetLife chairman Frederick H. Ecker said that Black renters were excluded because "Negroes and whites don't mix."

It was built from 1939 to 1942 (despite emergency building restrictions during World War II) on the farmland of the New York Catholic Protectory, a home for orphaned and troubled boys conducted by the Brothers of the Christian Schools, which relocated to Lincolndale, Westchester County, where it still exists. Macy's opened their first branch store after their 34th Street flagship store in Parkchester in 1941.

The Fair Housing Act, enacted in April 1968, prohibited discrimination in renting, which, along with mounting pressure from the NAACP and other groups, forced a change in policy. In the face of charges by the New York City Commission on Human Rights that Metropolitan Life had been engaging in "deliberate, intentional and systematic" racial discrimination and claims that Parkchester had rented only 25 apartments to Black or Hispanic tenants in its history, Metropolitan Life agreed to open rentals without considering racial backgrounds at Parkchester and its other apartment complexes.

In 1974, approximately one-third of the complex was converted to condominiums, with the remaining portion, now Parkchester South Condominium converted later, in 1986. The complex is best known for its broad, tree-lined walkways between the distinctive red-brown buildings, and for its Works Progress Administration-style terracotta decorations on the buildings, that represent animal and human figures of many types. Many of these are the work of sculptor Joseph Kiselewski.

In 2015 Parkchester celebrated its 75th anniversary with a family event on the Parkchester North Ball Field.

In August 2024, the New York City Council voted to rezone 46 city blocks in Parkchester, Van Nest, and Morris Park, around the Metro-North Railroad's Parkchester/Van Nest and Morris Park stations, as part of the Penn Station Access project. The city government also promised to spend $500 million on infrastructure upgrades around these stations. The rezoning was intended to encourage development around these stations. As a result, up to 7,000 housing units could be constructed in the three neighborhoods.

== Demographics ==
Based on data from the 2020 United States Census, the population of the Parkchester neighborhood tabulation area was 33,602, an increase of 3,781 (12.7%) from the 29,821 counted in 2010. Covering an area of 210.76 acres (85.29 ha), the neighborhood had a population density of 159.6 inhabitants per acre (102,100/sq mi; 39,400/km^{2}).

The racial makeup of the neighborhood was 35.1% (11,788) African American, 25.4% (8,550) Asian, 2.7% (907) Non-Hispanic White, 1.4% (479) from other races, and 2.4% (795) from two or more races. Hispanic or Latino of any race were 33.0% (11,083) of the population.

The Parkchester apartment complex has a total residential population over 25,000 and a population density over 125,000 people per sq mi. It includes a significant South Asian population: Pakistani, Bangladeshi, Indian, including Catholics, Muslims, and Hindus. There are also a number of Italian, Polish, Irish, Eritrean and Albanian residents. Asian residents include Thais, Chinese, Japanese, Vietnamese, Filipinos, Burmese, and Cambodians. Parkchester also is home to a large and longstanding population of Puerto Ricans, like Luis R. Sepulveda who represents the area in the New York State Assembly and has his office on Westchester Avenue. Parkchester has one of the highest concentrations of Puerto Ricans in New York City, as is it situated between Soundview and Castle Hill, which are also notable for having a significantly denser Puerto Rican population in comparison to other parts of the Bronx or the city as a whole. While the population is approximately over 38% African American and 30% Latino, the complex once had a whites-only policy. The resident population of the Parkchester apartment complex reflects a broad age distribution and the changing ethnic makeup of the Bronx.

The entirety of Bronx Community District 9, which comprises Bronx River, Castle Hill, Clason Point, Harding Park, Parkchester, Soundview, and Unionport, had 188,249 inhabitants with an average life expectancy of 79.7 years. This is about the same as the median life expectancy of 81.2 for all New York City neighborhoods. Most inhabitants are youth and middle-aged adults: 25% are between the ages of between 0–17, 29% between 25–44, and 24% between 45–64. The ratio of college-aged and elderly residents was lower, at 10% and 12% respectively.

As of 2017, the median household income in Bronx Community District 9 was $40,005.

In 2018, an estimated 26% of Bronx Community District 9 residents lived in poverty, compared to 25% in all of the Bronx and 20% in all of New York City. One in eight residents (13%) were unemployed, compared to 13% in the Bronx and 9% in New York City. Rent burden, or the percentage of residents who have difficulty paying their rent, is 55% in Bronx Community District 9, compared to the boroughwide and citywide rates of 58% and 51% respectively. Based on this calculation, as of 2018, Bronx Community District 9 is considered low-income relative to the rest of the city and not gentrifying.

== Land use ==
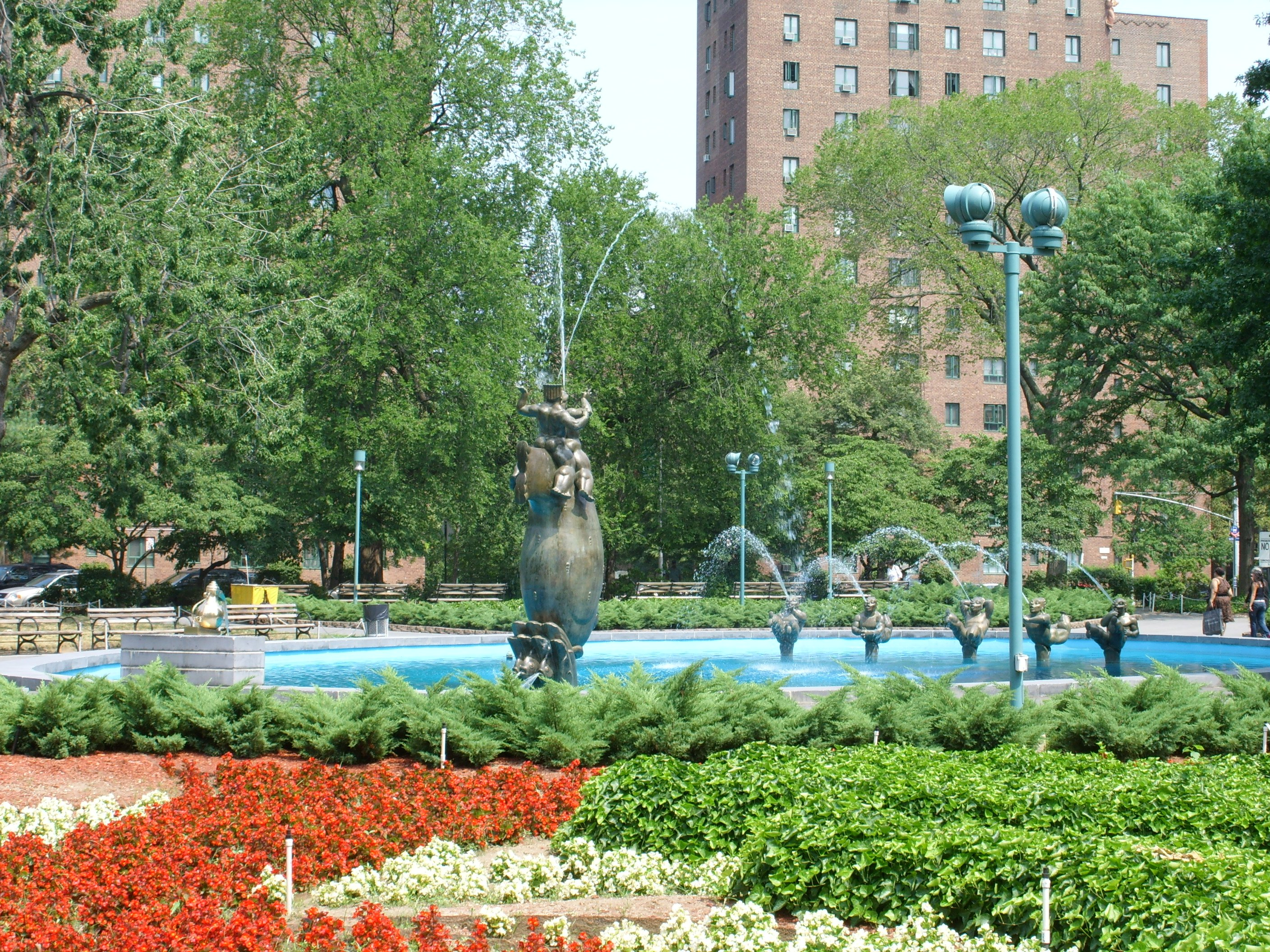
Aileen B. Ryan Oval, formerly Metropolitan Oval

The Parkchester complex is composed of 171 four-sided brick buildings, either eight or 13 stories in height and numbered M (for Main) through 7 and M through 12, respectively. The 13 story buildings have dual elevators positioned side-by-side, while the eight-story buildings only have one. Some buildings even have Terrace-level apartments that are located on the ground floor and noted by the T in front of the apartment letter, i.e., TA, TB, etc. These apartments differ from all others in the community in that they have an additional screened door in the living room section of the apartment that leads out onto a concrete patio where tenants usually put patio/lawn furniture.

The surrounding area, commonly referred to as "Parkchester", is dominated by multi-unit buildings unrelated to Parkchester complex. 78.4% of housing units are renter occupied. Retail locations are interspersed throughout the neighborhood as well as along Starling Avenue, McGraw Avenue, Metropolitan Avenue, Tremont Avenue, Unionport Road, and White Plains Road; the latter four streets are considered the backbones of the area.

Points of interest include:

- American Theater, formerly Loews American, established in 1939, operated by Bow Tie Cinemas as a seven-screen multiplex until it closed in 2013. Converted to a Marshall's store.
- Macy's Department Store, with 175,000 square feet (16,300 m^{2}) of selling space, opened in October 1941 as the company's first branch store.
- Zaro's Bakery, established in 1959, temporarily closed in 2015, reopened in 2017 close to its original location.

A prominent feature of Parkchester is the Bangla Bazaar located throughout Olmstead Avenue, Odell Street, Purdy Street, and Castle Hill Avenue. The long stretch of blocks are occupied by businesses owned by Bangladeshis.

There are two subsections of the neighborhood. Parkchester Apartment Complex is a subsection of Parkchester. Its boundaries, starting from the north and moving clockwise, are East Tremont Avenue to the north, Castle Hill Avenue to the east, McGraw Avenue to the south, and White Plains Road to the west. The apartment complex has recently undergone substantial renovations of many of their apartments. Additionally, Stratton Park is on the west part of Parkchester. Its boundaries, starting from the north and moving clockwise, are the Amtrak Northeast Corridor to the west and north, White Plains Road to the east, and East 177th Street (the Cross-Bronx Expressway service road) to the south. Its ZIP code is 10460, and its residents consider themselves as part of Parkchester.

At the heart of Parkchester is the 2 acres (0.81 ha) Aileen B. Ryan Oval, formerly Metropolitan Oval.

=== Artwork ===
Parkchester was designed with aesthetics in mind as evidenced by intricate patterns of brickwork and architectural ornaments. The development contains 500 terra cotta statuettes and 600 plaques, and depict a wide array of figures, including bullfighters, soldiers, mermaids, and Native American chiefs, and animals, including gazelles, puffins, kangaroos, and bears. Sculptures were largely provided by the Federal Seaboard Terra Cotta Corporation. Among the nine sculptors on the project were Raymond Granville Barger, Joseph Kiselewski, Carl Schmitz and Theodore Barbarossa. Their sculptures adorn the entrances and can also be seen high on the corners of the taller buildings. Some are polychromatic, painted in bright colors, and some figures appear within rondels. In the Aileen B. Ryan Oval, a fountain named Fantasia, created by Barger, was installed in 1941 and is often the backdrop of photographs. The former Loew's American Theater is ornamented with figures of two harlequins in the front and a matador, hula girl, flamenco dancer, and other figures in the rear.

Approximately 45 of the sculptures were removed from 2018 to 2021; a campaign by history preservationists and architectural historians has launched to preserve the Parkchester sculptures.

=== Police and crime ===
Parkchester and the rest of Bronx Community District 9 is patrolled by the 43rd Precinct of the NYPD, located at 900 Fteley Avenue. As of 2018, with a non-fatal assault hospitalization rate of 100 per 100,000 people, the 43rd Precinct's rate of violent crimes per capita is more than that of the city as a whole. The incarceration rate of 603 per 100,000 people is higher than that of the city as a whole.

The 43rd Precinct has a lower crime rate than in the 1990s, with crimes across all categories having decreased by 63.1% between 1990 and 2022. The precinct reported 6 murders, 48 rapes, 747 robberies, 806 felony assaults, 302 burglaries, 1,039 grand larcenies, and 561 grand larcenies auto in 2022.

=== Public Safety ===
In 2022 Parkchester public safety officers became Special Patrolmen and amended their uniforms and logo to match such change. They continued their function and responsibilities as before but are using a new name Parkchester (Police). They employ 100 officers who are special patrolmen as listed and defined by their website. special patrolmen have very limited peace officer authority in connection with their special assignment of employment pursuant to New York State Criminal Procedure Law § 2.10 sub 27 and parkcheaster management policies. The exercise of this authority is limited to the employee's geographical area of employment and only while such employee is working as defined in Chapter 13 subsection (C):.. all special patrolmen are prohibited to represent themself as a Police Officer as listed and defined in Special partolmen chapter 13 section 13-05 (conduct) and new york state penal law 190.25. Special patrolmen are required to comply with the New York City Police Department's rules and requirements to receive special patrolman status. Parkchester special patrolmen are issued a pistol license by the New York City Police Department and carry a firearm while performing their assignment only.

The New York City Police Department is the primary policing and investigation agency within New York City as per the NYC Charter, which includes Parkchester.

=== Fire safety ===
Parkchester is served by the New York City Fire Department (FDNY)'s Engine Co. 64/Ladder Co. 47 fire station at 1224 Castle Hill Avenue.

== Health ==
As of 2018, preterm births and births to teenage mothers are more common in Parkchester and Clason Point than in other places citywide. In Parkchester and Clason Point, there were 106 preterm births per 1,000 live births (compared to 87 per 1,000 citywide), and 26.4 births to teenage mothers per 1,000 live births (compared to 19.3 per 1,000 citywide). Parkchester and Clason Point has a relatively average population of residents who are uninsured. In 2018, this population of uninsured residents was estimated to be 16%, higher than the citywide rate of 14%.

The concentration of fine particulate matter, the deadliest type of air pollutant, in Parkchester and Clason Point is 0.0076 milligrams per cubic metre (7.6×10^{−9} oz/ft^{3}), more than the city average. Eighteen percent of Parkchester and Clason Point residents are smokers, which is higher than the city average of 14% of residents being smokers. In Parkchester and Clason Point, 32% of residents are obese, 16% are diabetic, and 34% have high blood pressure—compared to the citywide averages of 24%, 11%, and 28% respectively. In addition, 25% of children are obese, compared to the citywide average of 20%.

83% of residents eat some fruits and vegetables every day, which is less than the city's average of 87%. In 2018, 72% of residents described their health as "good", "very good", or "excellent", lower than the city's average of 78%. For every supermarket in Parkchester and Clason Point, there are 13 bodegas.

The nearest hospital campuses are Montefiore Medical Center's Westchester Square and West Farms campuses, as well as the Longwood campus of the BronxCare Hospital System.

=== Notable incidents ===
In 2006, an outbreak of Legionnaires' disease was responsible for the deaths of six Parkchester residents. Although a fountain located in the Metropolitan Oval and featuring a whimsical bronze sculpture by Raymond Granville Barger was initially suspected as the source of the outbreak, New York City health officials later determined that it was linked to infected cooling towers in the area.

== Post office and ZIP Codes ==
Parkchester is located within multiple ZIP Codes. The housing development proper is part of 10462, but the areas to the immediate west are located in 10460, and the immediate east, in 10461. The United States Postal Service's Parkchester Station is located at 1449 West Avenue.

== Education ==
Parkchester and Clason Point generally have a similar rate of college-educated residents to the rest of the city as of 2018. While 23% of residents age 25 and older have a college education or higher, 30% have less than a high school education and 47% are high school graduates or have some college education. By contrast, 26% of Bronx residents and 43% of city residents have a college education or higher. The percentage of Parkchester and Clason Point students excelling in math rose from 23% in 2000 to 44% in 2011, and reading achievement increased from 27% to 30% during the same time period.

Parkchester and Clason Point's rate of elementary school student absenteeism is higher than the rest of New York City. In Parkchester and Clason Point, 28% of elementary school students missed twenty or more days per school year, more than the citywide average of 20%. Additionally, 69% of high school students in Parkchester and Clason Point graduate on time, lower than the citywide average of 75%.

=== Schools ===
- PS 106, a public elementary school located at 2120 St. Raymond Avenue for grades 1–5.
- MS 127, the Castle Hill Middle School, a public middle school situated on St Raymond Avenue and Purdy Street, that educates students in grades 6–8. Formerly a troubled school known as JHS 127, it is now split into 7 different learning communities in order for students to get higher grades.
- St. Raymond Elementary School, a private elementary school and middle school situated on Purdy Street; it educates students in pre-kindergarten to grade 8.
- St. Raymond Academy for Girls, a private high school situated on Castle Hill Avenue, that educates students in grades 9–12.
- St. Raymond High School for Boys, a private high school situated on St Raymond Avenue, that educates students in grades 9–12.
- St. Helena Elementary, a private pre-school, elementary school, and middle school situated on Benedict Avenue that educates students from pre-k to 8th grade.
- Bronx Charter School for Excellence, a charter school located on Benedict Avenue that educates students from kindergarten to 8th grade.

=== Library ===
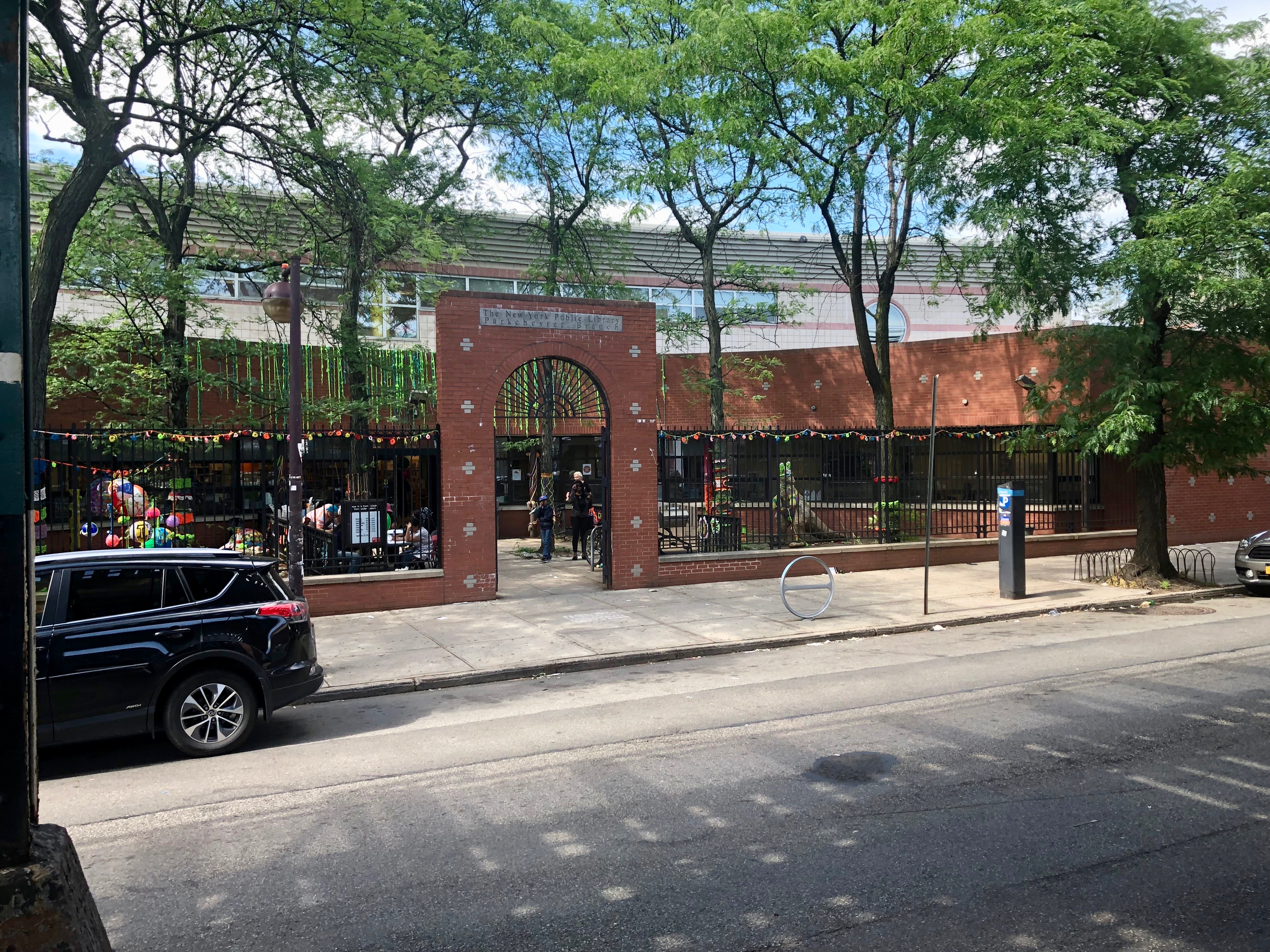
Parkchester Library Branch

The New York Public Library (NYPL)'s Parkchester branch is located at 1985 Westchester Avenue. The branch opened in 1942 within the Parkchester development and moved to its current two-story structure in 1985.

== Transportation ==
The following MTA Regional Bus Operations bus routes serve Parkchester:

- Bx4: to Westchester Square (6 train) or Third Avenue-149th Street (2 and 5 trains) (via Westchester Avenue)
- Bx4A: to Westchester Square (6 train) or Simpson Street (2 and 5 trains) (via Westchester Avenue and Metropolitan Oval)
- Bx11: to George Washington Bridge Bus Terminal (via 170th Street, Claremont Parkway, 174th Street)
- Bx22: to Bedford Park (Bronx High School of Science) or Castle Hill (via Castle Hill Avenue and Unionport Road)
- Bx36: to Castle Hill or George Washington Bridge Bus Terminal (via Tremont Avenue and White Plains Road)
- Bx39: to Wakefield – 241st Street subway station or Clason's Point (via White Plains Road)
- Bx40: to SUNY Maritime College or Morris Heights (via 180th Street and Tremont-Burnside Avenues)
- Bx42: to Throgs Neck or Morris Heights (via 180th Street and Tremont-Burnside Avenues)
- Q44 SBS: to Jamaica or West Farms (via East 177th Street, the Cross Bronx Expressway service roads) and Main Street)
- BxM6: express to Midtown Manhattan (via Metropolitan Avenue)

The following New York City Subway station serves Parkchester:

- Parkchester (6 and <6> trains)
- Castle Hill Avenue (6 and <6> trains)
- Parkchester/Van Nest station is a planned Metro-North Railroad station on the New Haven Line, which is intended to open in late 2027 as part of the Metropolitan Transportation Authority’s Penn Station Access project. Located on the border of Van Nest on Tremont Avenue and just north of Parkchester’s border on White Plains Road, the station would provide commuter rail service to New York Penn Station in Midtown Manhattan and to stations in Connecticut and Westchester County. The entrance would be located on Tremont Avenue.

== In popular culture ==
- Parkchester was the filming location for part of the Sporty Thievz 1999 video "No Pigeons". Extras were featured circling a red car parked in front of the Loews American (later known as just the American) theater on East Avenue.
- Parkchester was featured in the film Doubt (2008), during the scene when Sr. Aloysius is walking with Mrs. Miller behind the building located at 2051 St. Raymond Avenue.

== Notable people ==
- Claudette Colvin (1939–2026), civil rights icon
- Jim Larrañaga (born 1949), head coach for the Miami Hurricanes men's basketball team
- Alexandria Ocasio-Cortez (born 1989), U.S. Representative
- George A. Romero (1940–2017), filmmaker
- Claudia Goldin, Nobel laureate

== See also ==
- Cooperative Village
- Towers in the park
- Co-op City
- LeFrak City
- Marcus Garvey Village
- Mitchell Lama
- Parkfairfax, Virginia
- Parkmerced, San Francisco
- Park La Brea, Los Angeles
- Penn South
- Riverton Houses
- Rochdale Village, Queens
- Starrett City, Brooklyn
- Stuyvesant Town–Peter Cooper Village
