= Schuylerville, Bronx =

Neighborhood in New York City

Schuylerville
- Neighborhood of the Bronx
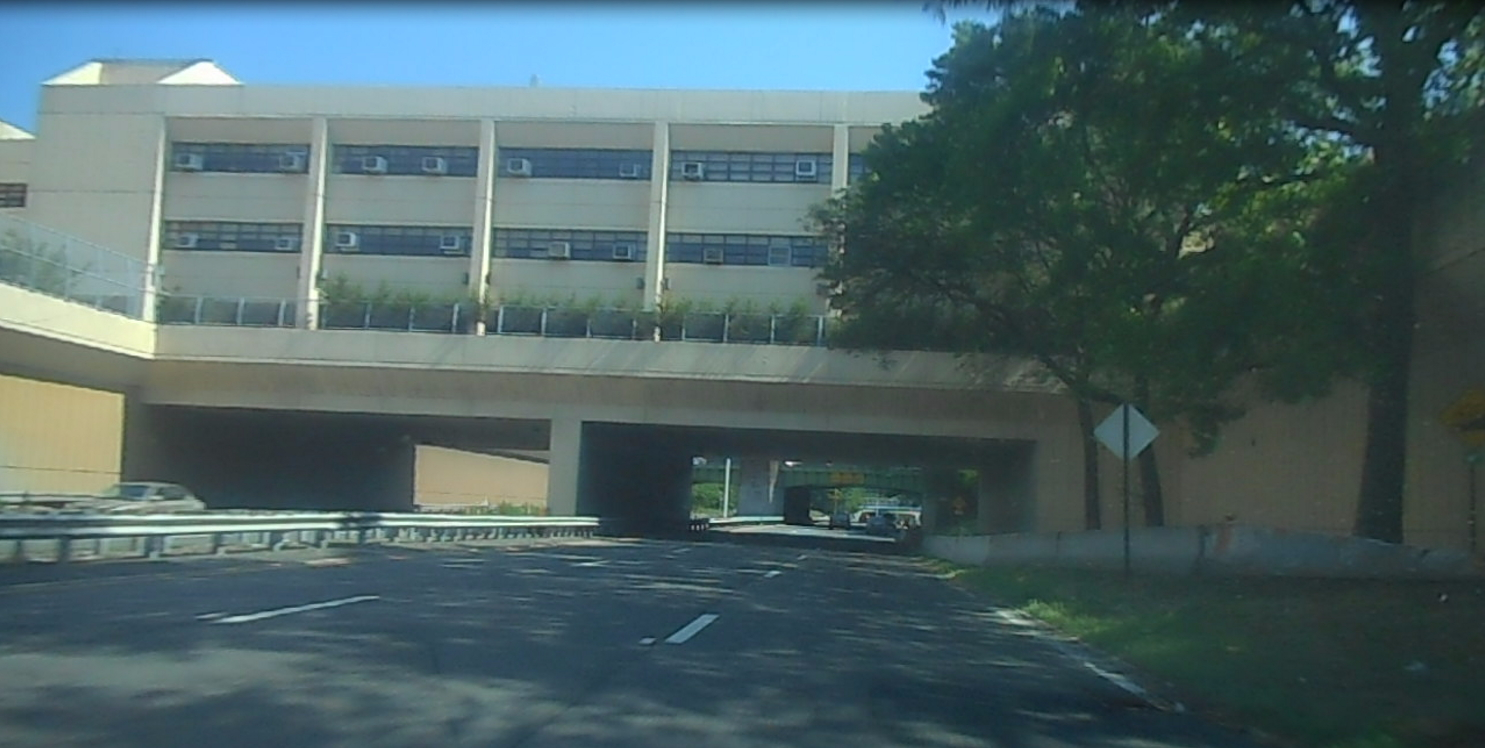
- The Herbert H. Lehman High School over the Hutchinson River Parkway in Schuylerville
- Location in New York City
- Coordinates: 40.835°N 73.833°W
- Country: United States
- State: New York
- City: New York City
- Borough: The Bronx
- Community District: Bronx 10

Area
  - Total: 0.682 sq mi (1.77 km^{2})

Population (2011)
  - Total: 12,025
  - Density: 17,600/sq mi (6,810/km^{2})

Economics
  - Median income: $87,253
- Time zone: UTC−05:00 (Eastern (EST))
  - Summer (DST): UTC−04:00 (Eastern (EDT))
- ZIP Codes: 10461, 10465
- Area code: 718, 347, 929, and 917
- Website: www.schuylerville.nyc

Schuylerville (nicknamed "Skyville") is a middle-class neighborhood located in the East Bronx area of New York City. Housing is mostly single-family and two-family houses. It is located next to other middle-to-upper-class residential neighborhoods of Country Club and Pelham Bay.

Schuylerville is a small enclave situated between the Bruckner Expressway and the Hutchinson River Parkway, with suburban style. It is a predominantly Italian neighborhood, with small Hispanic and black populations. Saint Raymond's Cemetery is in the southwestern part. Since the rise of the housing market the neighborhood has seen various luxury developments, including condos and newly built two-family houses.

Officially, it is considered part of the Throggs Neck section of the East Bronx. However, it is closer to and associated with the Pelham Bay and Country Club sections of the Bronx. One of the largest public parks in New York City, Pelham Bay Park, is located nearby, as well as Orchard Beach.

== Demographics ==
Schuylerville has a population of around 10,121 people, and according to 2012 figures it had a median household income of $68,943 compared to $32,893 for the whole Bronx borough. The population is around 45% white and 45% Hispanic, the rest being a mix of blacks and Asians.

== Transportation ==
The following MTA Regional Bus Operations bus routes serve Schuylerville:

- Bx5: to Co-op City and Bay Plaza Shopping Center or Simpson Street (2 and 5 trains) (via Story Avenue)
- Bx8: to 225th Street (2 and 5 trains) or Locust Point (via Williamsbridge Road)
- Bx40/42: to Morris Heights or Throggs Neck (via Tremont-Burnside Avenues)
- Q50: to Flushing, Queens or Co-op City

The IRT Pelham Line of the New York City Subway (6 and <6> trains) serves Schuylerville via the Pelham Bay Park, Buhre Avenue, and Middletown Road stations.
