= Locust Point =

Locust Point may refer to a location in the United States:

- Locust Point, Baltimore, Maryland, a neighborhood
- Locust Point, Bronx, New York, a neighborhood
- Locust, New Jersey, originally named Locust Point, an unincorporated area
