= Bx23 and Q50 buses =

Bus routes in New York City

bx23 q50 ltd
- Pelham Bay−Co-op City; Flushing–Bronx; Former QBx1
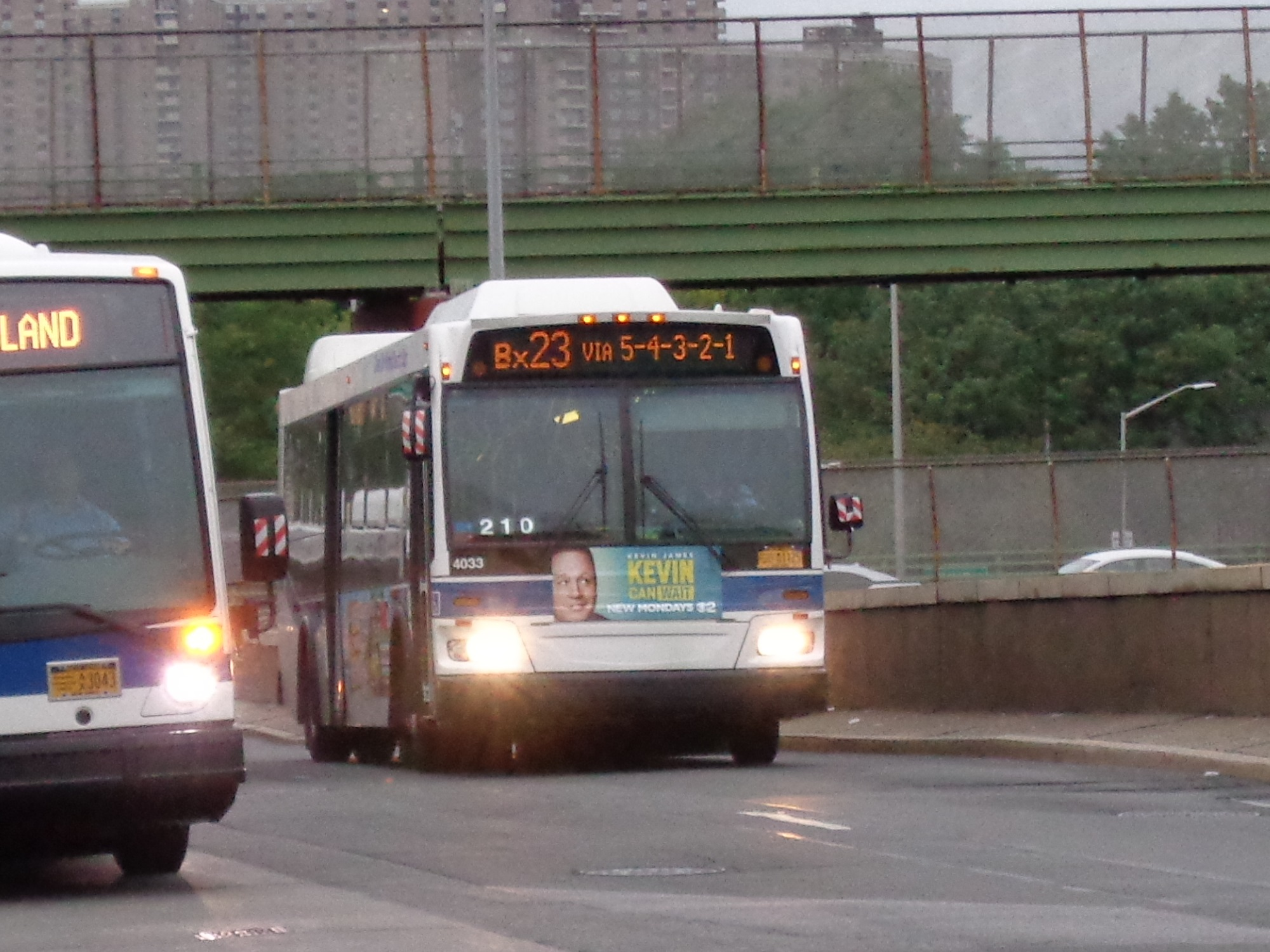
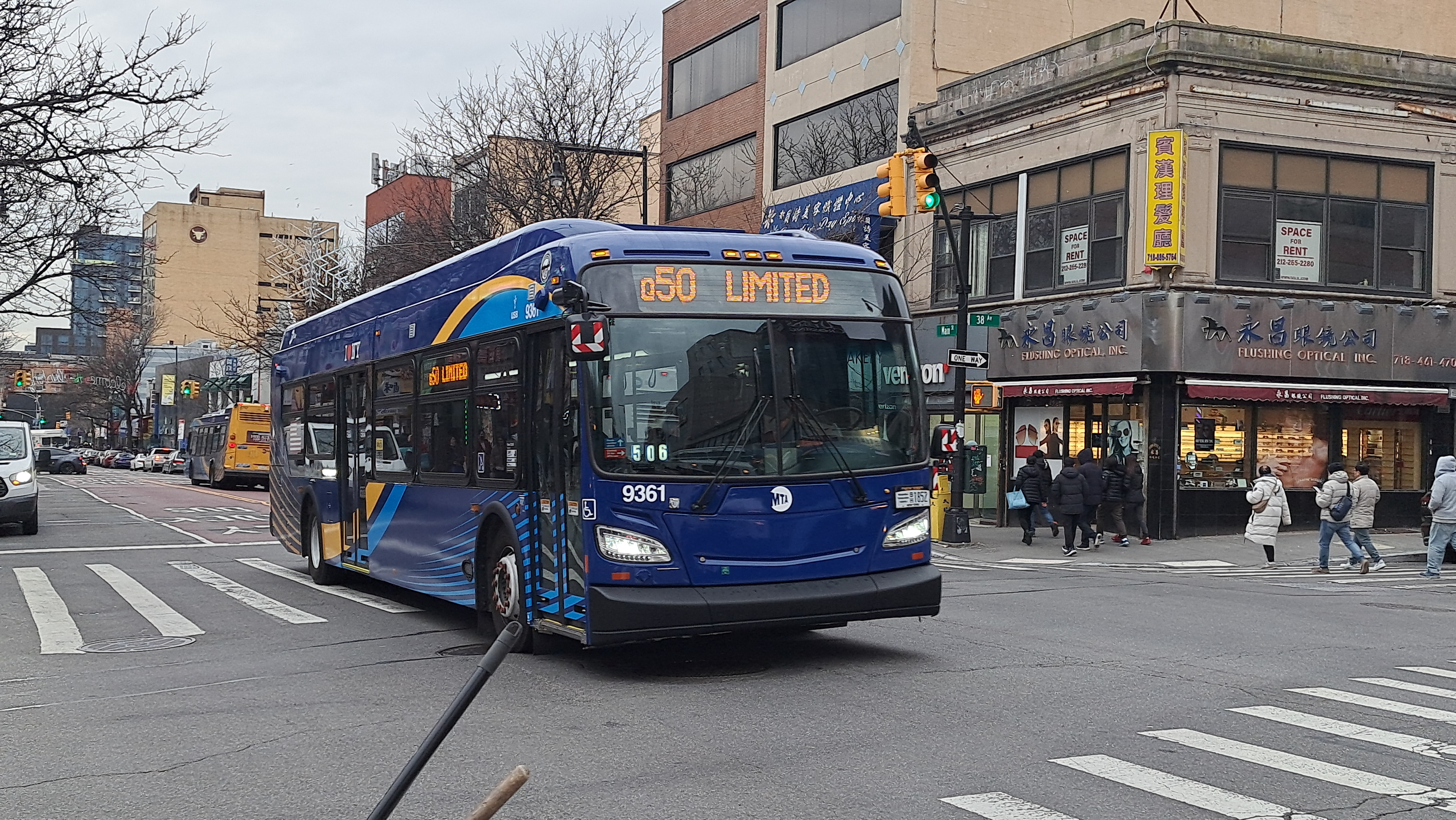
- A 2009 Orion VII NG HEV (4033) on the Bx23 in Co-Op City and a 2023 XD40 (9361) on the Q50 Limited in Flushing.

Overview
- System: MTA Regional Bus Operations
- Operator: MTA Bus Company
- Garage: Eastchester Depot
- Vehicle: New Flyer Xcelsior XD40
- Began service: September 12, 2010 (Bx23 & Q50)

Route
- Locale: The Bronx and Queens, New York, U.S.
- Start: Q50: Flushing, Queens – 39th Avenue / Main Street station Bx23: Pelham Bay, Bronx – Pelham Bay Park station
- Via: Co-op City Boulevard; Q50: Bruckner Boulevard, Bronx–Whitestone Bridge
- End: Co-op City, Bronx; Bx23: Via Sections 1-2-3-4-5 or 5-4-3-2-1, (Note: The sections are: Section 1 is the northwestern section, north of Harry Truman High School.; Section 2 is the northeastern section, east of Harry Truman High School.; Section 3 is the western section, west of Bartow Mall Shopping Center.; Section 4 is the eastern section, east of Bartow Mall Shopping Center.; Section 5 is the southeastern section, east and south of the Hutchinson River Parkway.) then returns to Pelham Bay; Q50: Section 5 – Earhart Lane and Erskine Place (Early weekday mornings and rush hours): Q50 off-peak terminates at Pelham Bay Park station
- Length: Q50: 12.2 miles (19.6 km); Bx23: 6.3 miles (10.1 km)

Service
- Operates: All times except late nights (Bx23); 24 hours (Q50)
- Annual patronage: Q50: 856,662 (2025); Bx23: 740,336 (2025)
- Transfers: Yes
- Timetable: Bx23 Q50

The Bx23 and Q50 bus routes constitute a public transit corridor in New York City, running from the Flushing neighborhood in Queens to the Pelham Bay and Co-op City neighborhoods in the Bronx. The Bx23 provides local service in Pelham Bay and Co-op City, while the Q50 provides limited-stop service between Co-op City and subway hubs in Pelham Bay and Flushing. Both routes are city-operated under the MTA Bus Company brand of MTA Regional Bus Operations, and are the only two local routes in the Bronx to operate under the MTA Bus brand, rather than under the MaBSTOA brand that all other local bus routes in the Bronx operate under.

The two routes are the successor to the QBx1 route, privately operated by the Queens Surface Corporation until 2005, when the route was taken over by the MTA. This route ran several confusing service patterns between Co-op City and Pelham Bay, with only select runs continuing to Flushing. In September 2010, to simplify service in the Bronx and to provide full-time service between Queens and the Bronx, the QBx1 was split into the Bx23 and Q50.

== Route description and service ==
=== Former QBx1 ===
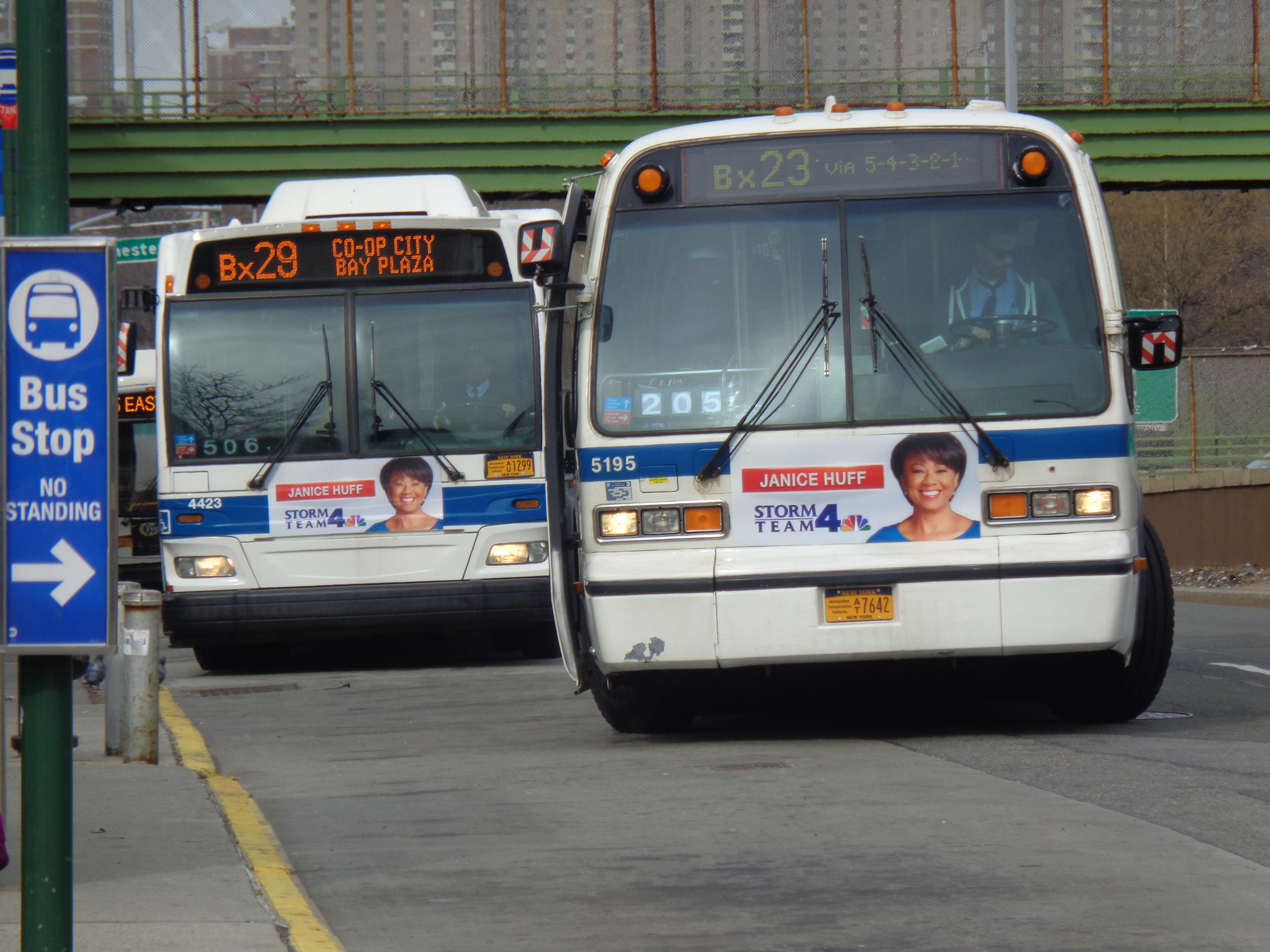
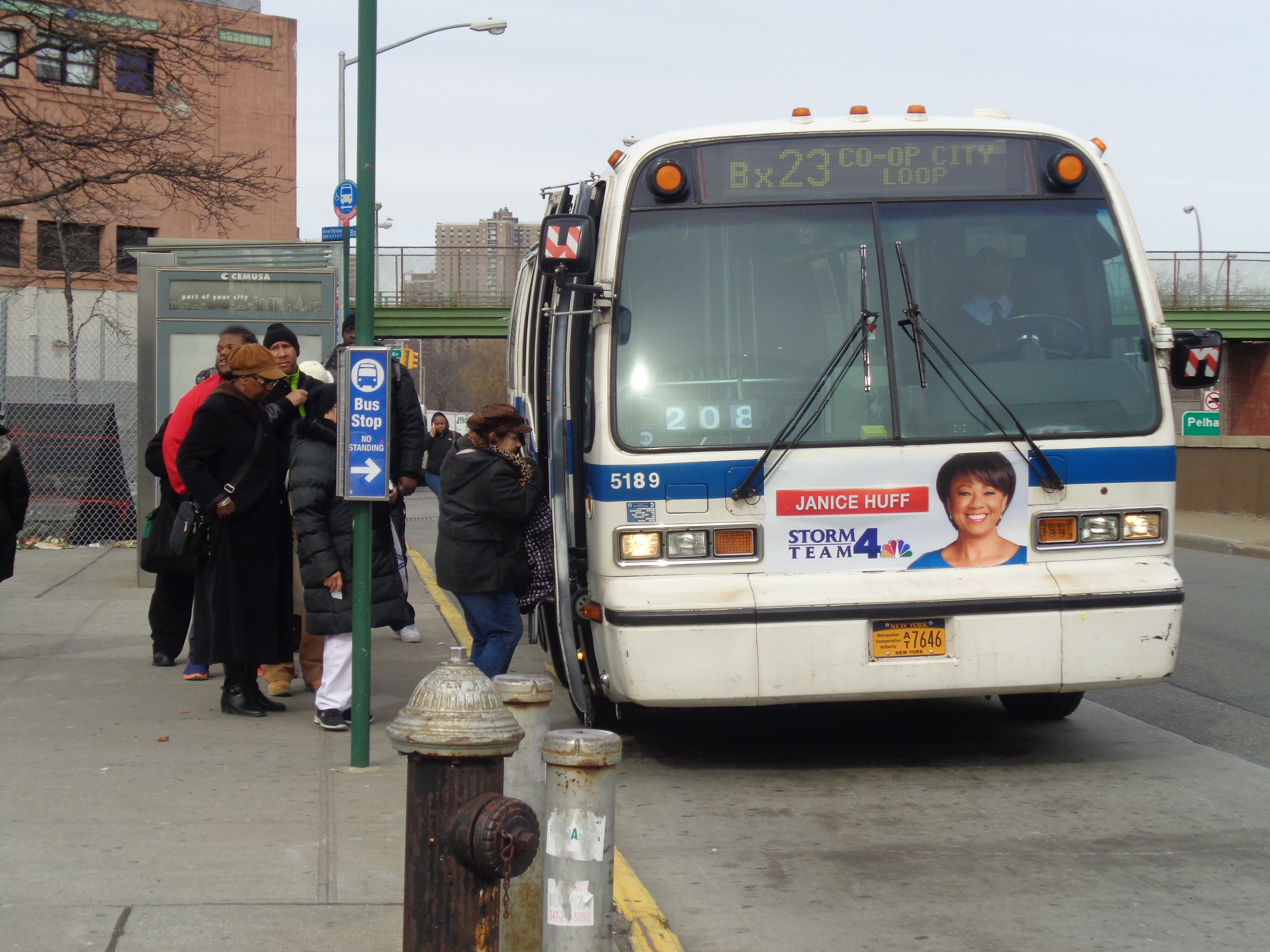
Two 1999 Nova Bus RTS-06s on the Bx23; one running in the 5-4-3-2-1 pattern (5195; top) and one running in the 1-2-3-4-5 pattern (5189; bottom) in Co-Op City, at Bruckner Blvd/Pelham Bay Park.

The original QBx1 service began at the Flushing–Main Street subway station in Downtown Flushing, Queens (within a section of Flushing also known as Flushing Chinatown). It ran north on Main Street to Northern Boulevard, then east to Linden Place. It then ran north on Linden Place to the Whitestone Expressway, sharing the street with the Q25 and former Q34. The QBx1 proceeded north on the Whitestone Expressway service road and then onto the Bronx–Whitestone Bridge crossing into the Bronx, and then onto the Hutchinson River Parkway service road to Lafayette Avenue. This portion of the route across the bridge to Bruckner Boulevard was shared with the Q44, the only other local bus between the Bronx and Queens. At the Bruckner Interchange, the QBx1 turned onto Bruckner Boulevard (the Bruckner Expressway service road), traveling east then north to the Pelham Bay Park subway station. This section is shared with the Bx5. Only selected buses ran between Flushing and Pelham Bay; most QBx1 runs remained in the Bronx.

North of Pelham Bay Park, the QBx1 ran several different services to different parts of Co-op City. The full route circumscribed the entire development, running (clockwise) north along the New England Thruway service road to Bartow Avenue (near the current Bay Plaza Shopping Center), through Section 1, via the Dreiser Loop, through Sections 2 and 3, via the Asch Loop in Section 4, and through Section 5 before returning to Pelham Bay. This pattern operated clockwise (sections 1-2-3-4-5) or counterclockwise (sections 5-4-3-2-1). The full Flushing−Co-op City service either ran clockwise from Flushing or counterclockwise to Flushing.

The QBx1 operated a total of ten service patterns, varying on the time of day. During weekday off-peak hours and weekends, the route operated either between Flushing and all five sections of Co-op City, or as a circulatory shuttle service between Pelham Bay and the five sections. During the AM peak a total of five service patterns were used. The three primary AM patterns were Pelham Bay to Bellamy Loop, serving Section 3 via sections 1-2-3; Pelham Bay to Asch Loop, serving Section 4 only; and Pelham Bay running clockwise via Bartow Avenue, serving Sections 4 and 5 before returning to Pelham Bay. The intermittent service to and from Flushing ran via the Bellamy Loop route. The three PM peak hour services were Flushing to Pelham Bay and Bellamy Loop; Pelham Bay to Bellamy Loop; and Pelham Bay running counterclockwise to Sections 5 and 4, Asch Loop, and back to Pelham Bay. While this structure provided direct service to individual sections of Co-op City, the structure was considered confusing and inconvenient due to the many different service patterns under one route designation, and the lack of service between Queens and the Bronx.

The following table shows the variants of the QBx1:

Variant	Flushing	Pelham Bay Park (CW)	Section 1	Section 2	Section 3	Section 4	Section 5	Pelham Bay Park (CCW)
Off-peak								
Off-peak								
AM peak								
AM peak			Skipped					
AM peak		→	Skipped				→	
AM peak			Skipped					
AM peak								
PM peak			Skipped					
PM peak								
PM peak		←	Skipped			←		

=== Current bus service ===
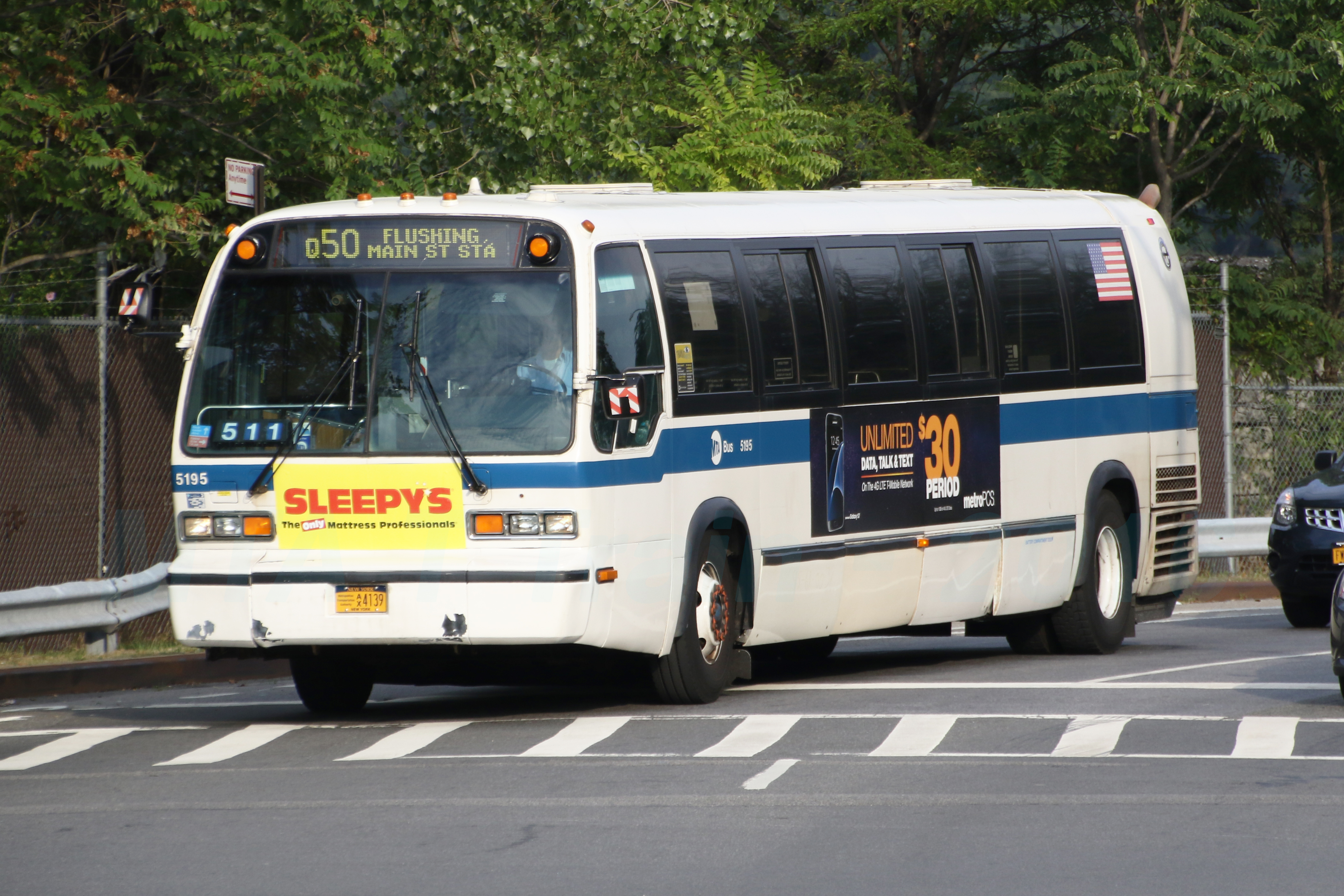
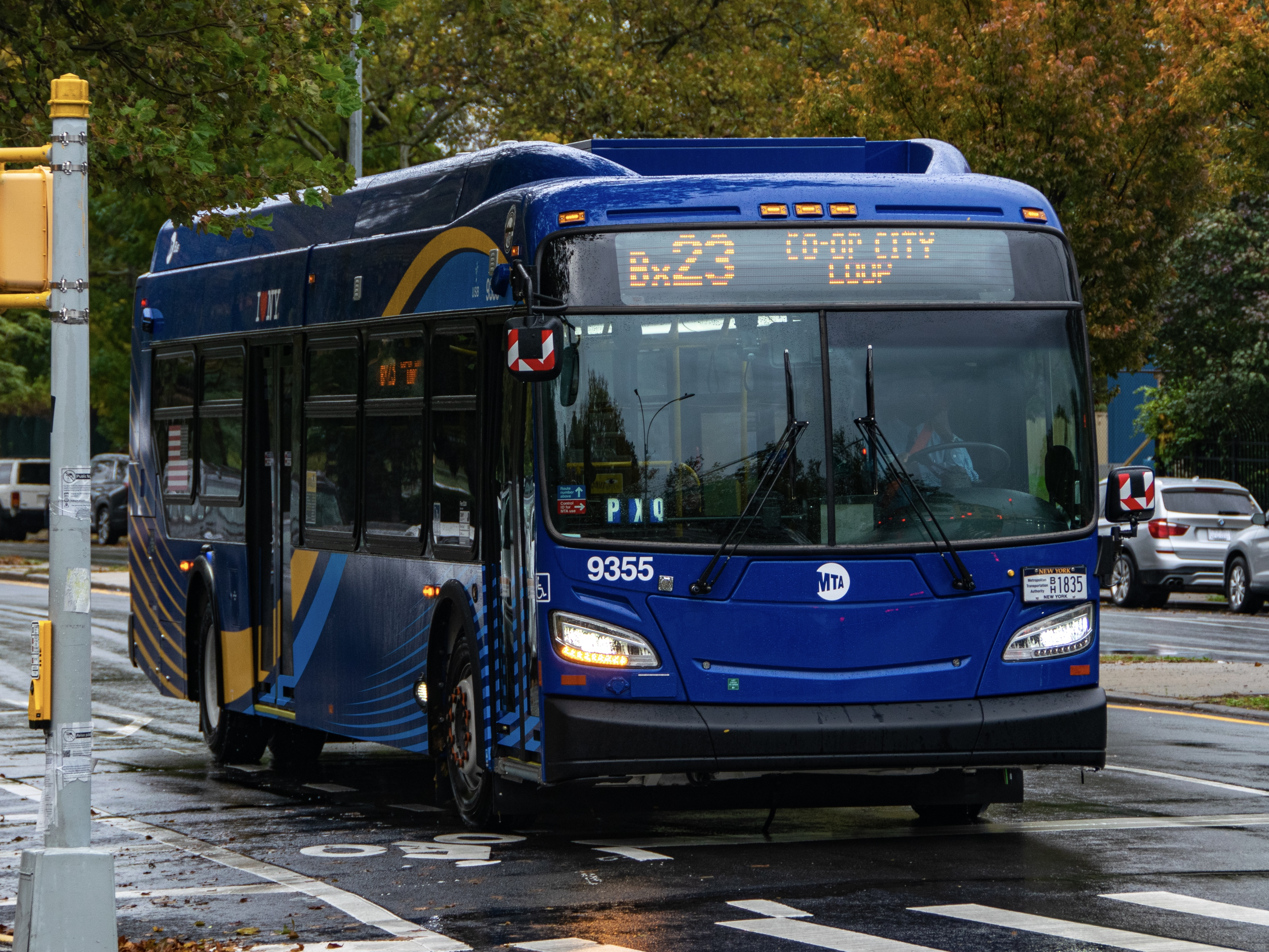
The Q50 and Bx23: 1999 Nova Bus RTS-06 (5195) on the Q50 on Peartree Ave & Co-op City Blvd (top), and 2023 New Flyer XD40 (9355) on the Co-Op City-bound Bx23 (bottom).

The Bx23 constitutes a simplified version of the former QBx1 route between Pelham Bay Park and Co-op City, running either clockwise (1-2-3-4-5) or counterclockwise (5-4-3-2-1) before returning to Pelham Bay. The Q50, meanwhile, runs primarily between Flushing and Pelham Bay Park; there is no direct Co-op City-to-Queens service except during rush hours, when Q50 buses are extended north to Erskine Place and Earhart Lane in Section 5, traveling clockwise in Co-op City northbound and counterclockwise southbound. The Q50 employs limited-stop service, making fewer stops in Queens and bypassing the individual loops of Co-op City served by the Bx23. In Queens, the Q50 has its southern terminus at Flushing–Main Street and travels along Main Street, Northern Boulevard, Linden Place, and the Whitestone Expressway. In the Bronx, the Q50 runs primarily along the New England Thruway service road south of Pelham Bay Park. The Bx23 runs at all times except late nights, whereas the Q50 operates at all times; late-night Co-op City service requires transferring to or from the Bx28.

At Pelham Bay Park, both directions of Bx23 and Q50 service share three adjacent bus stops on the southbound Bruckner Boulevard to the south of the subway station. The southernmost stop at the intersection of Bruckner and Amendola Place is used by Flushing-bound Q50 service. The middle stop is used by all clockwise Co-Op City service (Q50 buses to Section 5 and Bx23 buses via 1-2-3-4-5). The northernmost stop is used by Bx23 buses operating the counterclockwise loop. Because of this setup, Bronx-bound Q50 buses U-turn at Westchester Avenue to stop at Pelham Bay, then U-turn again towards Co-op City.

Prior to 2014, the Bx23 employed additional service patterns during rush hours, similar to its predecessor route. Buses would travel via 1-2-3-4 (AM rush) or 4-3-2-1 (PM rush) and return to Pelham Bay, or directly to Section 5 via Bartow Avenue/Bay Plaza/Section 4 (clockwise AM; counterclockwise PM) and return to Pelham Bay. This was eliminated to maintain one consistent service pattern at all times, and allow service between all sections of Co-op City at all times.

The Bx23 and Q50 are two of the several local bus routes to serve Co-op City, which is heavily dependent on bus service. They are among four routes (along with the Bx5 on weekends, and the Bx12 SBS) to feed into Pelham Bay Park station from the neighborhood, and the only two to serve all five sections of the development (except for the late night Bx28 service).

=== School trippers ===
When school is in session, one Bx23 bus in the counterclockwise direction originates at Donizetti Place, where several schools are located. This trip departs at 2:28pm. The Q50 covers Monsignor Scanlan High School, where a bus is placed into Pelham Bay service at 2:44pm.

== History ==
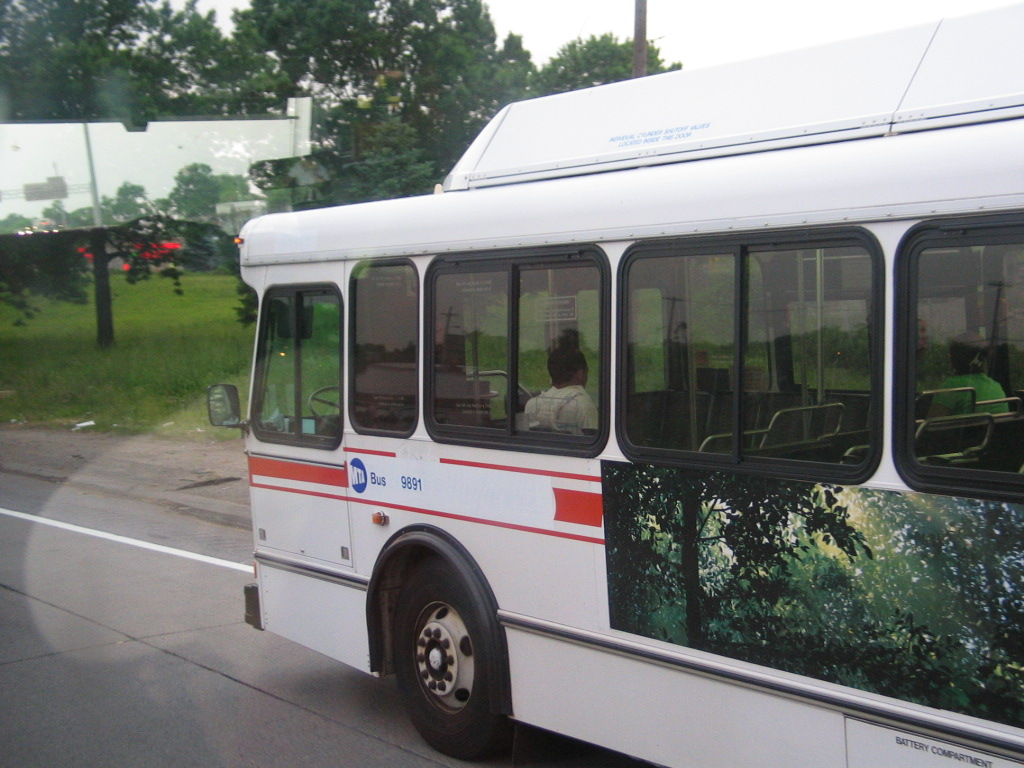
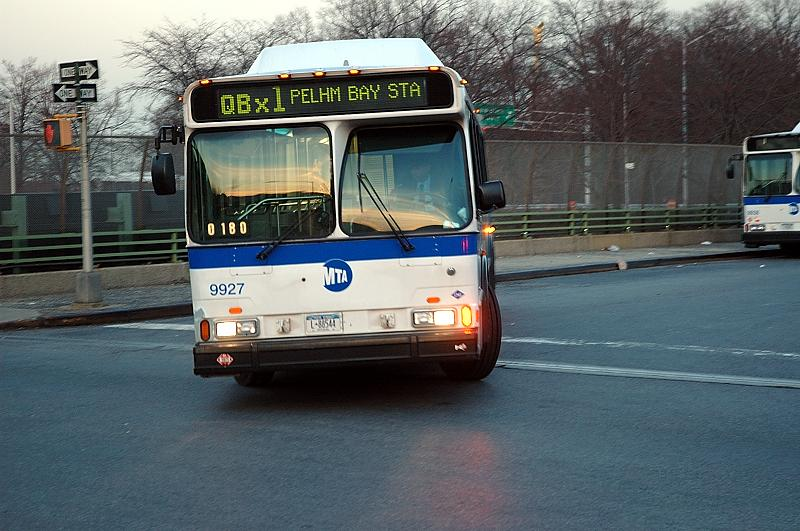
Two 1999 Orion V CNGs from the former Queens Surface on the QBx1 under MTA operations before (9891; left) and after (9927; right) repainting into MTA colors.

The QBx1 was in operation since at least the mid-1960s under the Queens Transit Corporation, labeled the "Bx1" on Queens bus maps. The route originally operated between Flushing and Pelham Bay Park. By 1968, the QBx1 was extended to Co-op City. The bus company would become Queens-Steinway Transit Corporation in 1986, and Queens Surface Corporation in 1988.

On February 27, 2005, the MTA Bus Company took over the operations of the Queens Surface routes as part of the city's takeover of all the remaining privately operated bus routes.

In 2009, ten buses from the Eastchester Depot near Co-op City (the former New York Bus Service depot) began to operate on QBx1 service. Two additional stops in the Bronx were added to the route in June 2010, at Baisley Avenue (southbound) and Kearny Avenue (northbound) both at Bruckner Boulevard, to connect with a pedestrian overpass to the Country Club neighborhood.

=== QBx1 split ===
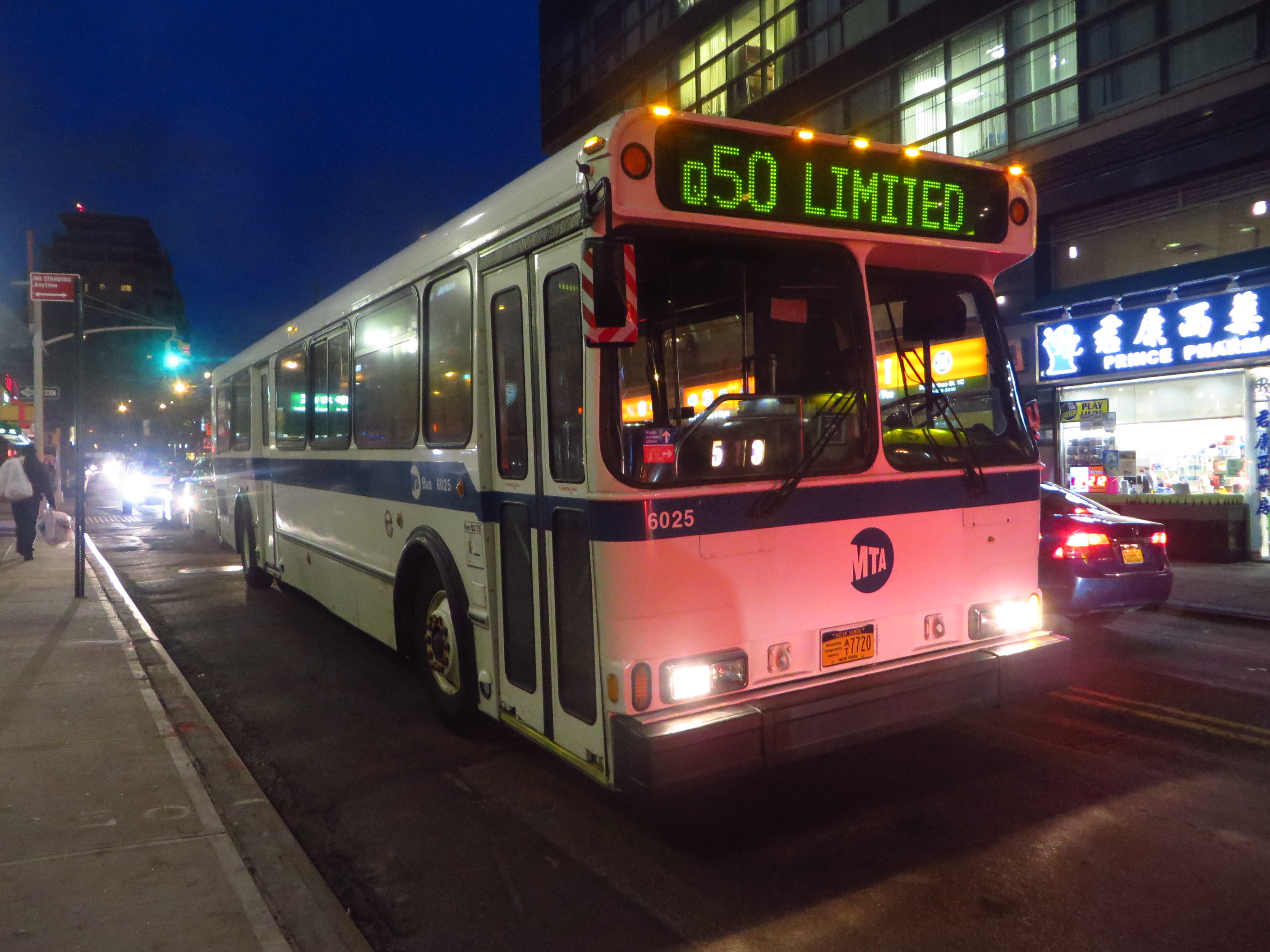
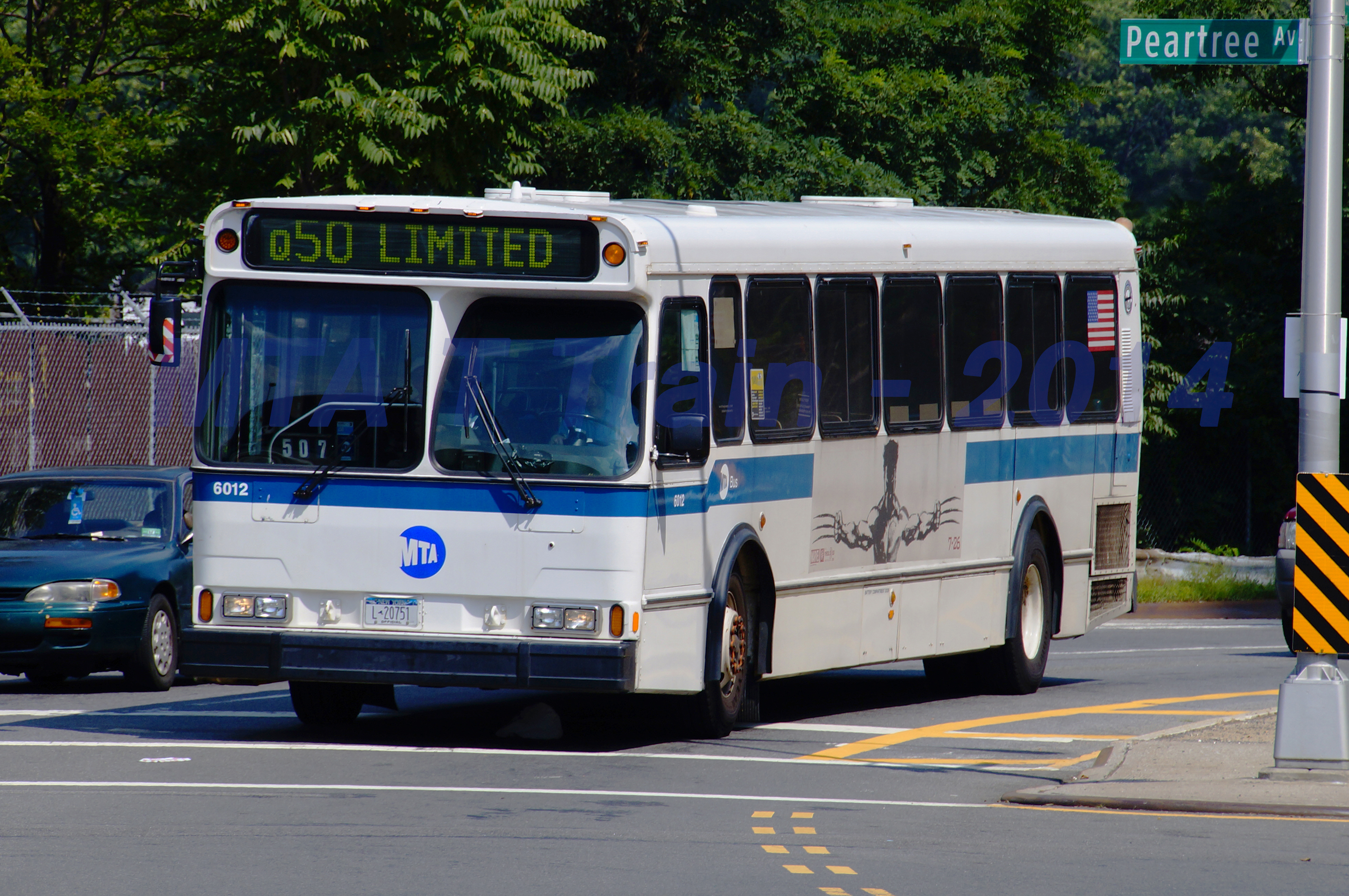
Two 1999 Orion Vs on the Q50 Limited: 6025 near the Flushing-Main St station (top), and 6012 bound for Flushing at Co-Op City Boulevard/Peartree Avenue (bottom).

On September 12, 2010, the QBx1 was split into the Q50 Limited and Bx23 routes, simplifying the many service patterns of the former QBx1 route, but eliminating direct service between Pelham Bay and the individual sections of Co-op City. In addition, the changes were made in conjunction with controversial cuts in service to other Co-op City routes during the MTA's 2010 budget crisis, and received negative input from the community.

On June 29, 2014, the rush hour service pattern of the Bx23 was eliminated, with the off-peak pattern going into effect at all times. In addition, a stop on the Bx23 was added at Adler Place in the Asch Loop. A stop for the Q50 was also added outside the Dreiser Loop. These changes were the result of a study of bus routes in Co-op City.

=== Bus redesigns ===
As part of the MTA's 2017 Fast Forward Plan to speed up mass transit service, a draft plan for a reorganization of Bronx bus routes was proposed in draft format in June 2019, with a final version published in October 2019. The Bronx draft plan called for the Bx23 to be the sole route serving Co-op City; many of the draft proposals were not included in the final version. These changes were set to take effect in mid-2020. The final Bronx bus plan did not modify the Bx23's routing or stop locations, though the frequency of the route was to be increased. Additionally, in December 2019, the MTA released a draft redesign of the Queens bus network. As part of the Queens redesign, the Q50 would have become the QT50, extended to LaGuardia Airport; the northern section in Co-op City would have been truncated. Both redesigns were delayed due to the COVID-19 pandemic in New York City in 2020. The original Queens draft plan was dropped due to negative feedback, while the implementation of the Bronx redesign was postponed to mid-2022.

A revised Queens draft plan was released in March 2022. The plan for the Q50 is similar to that in the 2019 redesign and would still serve LaGuardia Airport. The Bronx bus redesign took effect on June 26, 2022; as part of the Bronx redesign, the Q50 only served Co-op City during rush hours, terminating at Pelham Bay Park during all other times.

A final bus redesign plan for Queens was released in December 2023. The Q50 would still be extended to LaGuardia Airport but would use Roosevelt Avenue instead, taking over the routing of the previous Q48 route. The Q50 would also start running 24/7.

On December 17, 2024, addendums to the final plan were released. A stop in both directions was placed at Whitestone Expressway/14th Avenue for customer benefits from College Point and Whitestone, and current daytime patterns were retained. Because of circumstances facing service to LaGuardia Airport, the Q50 was not extended from Flushing to LaGuardia. Instead, existing service between Flushing and LaGuardia Airport was largely retained; the former Q48 was replaced with the Q90 limited-stop service, which makes fewer stops and runs via Seaver Way in Willets Point instead of 108th Street in Corona. On January 29, 2025, the current plan was approved by the MTA Board, and the Queens Bus Redesign went into effect in two different phases during Summer 2025. The Q50 is part of Phase I, which started on June 29, 2025.

== Bike racks ==
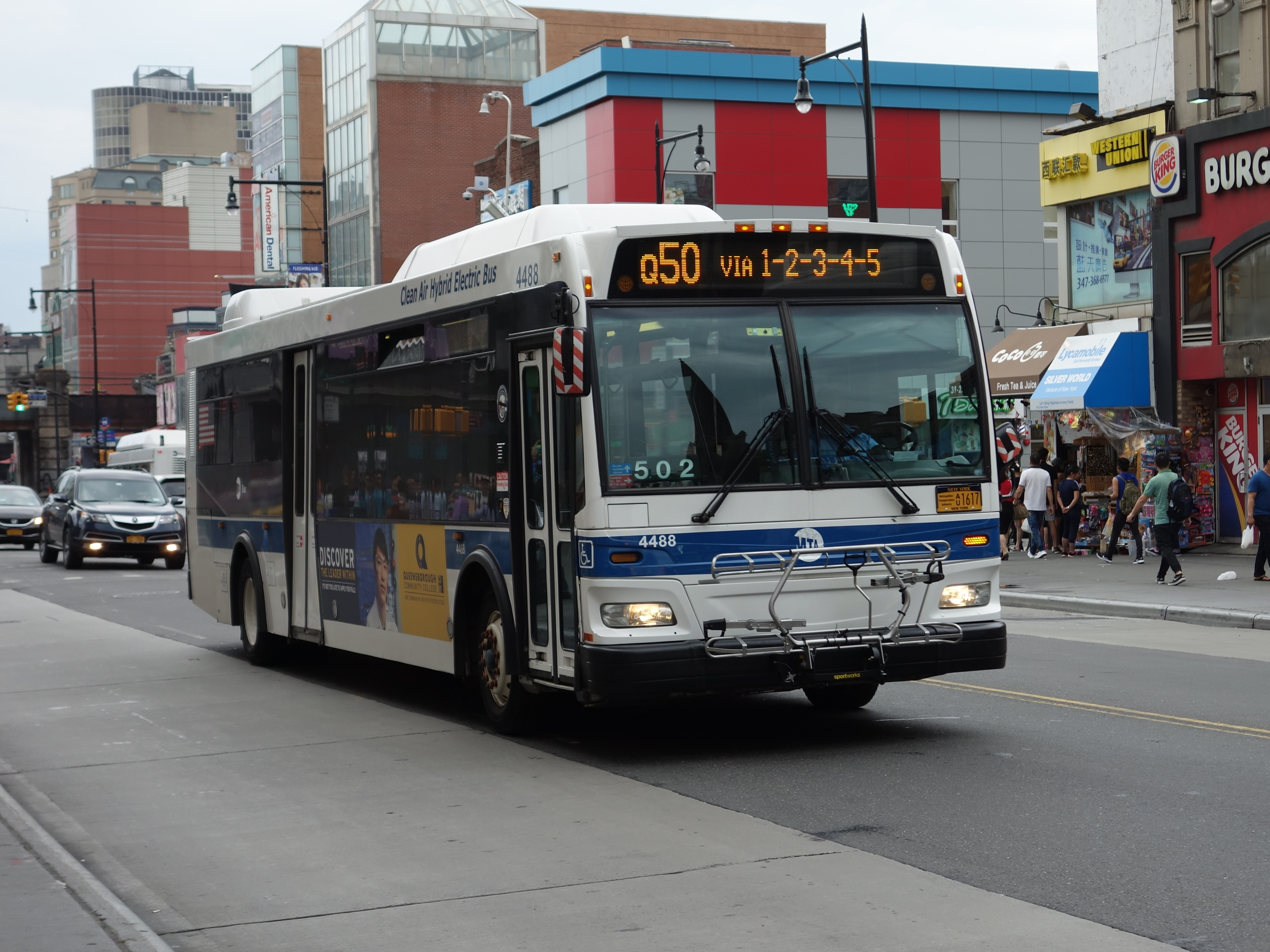
Bike racks installed on a 2009 Orion VII NG HEV (4488) for the Q50 in Flushing, at Main St/39th Ave in July 2018

In April 1994, bike racks were installed onto QBx1 buses to carry bicycles over the Whitestone Bridge. This was the first bike-on-bus program in the city. The service was offered on a seasonal basis (April to September), with pick-up/drop-off points at 20th Avenue in Whitestone, Queens and Lafayette Avenue near Ferry Point Park in the Bronx. However, the bike-on-bus program was eliminated on February 27, 2005, the same day as the MTA takeover.

In 2017, it was announced that bike racks would be installed on the fronts of Bx23 and Q50 buses by spring 2018. Each rack, mounted on the front of each bus, would be able to carry two bicycles. This was part of the MTA's ongoing pilot program to mount bike racks on several bus routes. In September 2015, the S53 and S93 routes in Staten Island had been the first routes to receive the racks. The expanded program restored bike racks on the Flushing to Co-op City bus corridor for the first time since 2005. On July 1, 2018, bike rack service was inaugurated on the Bx23 and Q50 routes. When the New Flyer XD40s came into service for the Q50 and Bx23, they originally didn't come with bike racks. However, in 2025, bike racks began being installed on Q50 buses again.
