= Country Club, Bronx =

Neighborhood in New York City

Country Club
- Neighborhood of the Bronx
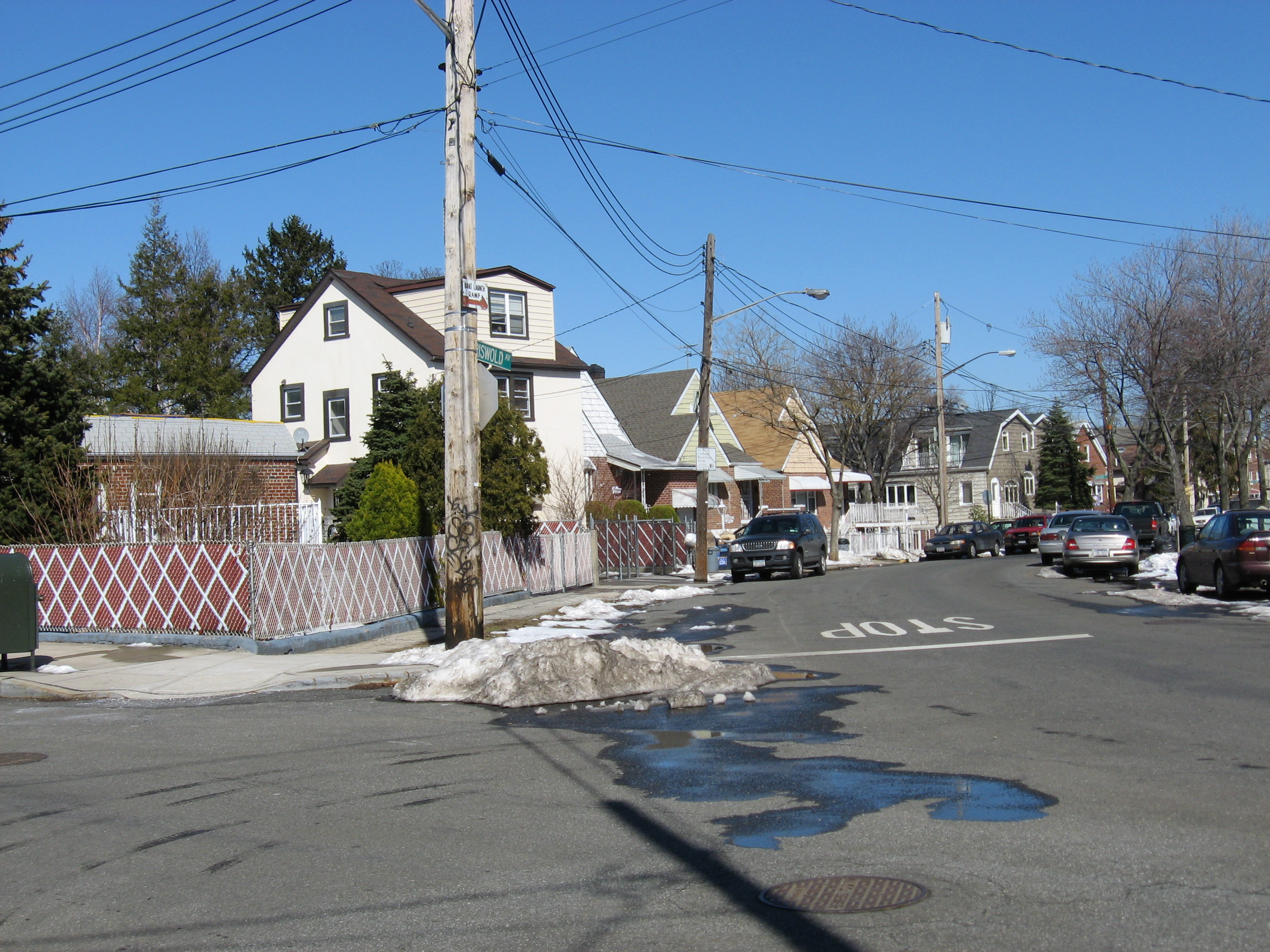
- Griswold & Research Avenues in Country Club
- Interactive map of Country Club
- Coordinates: 40.839°N 73.82°W
- Country: United States
- State: New York
- City: New York City
- Borough: The Bronx
- Community District: Bronx 10

Area
  - Total: 0.208 sq mi (0.54 km^{2})

Population (2011)
  - Total: 3,548 (estimated)
  - Density: 17,100/sq mi (6,590/km^{2})

Economics
  - Median income: $84,852
- Time zone: UTC−05:00 (Eastern (EST))
  - Summer (DST): UTC−04:00 (Eastern (EDT))
- ZIP Codes: 10465
- Area code: 718, 347, 929, and 917

Country Club is a residential neighborhood located in the East Bronx in New York City. The neighborhood's boundaries are Middletown Road and Watt Avenue to the north, Eastchester Bay to the east, Layton Avenue and the Throggs Neck neighborhood to the south, and the New England Thruway and Pelham Bay neighborhood to the west. Pelham Bay Park (including Orchard Beach), the largest public park in New York City, is located just north of Country Club.

The neighborhood is part of Bronx Community Board 10, and its ZIP Code is 10465. The area is policed by the 45th Precinct of the New York City Police Department. Country Club contains a large Italian-American population.

== Demographics ==
As of 2018 Country Club has a population of around 7,500 people. It is a predominantly white neighborhood with around 73.0% of the population being non-Hispanic white, while approximately 22.3% are Hispanic or Latino, 3.5% are Asian, and the remaining are black, two or more races, or another race. Country Club also has a sizable Italian-American community with many family owned Italian specialty stores and delicatessens.

The entirety of Community District 10, which comprises Country Club, City Island, Co-op City, Pelham Bay, Schuylerville, Throgs Neck, and Westchester Square, had 121,868 inhabitants as of NYC Health's 2018 Community Health Profile, with an average life expectancy of 81.1 years. This is about the same as the median life expectancy of 81.2 for all New York City neighborhoods. Most inhabitants are youth and middle-aged adults: 20% are between the ages of between 0–17, 26% between 25 and 44, and 27% between 45 and 64. The proportion of college-aged and elderly residents was lower, at 9% and 18% respectively.

== Health ==
As of 2018, preterm births are more common in Community District 10, which comprises Country Club, City Island, Co-op City, Pelham Bay, Schuylerville, Throgs Neck, and Westchester Square, than in other places citywide, though births to teenage mothers are less common. In Community District 10, there were 110 preterm births per 1,000 live births (compared to 87 per 1,000 citywide), and 10.3 births to teenage mothers per 1,000 live births (compared to 19.3 per 1,000 citywide). Community District 10 has a low population of residents who are uninsured. In 2018, this population of uninsured residents was estimated to be 7%, lower than the citywide rate of 14%, though this was based on a small sample size.

The concentration of fine particulate matter, the deadliest type of air pollutant, in Community District 10 is 0.0075 milligrams per cubic metre (7.5×10^{−9} oz/ft^{3}), the same as the city average. Fourteen percent of Community District 10 residents are smokers, which is the same as the city average of 14% of residents being smokers. In Community District 10, 24% of residents are obese, 13% are diabetic, and 37% have high blood pressure—compared to the citywide averages of 24%, 11%, and 28% respectively. In addition, 25% of children are obese, compared to the citywide average of 20%.

Eighty-seven percent of residents eat some fruits and vegetables every day, which is the same as the city's average of 87%. In 2018, 77% of residents described their health as "good", "very good", or "excellent", about the same as the city's average of 78%. For every supermarket in Community District 10, there are 7 bodegas.

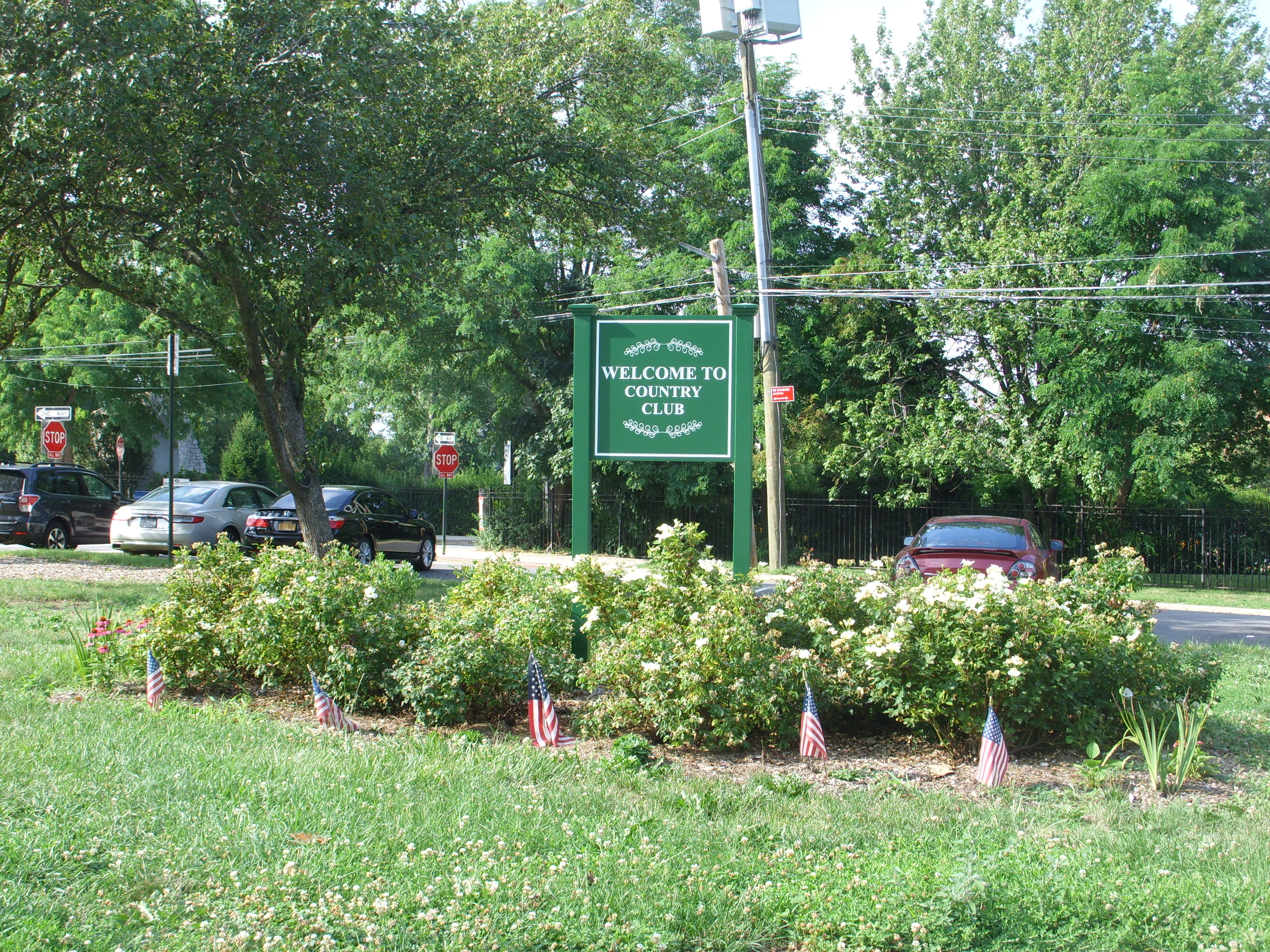
Country Club Neighborhood Sign at the intersection Fairmount Ave and Dean Ave

== Post Office and ZIP Code ==
Country Club is located within ZIP Code 10465. The closest post offices are the Throggs Neck Post Office at 3630 East Tremont Avenue and the Pilgrim Post Office at 1545 Crosby Avenue, both operated by the United States Postal Service.

== Education ==
Country Club has a private primary educational institution within its borders, Villa Maria Academy, operated by the Congregation of Notre Dame of Montreal. The two zoned public elementary schools are PS 71 (zoned for residents above Waterbury Avenue), and PS 14 (zoned for residents below Waterbury Avenue), both in nearby Pelham Bay in the New York City Department of Education's District 8. The zoned middle school is the Urban Institute of Mathematics.

== Police and crime ==
Country Club is patrolled by the 45th Precinct of the NYPD, located at 2877 Barkley Avenue in Throggs Neck. The 45th Precinct ranked 28th safest out of 69 patrol areas for per-capita crime in 2010. As of 2018, with a non-fatal assault rate of 53 per 100,000 people, the 45th Precinct's rate of violent crimes per capita is less than that of the city as a whole. The Community District 10 incarceration rate of 243 per 100,000 people is lower than that of the city as a whole.

The 45th Precinct has a lower crime rate than in the 1990s, with crimes across all categories having decreased by 67% between 1990 and 2022. The precinct reported five murders, 13 rapes, 235 robberies, 265 felony assaults, 108 burglaries, 609 grand larcenies, and 323 grand larcenies auto in 2022.

== Fire safety ==
Country Club is served by the New York City Fire Department (FDNY)'s Engine Co. 89/Ladder Co. 50 is located at 2924 Bruckner Boulevard.

== Transportation ==
Country Club is close to Interstate 95 as well as to major bridges such as the Throgs Neck Bridge. There are two New York City Subway stations nearby: Pelham Bay Park and Buhre Avenue, both on the 6 and <6> trains, are located to the northwest in the Pelham Bay neighborhood. Additionally, the community is the home of the Evers Marina and Seaplane Base on the west bank of Eastchester Bay at Outlook Point.

The following MTA Regional Bus Operations bus routes serve Country Club:

- Bx8: to Locust Point or Williamsbridge via Throgs Neck Boulevard, Crosby Avenue, Williamsbridge Road, and Bronxwood Avenue
- Bx24: to Hutchinson Metro Center via Marconi Street, Westchester Avenue, Bruckner Boulevard, and Country Club Road
- BxM8: to Pelham Bay or Midtown Manhattan via Bruckner Expressway
- BxM9: to Throggs Neck or Midtown Manhattan via Bruckner Expressway
