= Community boards of the Bronx =

Local government unit in New York City

Map of community districts in the City of New York

Community boards of the Bronx are the 12 New York City community boards in the borough of the Bronx, which are the appointed advisory groups of the community districts that advise on land use and zoning, participate in the city budget process, and address service delivery in their district.

Community boards are each composed of up to 50 volunteer members appointed by the Bronx borough president, half from nominations by City Council members representing the community district (i.e., whose council districts cover part of the community district). Additionally, all City Council members representing the community district are non-voting, ex officio board members.

== History ==
The 1963 revision of the New York City Charter extended the Borough of Manhattan's "Community Planning Councils" (est. 1951) to the outer boroughs as "Community Planning Boards", which are now known as "Community Boards".

The 1975 revision of the New York City Charter set the number of Community Districts/Boards to 59, established the position of the district manager for the community districts, and created the Uniform Land Use Review Procedure (ULURP) which gave the community boards the authority to review land use proposals such as zoning actions, and special permits.

== Community Districts ==
Community Districts in the Bronx
Community District (CD)	Region	Area	Pop. Census 2010	Pop./ km^{2}	Neighborhoods & areas	District Manager	NYPD Precinct & commander
Bronx CD 1 website	South Bronx	7.17 km^{2} (2.77 sq mi)	91,497	12,761	Melrose, Mott Haven, Port Morris, and The Hub shopping district	Anthony R Jordan	40th Robert M. Gallitelli
Bronx CD 2 website	South Bronx	5.54 km^{2} (2.14 sq mi)	52,246	9,792	Hunts Point, Longwood	Rafael Acevedo	41st Jeremy Scheublin
Bronx CD 3 website	South Bronx	4.07 km^{2} (1.57 sq mi)	79,762	19,598	Claremont, Crotona Park East (East Morrisania), Morrisania	John Dudley	42nd Carlos Ghonz
Bronx CD 4 website	West Bronx	5.28 km^{2} (2.04 sq mi)	146,441	27,735	Concourse (Concourse Village), Highbridge	Paul Philps	44th Louis Deceglie
Bronx CD 5 website	West Bronx	3.55 km^{2} (1.37 sq mi)	128,200	36,145	Fordham (split with Bronx CD 7), Morris Heights, Mount Hope, University Heights, and Fordham Plaza shopping district	Ken Brown	46th Richard Brea
Bronx CD 6 website	West Bronx	4.01 km^{2} (1.55 sq mi)	83,268	20,765	Bathgate, Belmont, East Tremont, West Farms	John Sanchez	48th Joseph G. Tompkins
Bronx CD 7 website	West Bronx	4.84 km^{2} (1.87 sq mi)	139,286	28,778	Bedford Park, Jerome Park Kingsbridge, Norwood, University Heights, Fordham (split with Bronx CD 5)	Ischia Bravo	52nd Thomas J. Alps
Bronx CD 8 website	West Bronx	8.83 km^{2} (3.41 sq mi)	101,731	11,521	Fieldston, Kingsbridge, Kingsbridge Heights, Marble Hill (technically part of Manhattan), Riverdale, Spuyten Duyvil, Van Cortlandt Village	Farrah Kule Rubin	50th Ryan Pierce
Bronx CD 9 website	East Bronx	12.41 km^{2} (4.79 sq mi)	172,298	13,884	Bronx River, Bruckner, Castle Hill, Clason Point, Harding Park, Parkchester, Soundview, Unionport	William Rivera	43rd Benjamin D. Gurley
Bronx CD 10 website	East Bronx	16.76 km^{2} (6.47 sq mi)	120,392	7,183	City Island, Co-op City, Locust Point, Pelham Bay (neighborhood), Throggs Neck, Westchester Square	Matthew Cruz	45th Thomas Fraser
Bronx CD 11 website	East Bronx	9.32 km^{2} (3.60 sq mi)	113,232	12,149	Allerton, Bronxdale, Indian Village, Laconia, Morris Park, Pelham Gardens, Pelham Parkway (neighborhood), Van Nest	Jeremy Warneke	49th Andrew Natiw
Bronx CD 12 website	Primarily East Bronx	14.56 km^{2} (5.62 sq mi)	152,344	10,463	Baychester, Eastchester (and Edenwald), Fish Bay, Olinville, Wakefield, Williamsbridge, Woodlawn	George Torres	47th Erik Hernandez
The Bronx	All	110 km^{2} (42 sq mi)	1,455,720 (in 2016)	13,233.8	East Bronx, West Bronx (including the South Bronx)	Thomas Lucania, Community Boards Unit Director	Bronx Community Boards website

Borough	Borough President (B.P.)	Number of Districts	Max. number of all appointees
The Bronx	Vanessa Gibson	12	600

== The Bronx Borough Board ==
The Bronx Borough Board is composed of the borough president, New York City Council members whose districts are part of the borough, and the chairperson of each community board in the Bronx.

The current borough board is composed of the 22 members listed in the table below:

The Bronx Borough Board
Area	Title	Member name	Notes
Bronx Community District 1	Chairperson	Clarisa M. Alayeto	
Bronx Community District 2	Chairperson	Roberto Crespo	
Bronx Community District 3	Chairperson	Joetta Brown	
Bronx Community District 4	Chairperson	Ms. Beverly Bond	
Bronx Community District 5	Chairperson	Angel Caraballo	
Bronx Community District 6	Chairperson	Evonne Capers	
Bronx Community District 7	Chairperson	Yajaira Arias	
Bronx Community District 8	Chairperson	Julie Reyes	
Bronx Community District 9	Chairperson	Mohammed Mujumder	
Bronx Community District 10	Chairperson	Joseph Russo	
Bronx Community District 11	Chairperson	Cynthia Rodriguez	
Bronx Community District 12	Chairperson	Beatriz Coronel	
City Council District 8	Council member	Diana Ayala	Also a member of the Manhattan Borough Board
City Council District 11	Council member	Eric Dinowitz	
City Council District 12	Council member	Kevin Riley	
City Council District 13	Council member	Marjorie Velázquez	
City Council District 14	Council member	Pierina Sanchez	
City Council District 15	Council member	Oswald Feliz	
City Council District 16	Council member	Althea Stevens	
City Council District 17	Council member	Rafael Salamanca	
City Council District 18	Council member	Amanda Farías	
Borough of The Bronx	Borough President	Vanessa Gibson	

== Other areas ==
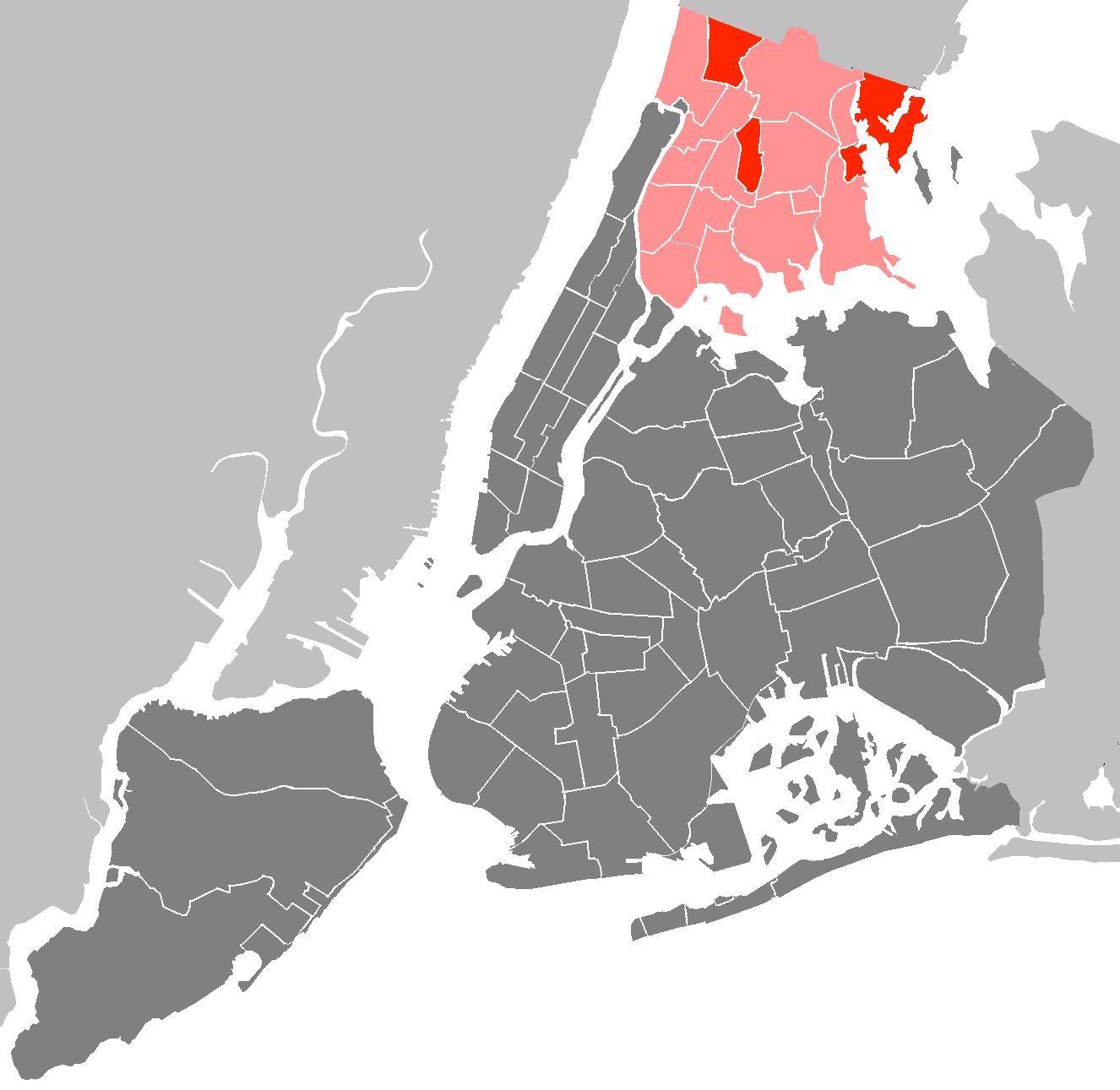
Bronx Community Districts - Joint Interest Areas (JIAs).

Within the borough of The Bronx there are three Joint Interest Areas (JIA), which are outside of the jurisdiction of individual community districts, and have their own district number. The three JIAs in the county of The Bronx are:

- District 27 - Bronx Park, 2010 Census population: 1351
- District 28 - Pelham Bay Park, 2010 Census population: 432
- District 26 - Van Cortlandt Park, 2010 Census population: Zero

Marble Hill, which is a part of New York County, is represented by Bronx Community District 8.

Rikers Island, while a part of The Bronx, is represented by Queens Community District 1.

== Notable people ==
Notable people who were community board members and/or staffers prior to becoming elected officials:

- Rafael Salamanca (CB2 member and District Manager)
- Eric Stevenson (politician) (CB3 member)
- Latoya Joyner (CB4 member)
- Adolfo Carrión Jr. (CB5 District Manager)
- Andrew Cohen (politician) (CB8 member)
- Eric Dinowitz (CB8 member)
- Marjorie Velázquez (CB10 member)
- James Vacca (CB10 Chairperson and District Manager)
- Jeffrey D. Klein (CB11 member)

== Gallery ==
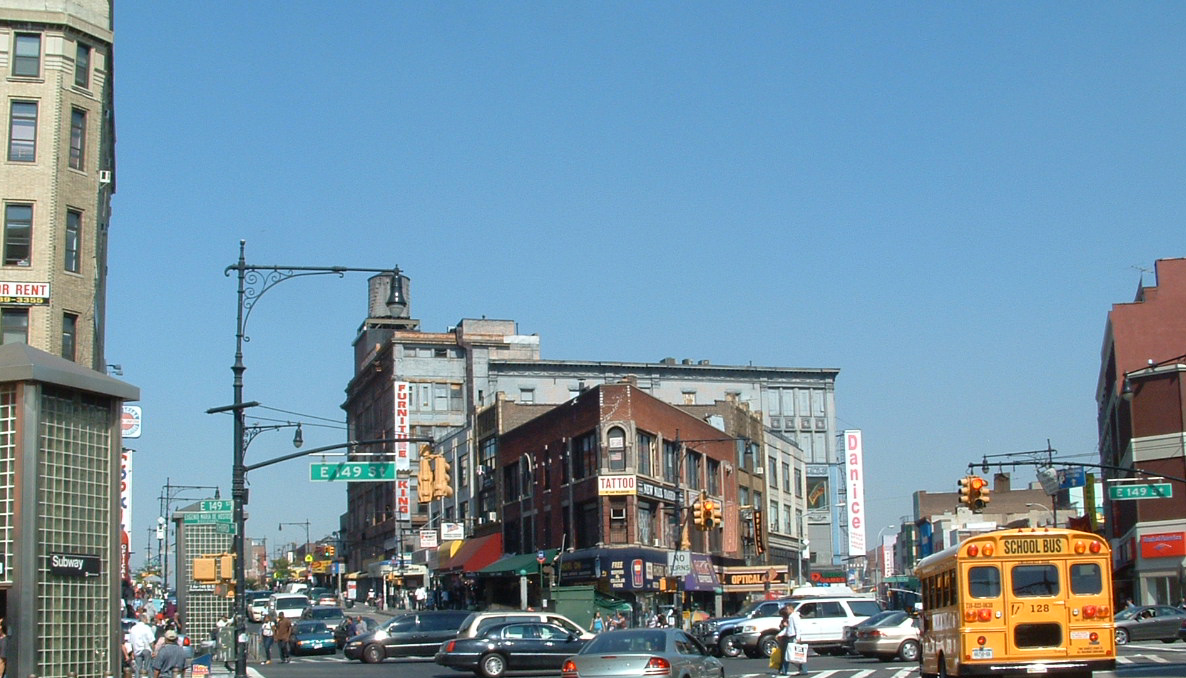
The Hub, South Bronx

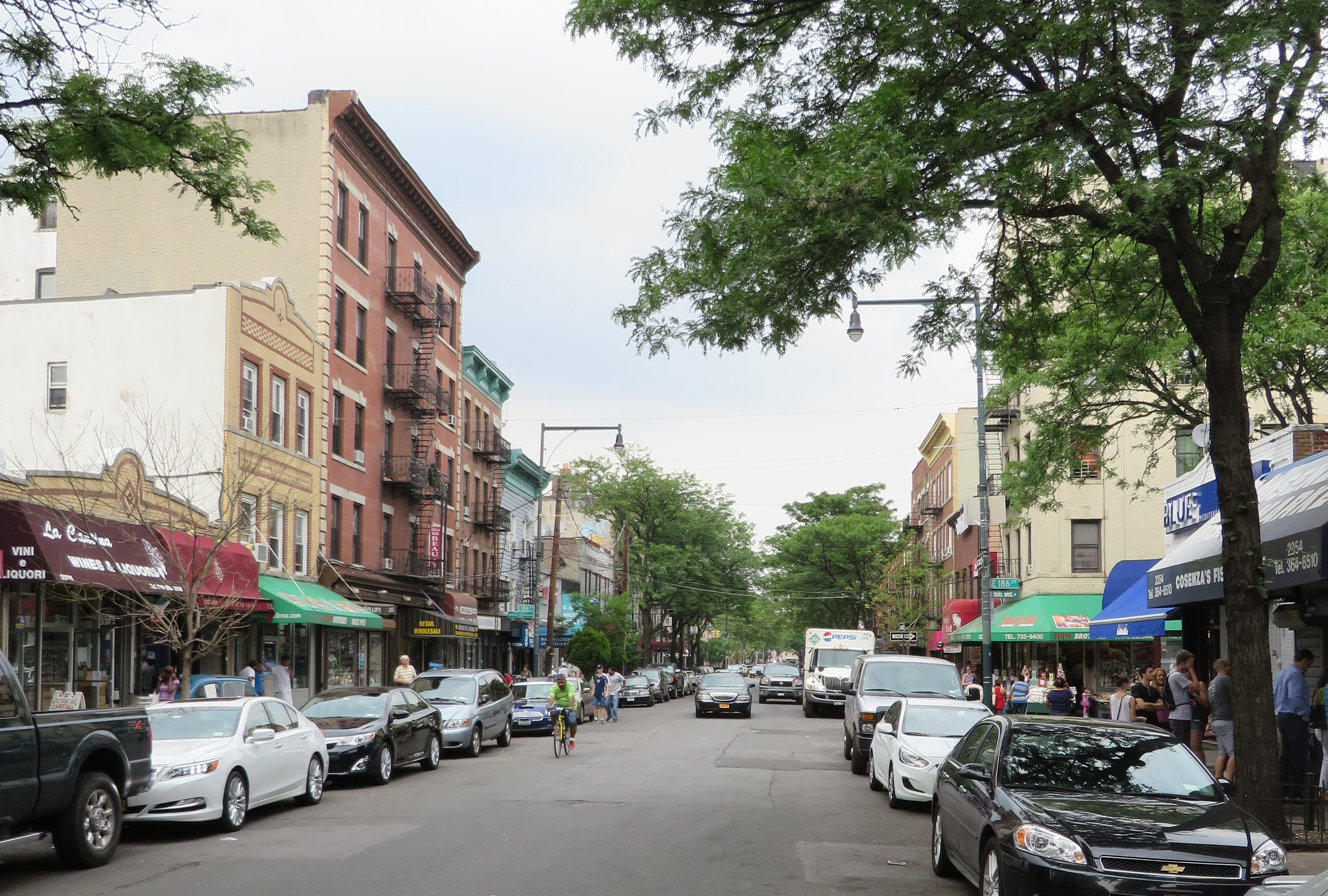
Belmont, West Bronx

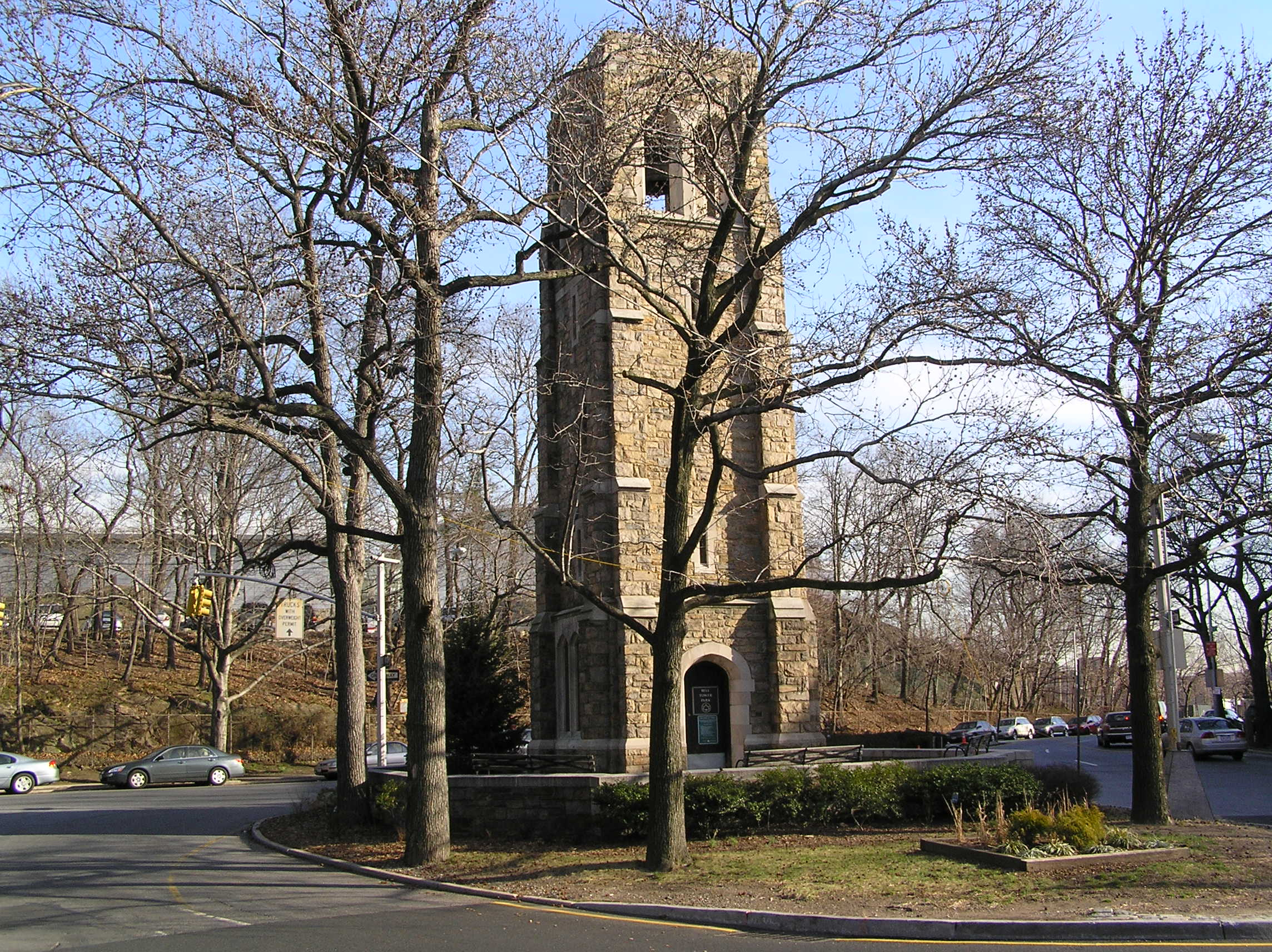
Riverdale, West Bronx

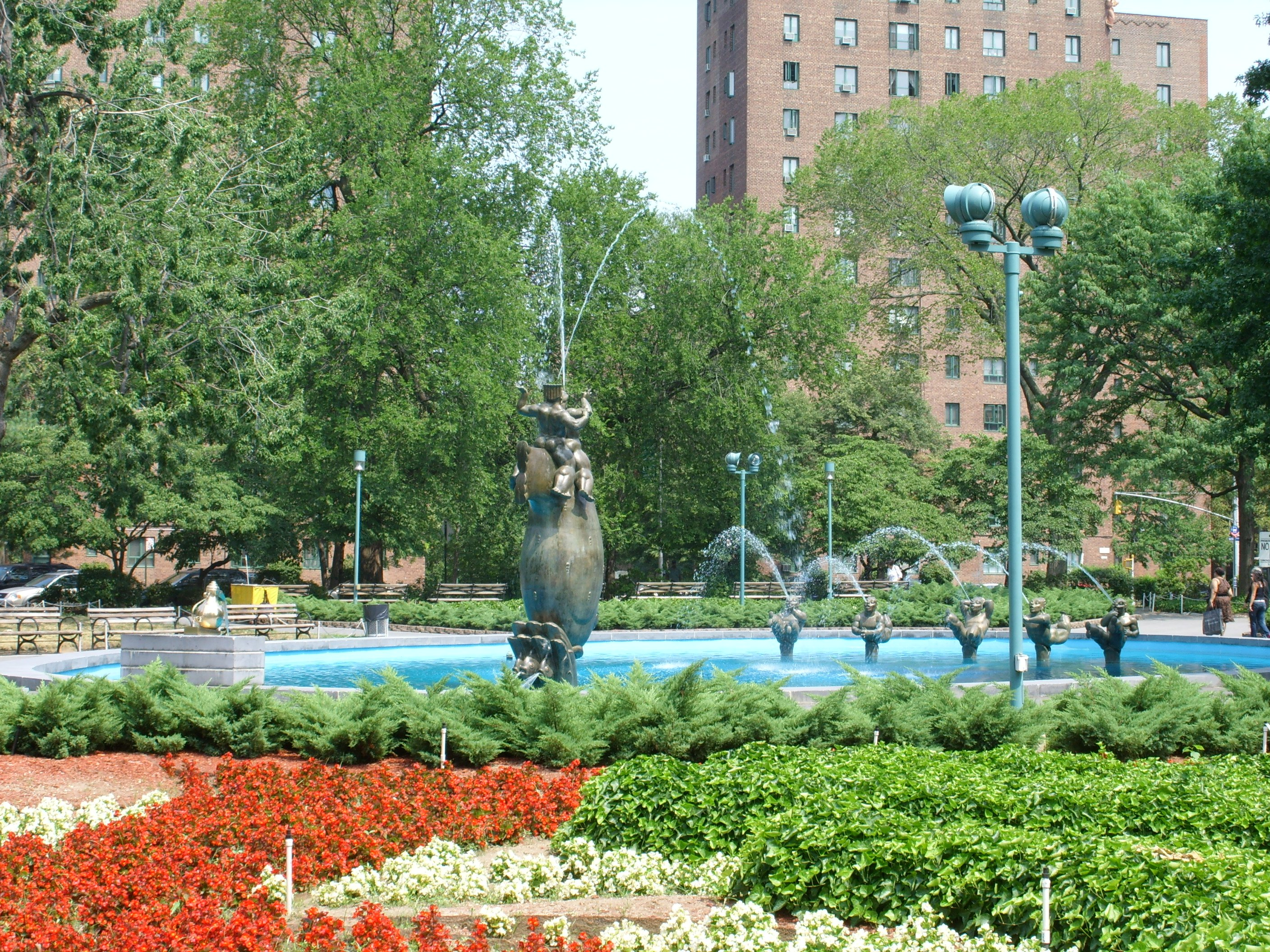
Parkchester, East Bronx

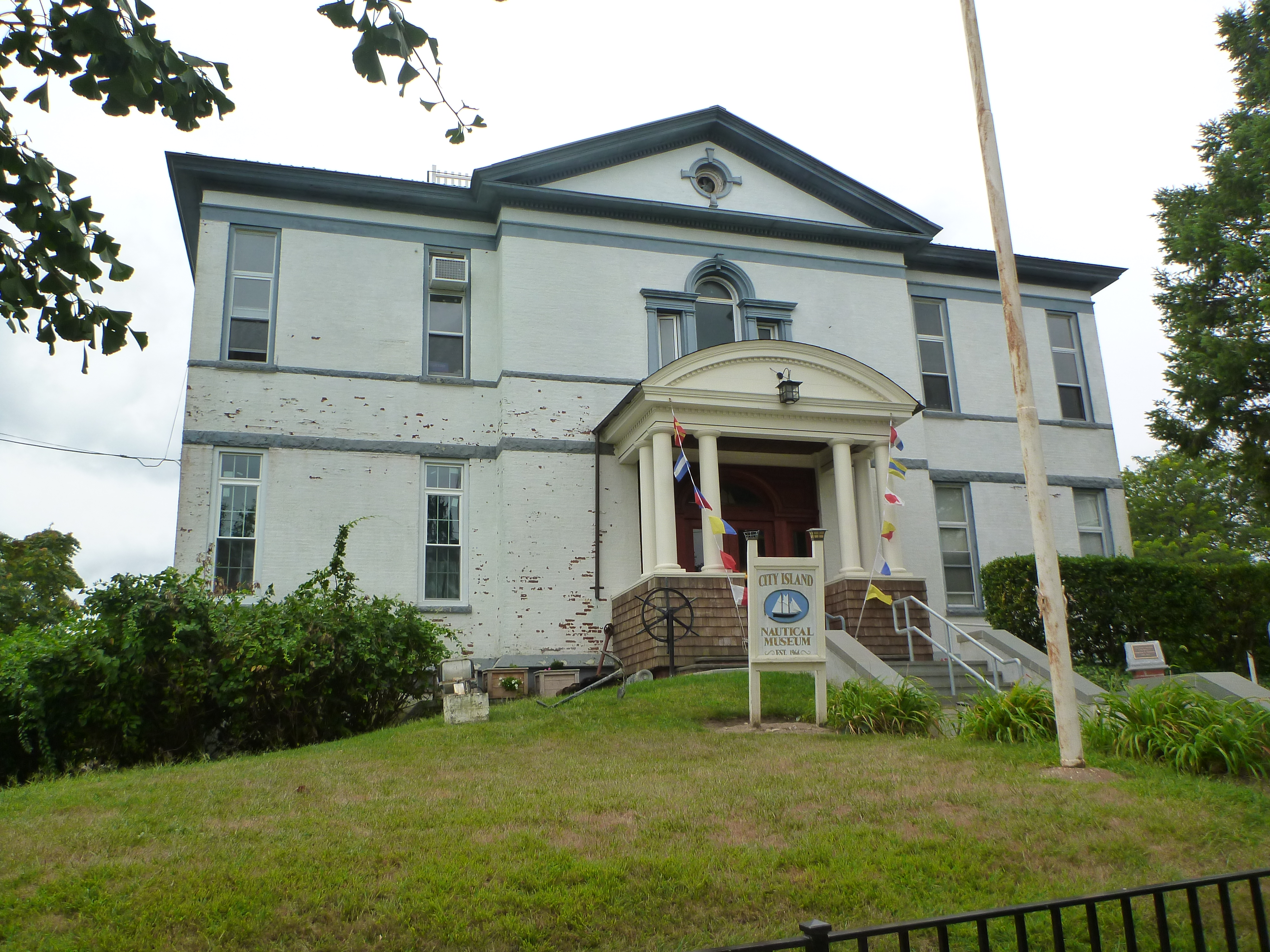
City Island, Bronx

== See also ==
- List of Bronx neighborhoods
- Borough boards of New York City
- Government of New York City
- New York City Council
- Borough president
