= East Bronx =

Region of the Bronx in New York City

Coordinates: 40.8517°N 73.8306°W

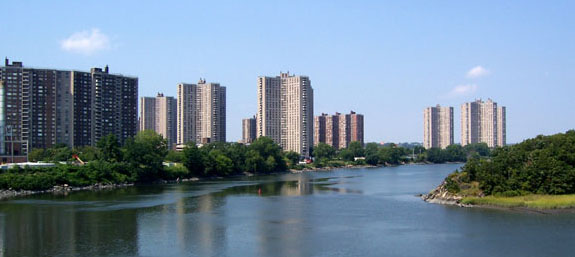
The neighborhood of Co-op City is the largest cooperative housing development in the world.

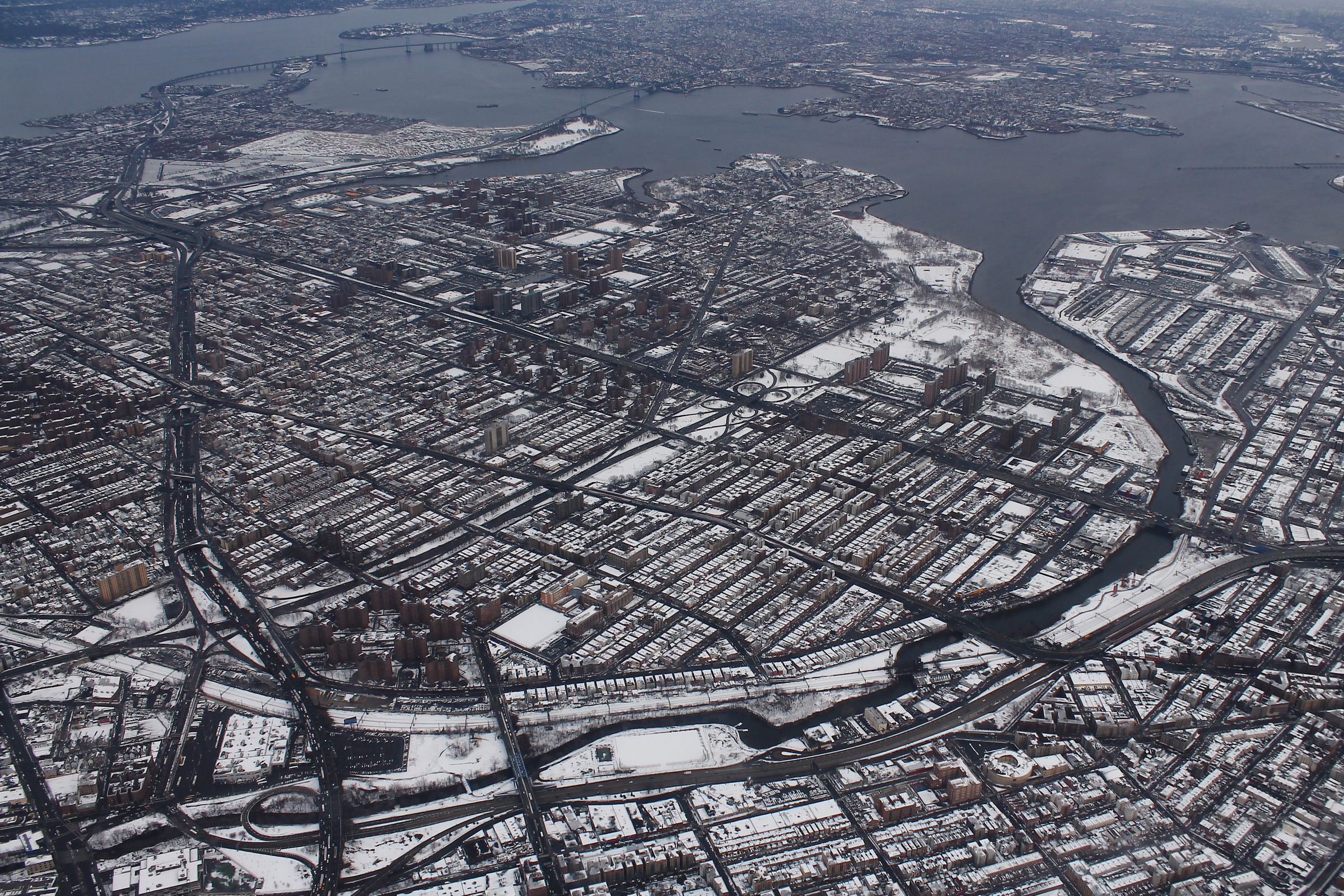
Aerial view of Bronx River and southern part of East Bronx

1891 map of the Town of Westchester, which became the East Bronx when it was annexed into New York City in 1895

East Bronx is the part of the New York City borough of the Bronx which lies east of the Bronx River; this roughly corresponds to the eastern half of the borough. Neighborhoods include: Baychester, Castle Hill, City Island, Co-op City, Country Club, Eastchester, Edenwald, Edgewater Park, Harding Park, Morris Park, Parkchester, Pelham Bay, Pelham Parkway, Soundview, Throggs Neck, Van Nest, Wakefield, Westchester Square, and Williamsbridge.

The East Bronx is less densely populated than the West Bronx. While the West Bronx is older and its underlying Fordham gneiss is very hilly, the East Bronx is not only later-settled but also underlain by younger schist and in most parts flat and coastal, much like the neighboring borough of Queens. The East Bronx was annexed by the City of New York decades later; the West Bronx in 1874, while the East Bronx remained part of Westchester County until 1895.

Unlike the West Bronx, the East Bronx has numbered streets in only a few neighborhoods. Because the Bronx uses the same street numbering system as Manhattan, streets designated as "east" (e.g., East 161st Street) may actually be located west of the Bronx River. This is because the east-west divider is Fifth Avenue in Manhattan and Jerome Avenue in the Bronx (which is directly north of Fifth Avenue), and only a relatively small area of the Bronx lies west of Jerome Avenue. Thus while all numbered streets in the East Bronx are necessarily designated "east", an "east" street designation does not automatically mean that the area in question is part of the East Bronx.

The East Bronx has historically had a large Italian American population, and they still make up the biggest group in the neighborhoods of City Island, Country Club, Morris Park, Pelham Bay, Pelham Gardens and Throggs Neck. The Northeast Bronx has a large Afro-Caribbean population, in particular in the neighborhoods of Baychester, Edenwald and Wakefield. Parkchester is home to a large Asian American population (including Bengalis, Pakistanis, and Chinese), although the Asian population at 13% is far surpassed by the Hispanic population, mostly Puerto Ricans. Throughout the East Bronx, Hispanic Americans—of Puerto Rican and Dominican heritage—can be found and they are majority populations in Castle Hill, Parkchester, Soundview, Van Nest and Westchester Square. Albanians are a presence throughout the East Bronx, in particular in Morris Park, Pelham Parkway and Van Nest.

The differences between the East and West Bronx go largely neglected today. Prior to the 1970s, New Yorkers generally saw the Bronx as being split into its eastern and western halves. With the urban decay that hit the southwestern Bronx starting in the 1960s, this traditional division received less attention. People began to see the borough as being fundamentally divided between the southwestern area (“The South Bronx”) and everywhere else. This notion became less relevant in the 21st century as crime, poverty and urban decay declined from their peaks in the late 1970s and crime rates in the South Bronx have decreased to their lowest levels since the early to mid 20th century.
