= Pelham Bay (neighborhood), Bronx =

Neighborhood in New York City

Pelham Bay
- Neighborhood of the Bronx
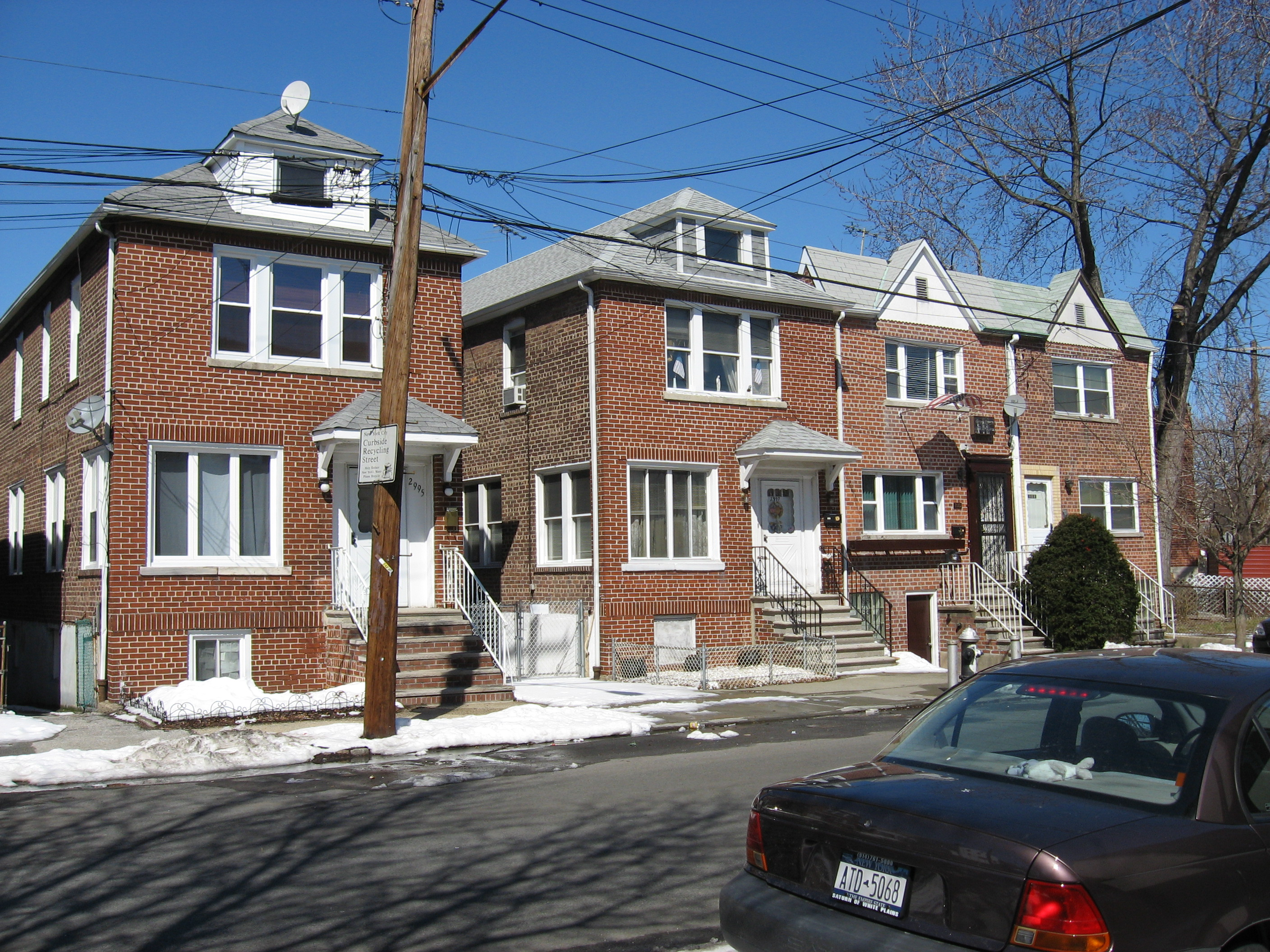
- Zulette Avenue in Pelham Bay
- Location in New York City
- Coordinates: 40.851°N 73.833°W
- Country: United States
- State: New York
- City: New York City
- Borough: The Bronx
- Community District: Bronx 10

Area
  - Total: 0.421 sq mi (1.09 km^{2})

Population (2011)
  - Total: 11,931
  - Density: 28,300/sq mi (10,900/km^{2})

Economics
  - Median income: $53,503
- ZIP Codes: 10461
- Area code: 718, 347, 929, and 917
- Website: www.pelhambay.nyc

Pelham Bay is a middle class residential neighborhood in the borough of the Bronx, in New York City. It is named for Pelham Bay Park, New York City's largest park, which lies on the neighborhood's northeastern border; and for Pelham Bay, a body of water in that park. The neighborhood is bounded roughly by Pelham Parkway on the north, the New England Thruway (I-95) on the east, the Bruckner Expressway (I-95) on the south, and the Hutchinson River Parkway on the west.

Pelham Bay is part of Bronx Community District 10, and its ZIP Code is 10461. Pelham Bay is patrolled by the 45th Precinct of the New York City Police Department.

== History ==
Most of the neighborhood is land that was purchased by Thomas Pell in 1654, part of an original grant to the Dutch West India Company.

Despite the name, the area that is now the Pelham Bay neighborhood was not part of the historical Town of Pelham, which consisted of the modern-day town of Pelham in Westchester County as well as Pelham Bay Park and City Island in the Bronx. The latter two areas were annexed by the City of New York in 1895.

== Land use ==
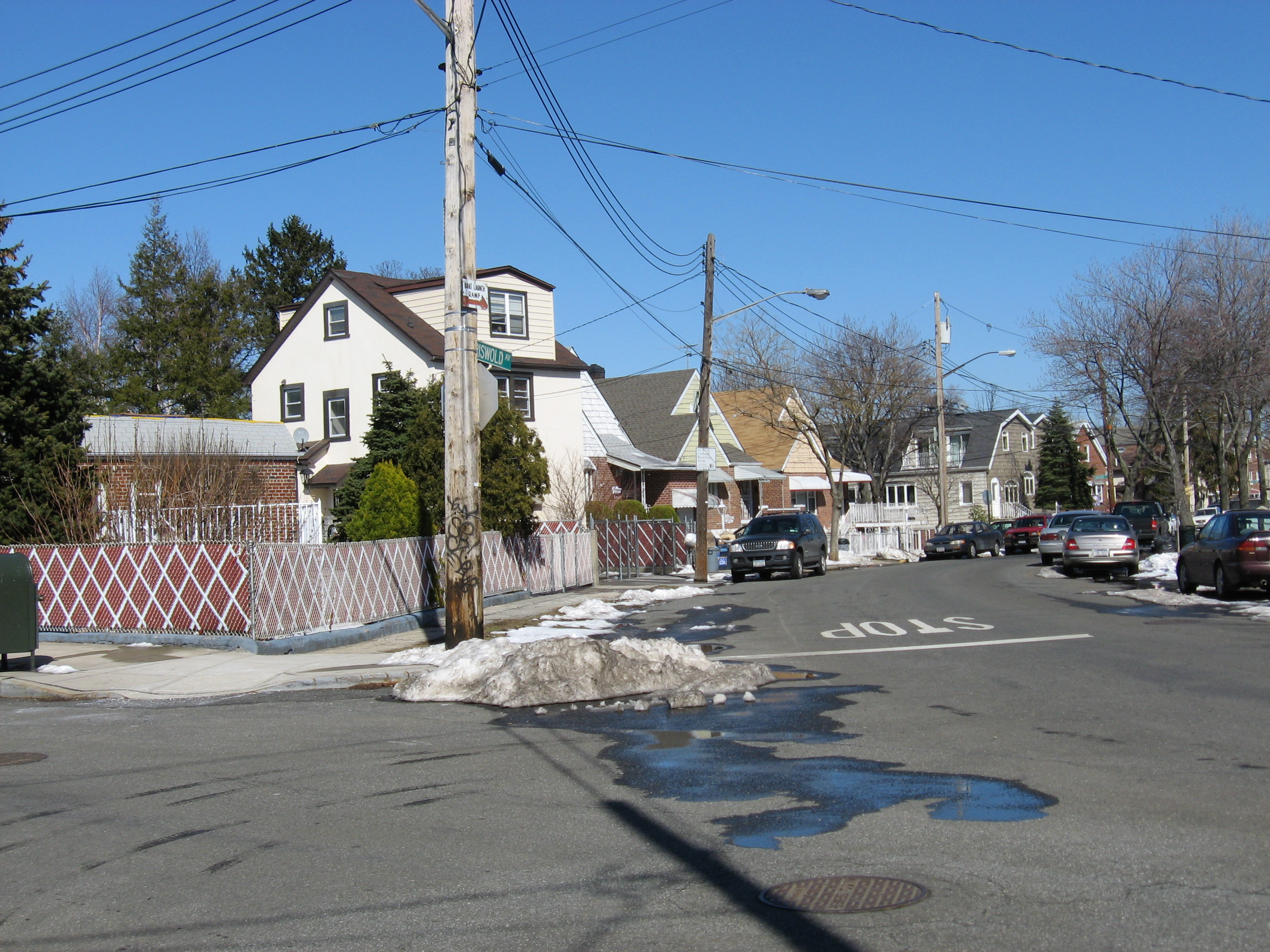
Griswold and Research Avenues in Country Club

Pelham Bay's boundaries, starting from the north and moving clockwise, are Pelham Parkway to the north, New England Thruway to the east, Bruckner Expressway to the south, and Hutchinson River Parkway to the west. Pelham Bay includes the residential enclave of Country Club, which occupies the portion of the neighborhood east of Interstate 95 (I-95). The core of Pelham Bay is the portion west of I-95 and north of Middletown Road.

Pelham Bay is part of Bronx Community District 10, which also covers Throgs Neck and Co-op City. The neighborhood is home to a number of active civic and community associations, including the Pelham Bay Little League.

A variety of stores and eateries line the streets of this neighborhood, including Westchester Avenue, Buhre Avenue, Middletown Road, and Crosby Avenue (these two cross to form one of the main intersections of the neighborhood).

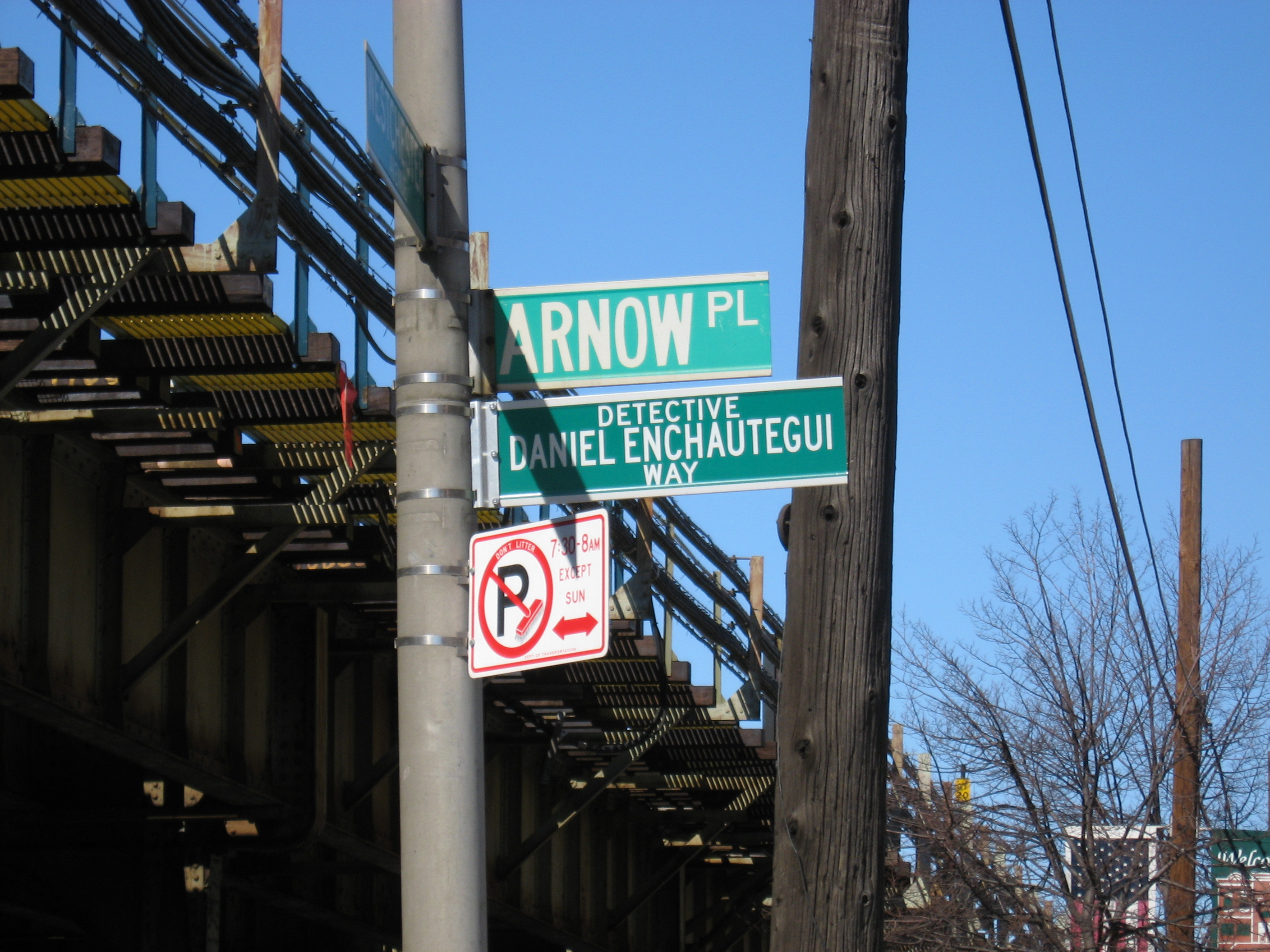
Daniel Enchautegui Way (formerly Arnow Place) in Pelham Bay, renamed in honor of a fallen police officer

Arnow Place, a small street between Westchester Avenue and the New England Thruway (I-95) in Pelham Bay, was the site of the December 2005 shooting death of off-duty police officer, Daniel Enchautegui. Actor Lillo Brancato and an accomplice were charged with murder in the case. In 2006, the street was renamed Daniel Enchautegui Way.

There is a community playground called Westchester Square Playground located adjacent to the Hutchinson River Parkway. It has a baseball field, swing sets and a paddleball court.

== Demographics ==
The neighborhood is home to a longstanding Italian American population. The neighborhood also has a sizeable population of Greeks. While the majority of the population is white, there is a significant Hispanic minority, consisting mostly of Puerto Ricans, and there has been a recent influx of Hispanics. As with Riverdale and Country Club, Pelham Bay ranks as one of the safest and most desirable neighborhoods in the Bronx. It was ranked as the best neighborhood for children in the Bronx and top 10 neighborhood in the whole New York City. There has also been a recent influx of Asians moving into the neighborhood. Real estate values in Pelham Bay have grown much faster than other residential areas in the Bronx.

Based on data from the 2010 United States census, the population of Pelham Bay-Country Club-City Island was 26,583, a decrease of 557 (2.1%) from the 27,140 counted in 2000. Covering an area of 917.45 acres (371.28 ha), the neighborhood had a population density of 29.0 inhabitants per acre (18,600/sq mi; 7,200/km^{2}). The racial makeup of the Pelham Bay-Country Club-City Island neighborhood was 62.0% (16,488) White, 2.9% (773) African American, 0.1% (36) Native American, 3.6% (969) Asian, 0.0% (5) Pacific Islander, 0.4% (110) from other races, and 0.9% (252) from two or more races. Hispanic or Latino of any race were 29.9% (7,950) of the population.

The entirety of Community District 10, which comprises City Island, Co-op City, Country Club, Pelham Bay, Schuylerville, Throgs Neck and Westchester Square, had 121,868 inhabitants as of NYC Health's 2018 Community Health Profile, with an average life expectancy of 81.1 years. This is about the same as the median life expectancy of 81.2 for all New York City neighborhoods. Most inhabitants are youth and middle-aged adults: 20% are between the ages of between 0–17, 26% between 25 and 44, and 27% between 45 and 64. The ratio of college-aged and elderly residents was lower, at 9% and 18% respectively.

As of 2017, the median household income in Community District 10 was $59,522. In 2018, an estimated 14% of Community District 10 residents lived in poverty, compared to 25% in all of the Bronx and 20% in all of New York City. One in eleven residents (9%) were unemployed, compared to 13% in the Bronx and 9% in New York City. Rent burden, or the percentage of residents who have difficulty paying their rent, is 45% in Community District 10, compared to the boroughwide and citywide rates of 58% and 51% respectively. Based on this calculation, as of 2018, Community District 10 is considered high-income relative to the rest of the city and not gentrifying.

== Police and crime ==
Community District 10 is patrolled by the 45th Precinct of the NYPD, located at 2877 Barkley Avenue in Throggs Neck. The 45th Precinct ranked 28th safest out of 69 patrol areas for per-capita crime in 2010. As of 2018, with a non-fatal assault rate of 53 per 100,000 people, Community District 10's rate of violent crimes per capita is less than that of the city as a whole. The incarceration rate of 243 per 100,000 people is lower than that of the city as a whole.

The 45th Precinct has a lower crime rate than in the 1990s, with crimes across all categories having decreased by 67% between 1990 and 2022. The precinct reported five murders, 13 rapes, 235 robberies, 265 felony assaults, 108 burglaries, 609 grand larcenies, and 323 grand larcenies auto in 2022.

== Fire safety ==
Pelham Bay is served by two fire stations of the New York City Fire Department (FDNY). Engine Co. 89/Ladder Co. 50 is located at 2924 Bruckner Boulevard while Squad 61/Battalion 20 is located at 1518 Williamsbridge Road.

== Health ==
As of 2018, preterm births are more common in Community District 10 than in other places citywide, though births to teenage mothers are less common. In Community District 10, there were 110 preterm births per 1,000 live births (compared to 87 per 1,000 citywide), and 10.3 births to teenage mothers per 1,000 live births (compared to 19.3 per 1,000 citywide). Community District 10 has a low population of residents who are uninsured. In 2018, this population of uninsured residents was estimated to be 7%, lower than the citywide rate of 14%, though this was based on a small sample size.

The concentration of fine particulate matter, the deadliest type of air pollutant, in Community District 10 is 0.0075 milligrams per cubic metre (7.5×10^{−9} oz/ft^{3}), the same as the city average. Fourteen percent of Community District 10 residents are smokers, which is the same as the city average of 14% of residents being smokers. In Community District 10, 24% of residents are obese, 13% are diabetic, and 37% have high blood pressure—compared to the citywide averages of 24%, 11%, and 28% respectively. In addition, 25% of children are obese, compared to the citywide average of 20%.

Eighty-seven percent of residents eat some fruits and vegetables every day, which is the same as the city's average of 87%. In 2018, 77% of residents described their health as "good", "very good", or "excellent", about the same as the city's average of 78%. For every supermarket in Community District 10, there are 7 bodegas.

The nearest large hospitals are Calvary Hospital, Montefiore Medical Center's Jack D. Weiler Hospital, and NYC Health + Hospitals/Jacobi in Morris Park. The Albert Einstein College of Medicine campus is also located in Morris Park.

== Post office and ZIP Code ==
Pelham Bay is located within ZIP Code 10461. The United States Postal Service operates the Pilgrim Station post office at 1545 Crosby Avenue.

== Education ==
Community District 10 generally has a lower rate of college-educated residents than the rest of the city as of 2018. While 34% of residents age 25 and older have a college education or higher, 16% have less than a high school education and 50% are high school graduates or have some college education. By contrast, 26% of Bronx residents and 43% of city residents have a college education or higher. The percentage of Community District 10 students excelling in math rose from 29% in 2000 to 47% in 2011, and reading achievement increased from 33% to 35% during the same time period.

Community District 10's rate of elementary school student absenteeism is slightly higher than the rest of New York City. In Community District 10, 21% of elementary school students missed twenty or more days per school year, a little more than the citywide average of 20%. Additionally, 75% of high school students in Community District 10 graduate on time, the same as the citywide average of 75%.

=== Schools ===
Served by the New York City Department of Education, the neighborhood is home to the elementary schools Public School 71 (named the Rose E. Scala School to honor a former principal) and Public School 14 (named the John D. Calandra School to honor a former State Senator), as well as to Herbert H. Lehman High School (right on the neighborhood's border). Several private and parochial schools also serve the neighborhood, including the Roman Catholic elementary schools associated with the church St. Theresa, and the Greek American Institute, a Greek Orthodox parochial school.

=== Library ===
The New York Public Library (NYPL)'s Pelham Bay branch is located at 3060 Middletown Road. The branch's one-story brick building opened in 1976.

== Transportation ==
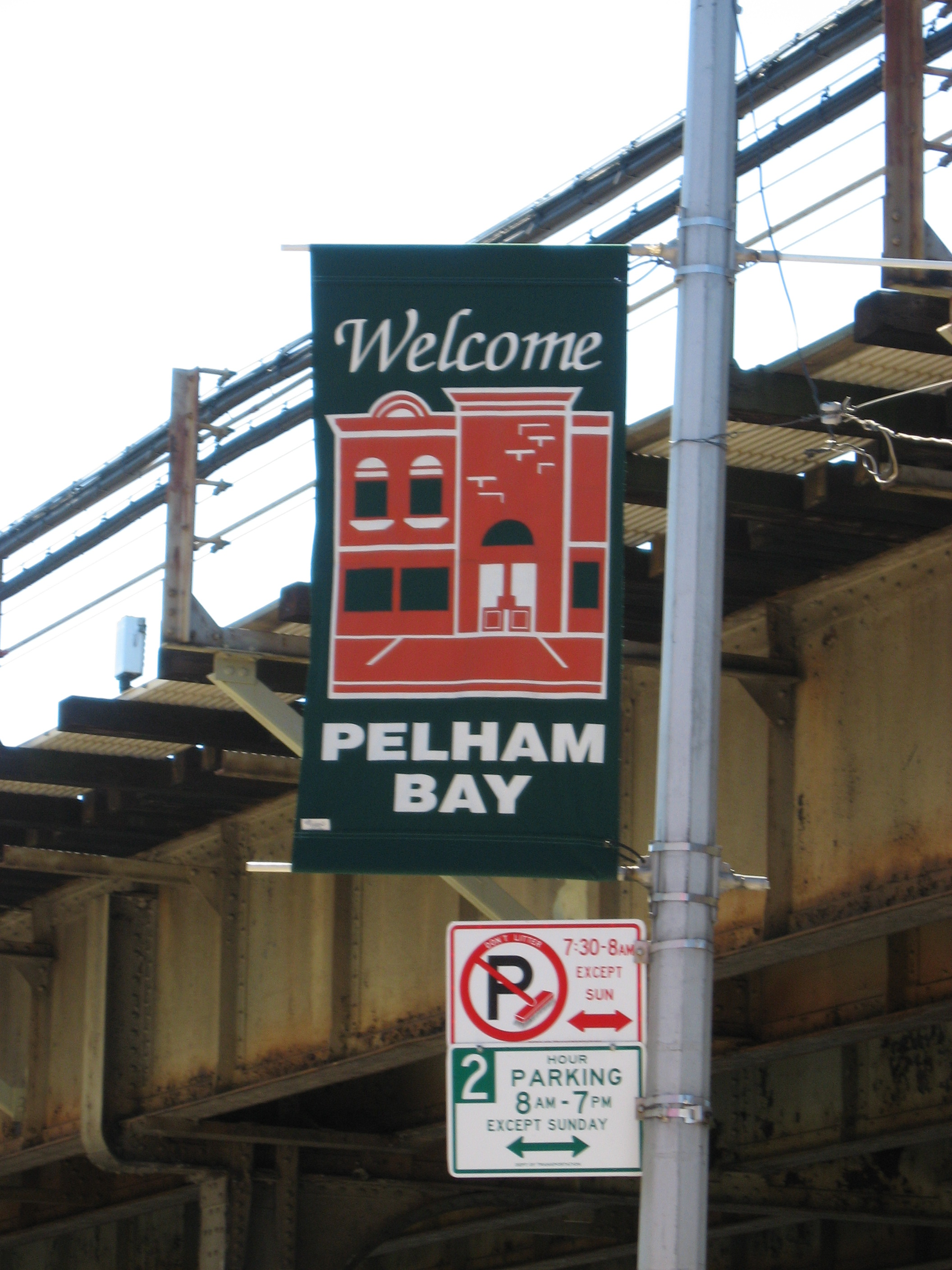
A civic promotional sign for the neighborhood, located on Westchester Avenue

The following MTA Regional Bus Operations and Bee-Line bus routes serve Pelham Bay:

- Bx5: to Bay Plaza Shopping Center or Simpson Street station (2 and 5 trains) (via Bruckner Boulevard / Story Avenue)
- Bx8: to Williamsbridge or Locust Point (via Westchester Avenue / Williamsbridge Road)
- Bx12: to University Heights (via Fordham Road – Pelham Parkway)
- Bx12 SBS: to Bay Plaza Shopping Center or Inwood – 207th Street station (A train) (via Fordham Road – Pelham Parkway)
- Bx23: to Co-op City
- Bx24: to Country Club
- Bx29: to City Island (via City Island Avenue)
- Q50: to Co-op City or Flushing–Main Street station (7 and <7> trains) (via Bronx–Whitestone Bridge)
- BxM8: to Midtown Manhattan via Bruckner Blvd and 5th Ave
- BL45: to Eastchester in Westchester County

The following New York City Subway stations serve Pelham Bay:

- Middletown Road (6 and <6> trains)
- Buhre Avenue (6 and <6> trains)
- Pelham Bay Park (6 and <6> trains)
- Westchester Square–East Tremont Avenue (6 and <6> trains), is on the border of Pelham Bay and is within walking distance.

== Notable people ==
- Paul Attanasio (born 1959), screenwriter and film and television producer, who was an executive producer on the TV series House and received Academy Award nominations for his screenplays for Quiz Show and Donnie Brasco.
- James Coco (1930–1987), actor known for his roles in Man of La Mancha and Only When I Laugh.
- John Fox (1952–1990), novelist and short-story writer.
- John F. Good (1936–2016), FBI agent who created the Abscam sting operation in the late 1970s and early 1980s which led to the arrest and conviction of several elected officials at the local, state and federal level, which was portrayed in the 2013 film American Hustle.
- James Madio (born 1975), actor known for his roles in USA High, Hook and Band of Brothers.
- Ronnie Ortiz-Magro (born 1985), actor best known as one of the eight main cast members in the MTV reality series Jersey Shore.
- Thomas Pell (1612–1669), physician who bought the area known as Pelham, New York.

== In popular culture ==
The movie The Taking of Pelham One Two Three, and its 2009 remake, involved the hijacking of a subway train leaving the Pelham Bay Park station at the scheduled time of 1:23.
