= Bronx Community Board 10 =

Bronx Community District 10 Bronx Community Board 10
- Community District
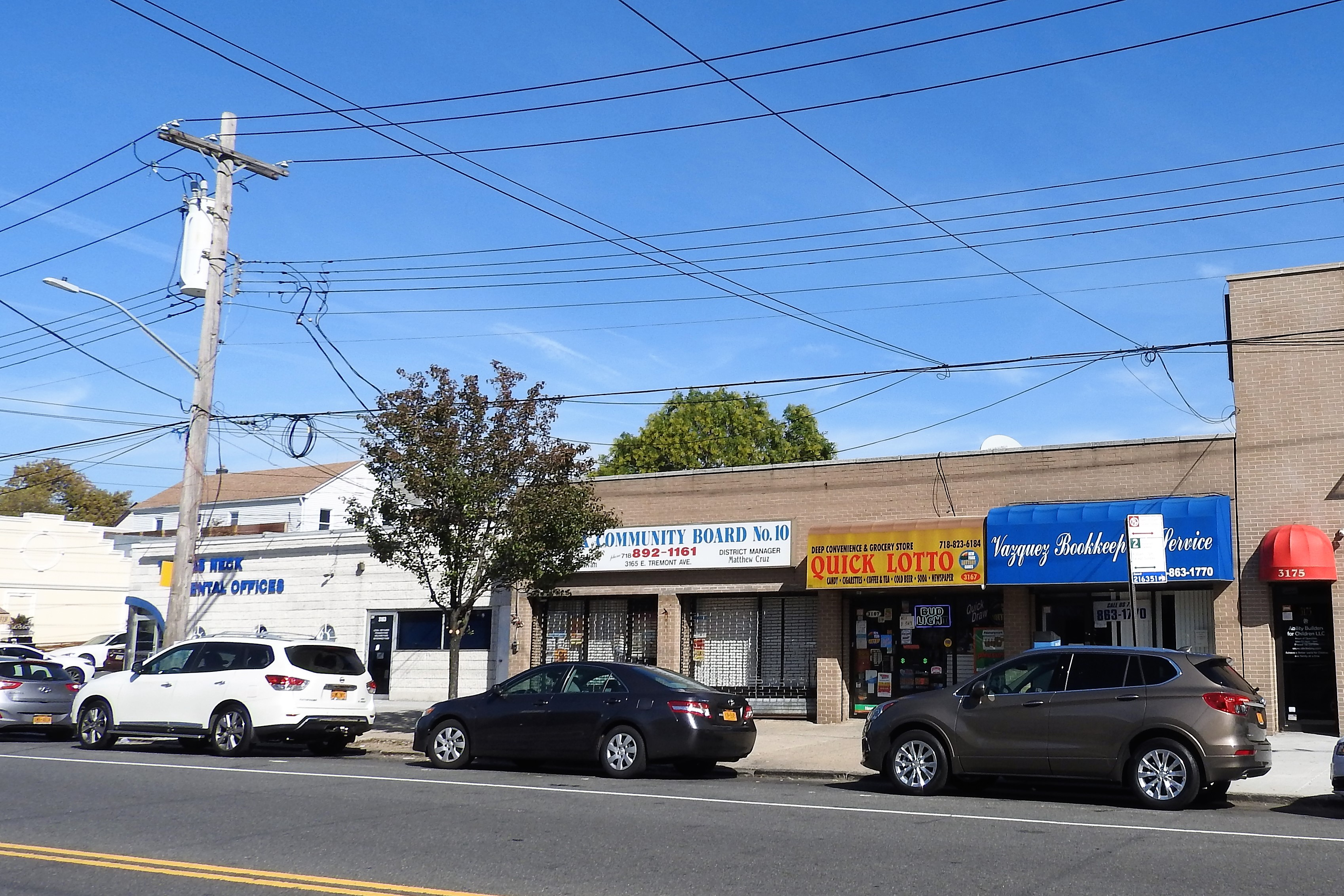

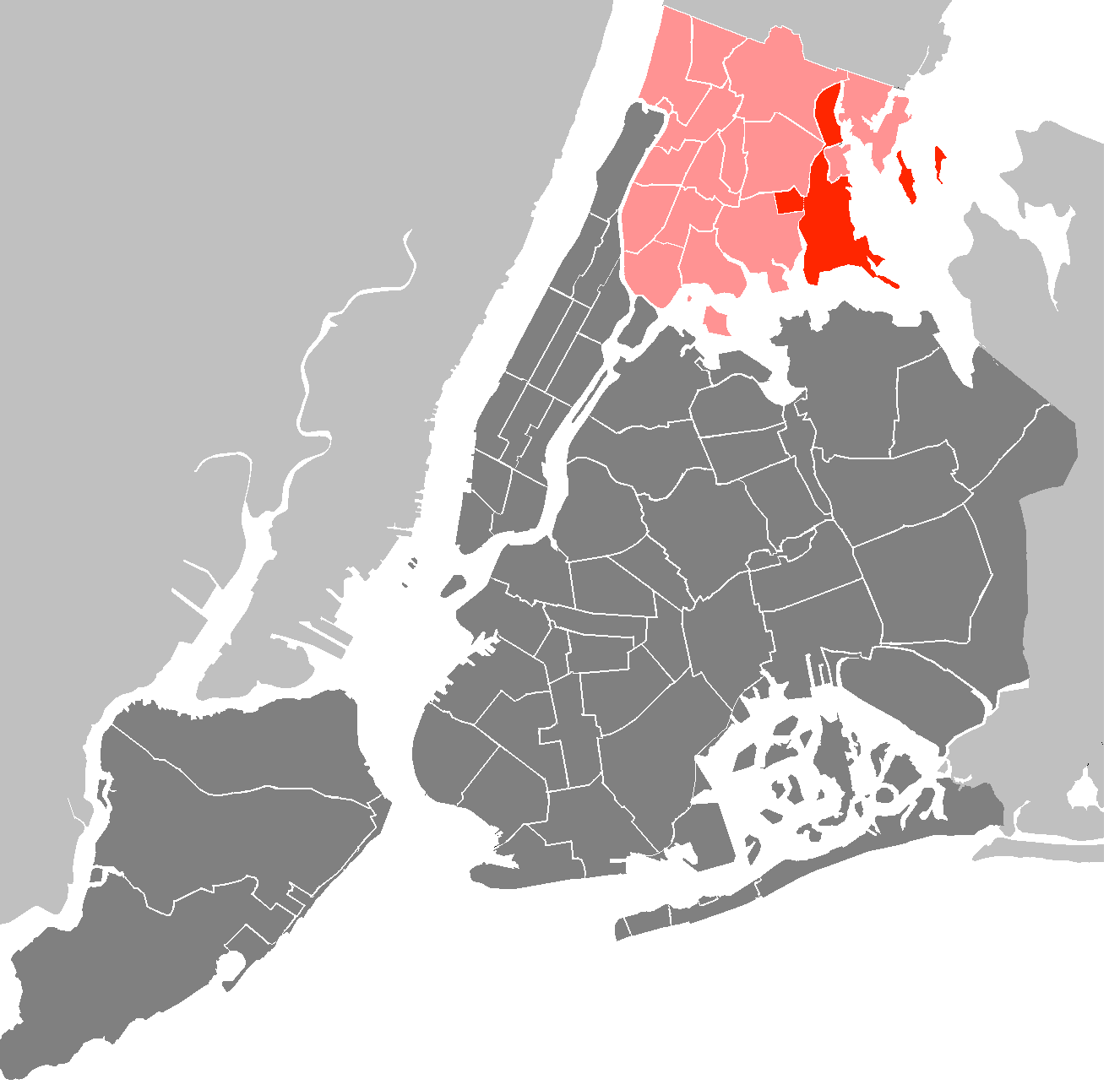
- Location in The Bronx
- Country: United States
- State: New York
- City: New York City
- Borough: The Bronx
- Neighborhoods: list: City Island; Co-op City; Country Club; Pelham Bay; Schuylerville; Throggs Neck; Westchester Square

Government
  - Type: Community board
  - Body: Bronx Community Board 10
  - Chairperson: Joseph Russo
  - District Manager: Matthew Cruz

Area
  - Total: 6.7 sq mi (17 km^{2})

Population (2000)
  - Total: 115,948
  - Density: 17,000/sq mi (6,700/km^{2})

Ethnicity
  - Hispanic and Latino Americans: 36.2%
  - African-American: 27.2%
  - White: 48.9%
  - Asian: 3%
  - Others: 0.5%
  - American Indian or Alaska Native: 0.1%
- Time zone: UTC−5 (Eastern)
  - Summer (DST): UTC−4 (EDT)
- ZIP codes: 10461, 10465, 10467, and 10475
- Area codes: 718, 347, and 929, and 917
- Police Precincts: 45th (website)
- Website: www1.nyc.gov/site/bronxcb10/index.page

Bronx Community Board 10 is a local government unit of the New York City borough of the Bronx, encompassing the neighborhoods of City Island, Co-op City, Pelham Bay, Throggs Neck and Westchester Square. It is delimited by the Hutchinson River and Pelham Bay Park to the east, New England Thruway, Hutchinson River Parkway, and Westchester Creek to the west, the Bronx/Westchester County Line to the north and the East River to the south.

== Community board staff and membership ==
The current chairperson of the Bronx Community Board 10 is Joseph Russo. Its district manager is Socrates Solano.

The City Council members representing the community district are non-voting, ex officio board members. The council members and their council districts are:

- 12th NYC Council District - Kevin Riley
- 13th NYC Council District - Kristy Marmorato
- 18th NYC Council District - Amanda Farias

== Demographics ==
As of the United States 2000 Census, the Community Board has a population of 115,948, up from 108,093 in 1990 and 106,516 in 1980. Of them, 22,754 (19.6%) are Black, 56,063 (48.4%) are White, non-Hispanic, 3,462 (3%) are Asian or Pacific Islander, 164 (0.1%) American Indian or Alaska Native, 525 (0.5%) are some other race, and 2,172 (1.9%) of two or more races. 30,808 (26.6%) are of Hispanic origin.
