= Locust Point, Bronx =

Neighborhood in New York City

Locust Point
- Neighborhood of the Bronx
- Interactive map of Locust Point
- Coordinates: 40.816°N 73.802°W
- Country: United States
- State: New York
- City: New York City
- Borough: The Bronx
- Community District: The Bronx 10

Area
  - Total: 0.416 sq mi (1.08 km^{2})

Population (2011)
  - Total: 1,479
  - Density: 3,560/sq mi (1,370/km^{2})

Economics
  - Median income: $85,072
- Time zone: UTC−05:00 (Eastern (EST))
  - Summer (DST): UTC−04:00 (Eastern (EDT))
- ZIP Codes: 10465
- Area code: 718, 347, 929, and 917
- Website: www.locustpoint.nyc

Locust Point (also Pirate Cove) is a small, peninsular neighborhood in the southeastern portion of the New York City borough of the Bronx. It is bounded by Harding Avenue on the north, the Throgs Neck Bridge to the east, and Eastchester Bay. The neighborhood is part of Bronx Community District 10. The area contains single-family houses, populated ethnically by Irish, German, and Italian families. A famous former resident of Locust Point is Michael Kay, the Yankees TV broadcaster on the YES Network and radio talk show host on 1050 ESPN radio. The Locust Point Yacht club occupies the outermost block before the bay.

Locust Point used to be an island called Locust Island, however, the waterway that separated it from mainland Bronx was filled in and built upon. After it was no longer an island, its name was changed. Part of the landfill was for the bridge's northern ramp and toll plaza. Before it was Locust Island, it was called Wrights Island because it was owned by Captain J. T. Wright.
