= Morris Park, Bronx =

Neighborhood in New York City

Morris Park
- Neighborhood of the Bronx
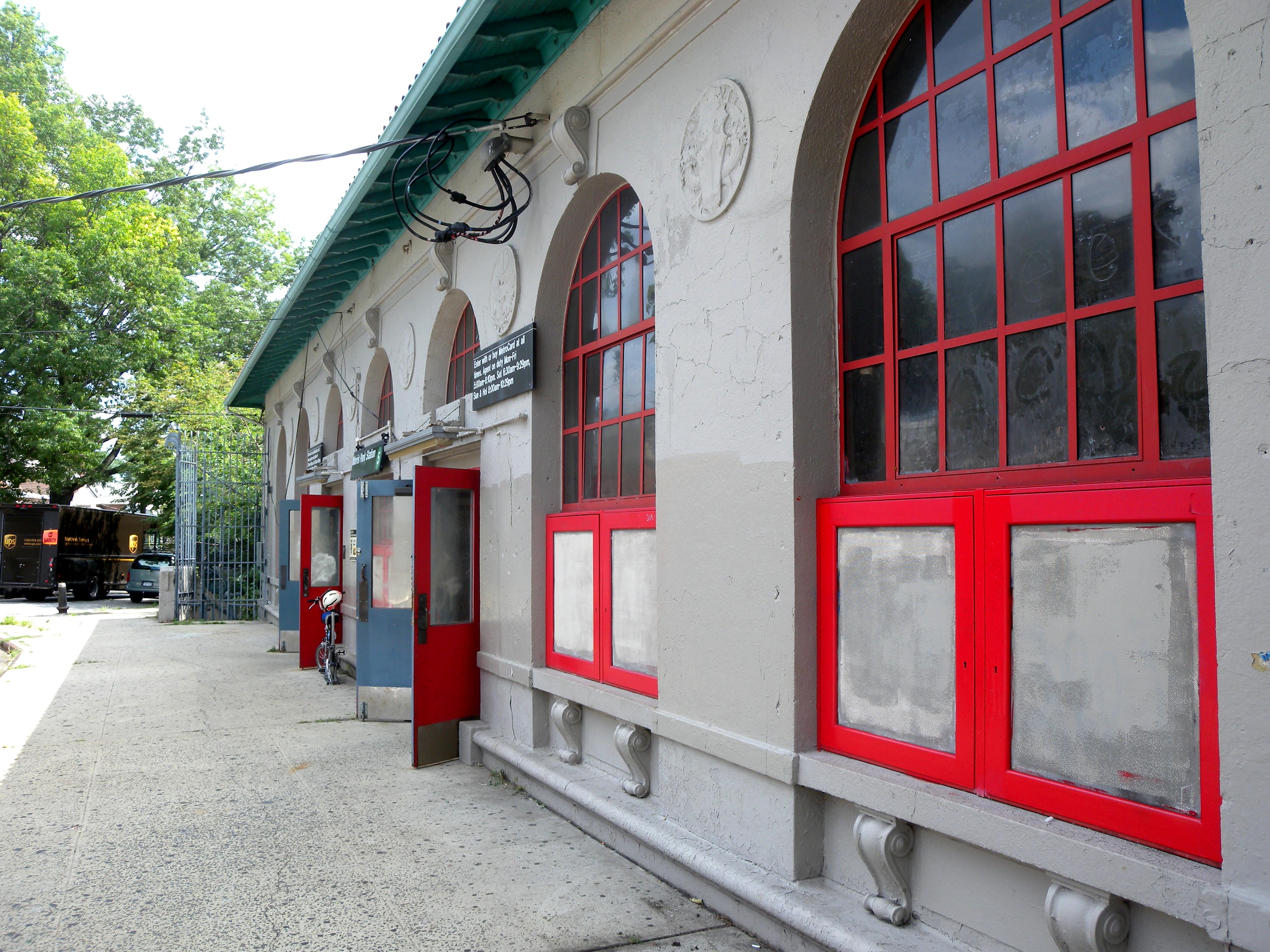
- Looking south along facade of the Morris Park station
- Location in New York City
- Coordinates: 40°51′1″N 73°51′5″W
- Country: United States
- State: New York
- City: New York City
- Borough: The Bronx
- Community District: Bronx 11

Area
  - Total: 0.347 sq mi (0.90 km^{2})

Population (2020)
  - Total: 25,077
  - Density: 72,300/sq mi (27,900/km^{2})

Economics
  - Median income: $57,240
- ZIP Codes: 10461, 10462
- Area code: 718, 347, 929, and 917
- Website: www.morrispark.nyc

Morris Park is a neighborhood in the New York City borough of the Bronx. Its approximate boundaries, starting from the north and moving clockwise, are Neill Avenue and Pelham Parkway to the north, Eastchester Road to the east, the Amtrak Northeast Corridor tracks and Sackett Avenue to the east and south, and Bronxdale Avenue and White Plains Road to the west. It borders the neighborhoods of Van Nest to its southwest, Parkchester and Westchester Square to its south, and Pelham Parkway to its northeast. Williamsbridge Road and Morris Park Avenue are the primary thoroughfares.

The neighborhood is part of Bronx Community District 11 in the East Bronx, and its ZIP Codes include 10461 and 10462. The area is patrolled by the 49th Precinct of the New York City Police Department, located at 2121 Eastchester Road. The local subway is the IRT Dyre Avenue Line (5 train), which runs under the Esplanade. The neighborhood has a large Albanian American and Italian American population.

== History ==
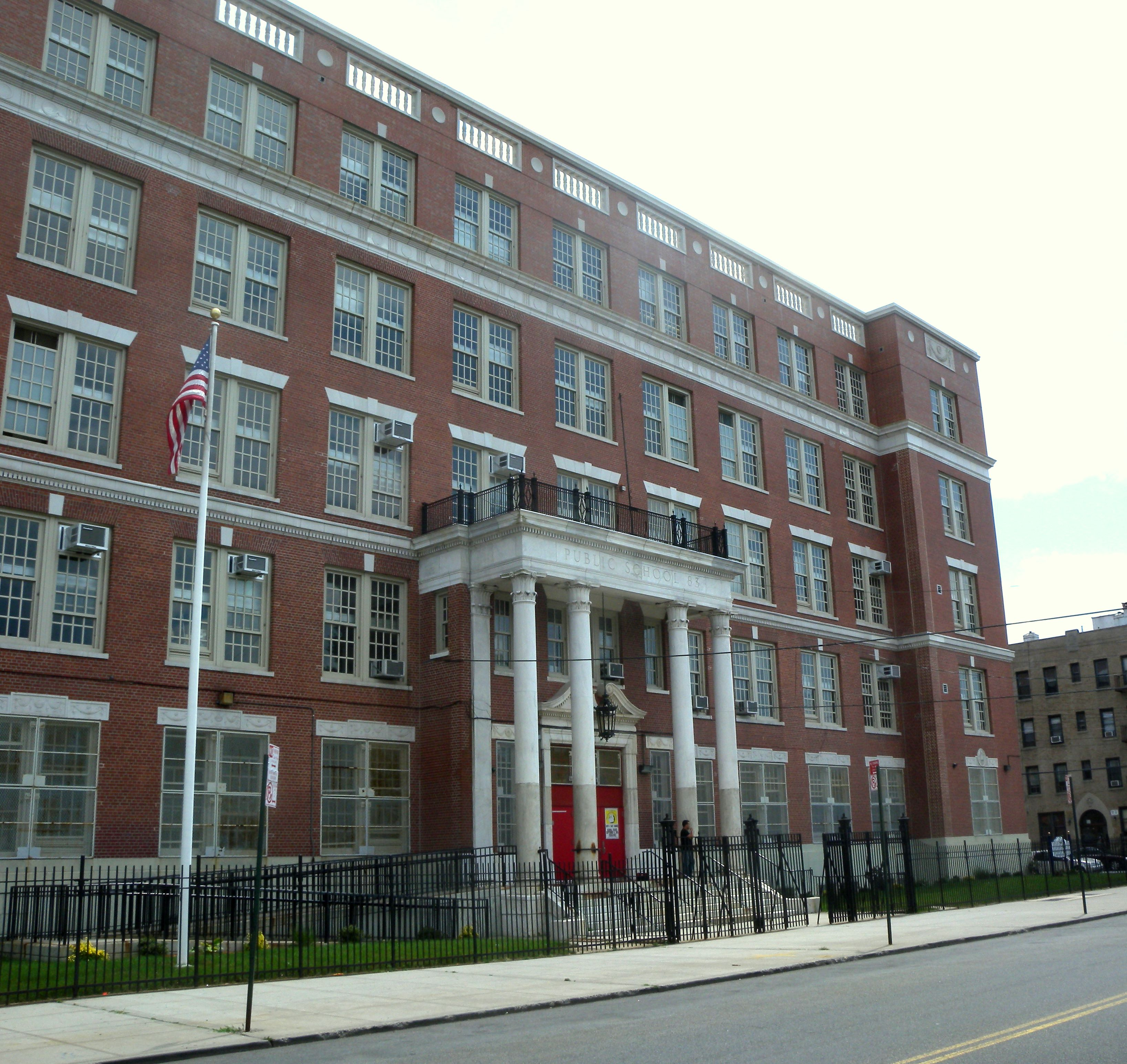
Public School 83

Morris Park is named after John Albert Morris, who built the Morris Park Racecourse, which existed from 1889 until 1910. In 1890, the Morris Park Racecourse hosted both the Preakness and the Belmont Stakes; the latter continued to be run there until 1905. The track was later used for auto racing and was the site of the first public air show. After a 1910 fire, the property was divided into lots for the current neighborhood. Several streets in Morris Park, including Cruger, Holland, Radcliff, Colden, Paulding, and Hone Avenues, are named after mayors of New York City during the 18th and 19th centuries.

In August 2024, the New York City Council voted to rezone 46 city blocks in Morris Park, Van Nest, and Parkchester, around the Metro-North Railroad's Parkchester/Van Nest and Morris Park stations, as part of the Penn Station Access project. The city government also promised to spend $500 million on infrastructure upgrades around these stations. The rezoning was intended to encourage development around these stations. As a result, up to 7,000 housing units could be constructed in the three neighborhoods.

== Land use and terrain ==
Housing in Morris Park is mostly one and two family homes of various styles. The neighborhood also has several apartment buildings. The area is low-lying and relatively flat.

The northern section of Morris Park nearest Jacobi Medical Center is also referred to as Indian Village. Several streets are named after Native American tribes, including Choctaw Place, Narragansett Avenue, Seminole Avenue, and Pawnee Place.

== Demographics ==
Morris Park, which is stipulated as Neighborhood Tabulation Area BX1102 by the New York City Department of City Planning, had 25,077 inhabitants based on data from the 2020 United States Census and covered an area of 829.6 acres (335.7 ha). This was an increase of 2,164 persons (9.4%) from the 22,913 counted in 2010. The neighborhood had a population density of 35.7 inhabitants per acre (14,500/sq mi; 5,600/km2).

The racial makeup of the neighborhood was 42.5% (10,649) White (Non-Hispanic), 6.7% (1,675) Black (Non-Hispanic), 14.1% (3,540) Asian, 1.4% (361) from some other race, and 2.1% (538) from two or more races. Hispanic or Latino of any race were 33.2% (8,314) of the population.

According to the 2020 United States Census, Morris Park has many cultural communities of over 1,000 inhabitants. These groups are residents who identify as Dominican, Puerto Rican, Albanian, Irish, Italian, and African American.

Most inhabitants are middle-aged adults: 50.2% are between 24–54 years old. 64.6% of the households had at least one family present. Out of the 9,173 households, 39.4% had a married couple (16.4% with a child under 18), 5.8% had a cohabiting couple (2.3% with a child under 18), 21.3% had a single male (1.8% with a child under 18), and 33.6% had a single female (5.8% with a child under 18). 31.1% of households had children. In Morris Park 65.8% of non-vacant housing units are renter-occupied.

The entirety of Community District 11, which comprises Morris Park and Allerton, had 116,180 inhabitants as of NYC Health's 2018 Community Health Profile, with an average life expectancy of 79.9 years. This is lower than the median life expectancy of 81.2 for all New York City neighborhoods. Most inhabitants are youth and middle-aged adults: 22% are between the ages of between 0–17, 30% between 25 and 44, and 24% between 45 and 64. The ratio of college-aged and elderly residents was lower, at 9% and 14% respectively.

As of 2017, the median household income in Community District 11 was $48,018. In 2018, an estimated 21% of Morris Park and Allerton residents lived in poverty, compared to 25% in all of the Bronx and 20% in all of New York City. One in eight residents (12%) were unemployed, compared to 13% in the Bronx and 9% in New York City. Rent burden, or the percentage of residents who have difficulty paying their rent, is 55% in Morris Park and Allerton, compared to the boroughwide and citywide rates of 58% and 51% respectively. Based on this calculation, as of 2018, Morris Park and Allerton are considered high-income relative to the rest of the city and not gentrifying.

=== Culture ===
The neighborhood has a large Italian-American population, and since the early 2000s, has also had a large Albanian-American population with some Asian and Hispanic representation. Morris Park has always been predominantly Italian. It is generally more suburban than other neighborhoods in the Bronx.

Italian-American residents have close ties to their heritage. After Italy's World Cup victory in 2006, over 30,000 flocked to the neighborhood for an all-day party. Since then, Morris Park has gained a rival reputation with Arthur Avenue for the prototypical Italian-American neighborhood in the Bronx. Morris Park has one of the highest percentage of Italian populations in the city, along with Bensonhurst in Brooklyn and Staten Island.

Morris Park is famous for its annual Columbus Day parade, which began in 1977 to honor Christopher Columbus. It is held on the Sunday before the national Columbus Day holiday. Rudolph Giuliani, Michael Bloomberg, and Bill de Blasio have attended as mayors. The procession begins at the intersection of Morris Park Avenue and White Plains Road, marches east on Morris Park Avenue, turns north on Williamsbridge Road, and ends at Pelham Parkway South. The reviewing stand, where the local dignitaries, politicians, civic and business leaders, and grand marshal sit, is located on Williamsbridge Road between Lydig and Neill avenues. Past Grand Marshals have included actors Tony LoBianco, Chazz Palminteri, television personality Regis Philbin, and former New York Yankees first baseman Joe Pepitone.

== Politics ==
Politically, Morris Park is in New York's 14th congressional district, represented by Democrat Alexandria Ocasio-Cortez as of 2019. It is also part of the 34th State Senate district, represented by Democrat Nathalia Fernandez, and the 80th State Assembly district, represented by Democrat John Zaccaro Jr. Morris Park is located in New York's 13th City Council district, represented by Kristy Marmorato, a Republican.

A reflection of its heavily Italian-American and Catholic population, Morris Park was politically conservative and remained one of the Bronx's few solidly Republican neighborhoods until the 1990s. It was represented in the United States Congress from 1953 to 1969 by Paul Fino, a Republican, and then from 1969 to 1988 by Mario Biaggi, a socially conservative and law and order Democrat. Republican State Senators such as John D. Calandra and Guy Velella drew extensive support from Morris Park residents. In his three mayoral campaigns in 1989, 1993, and 1997, Rudy Giuliani, a Republican, carried Morris Park by substantial margins. In recent years, changing demographics have altered the neighborhood's political landscape.

== Notable locations ==
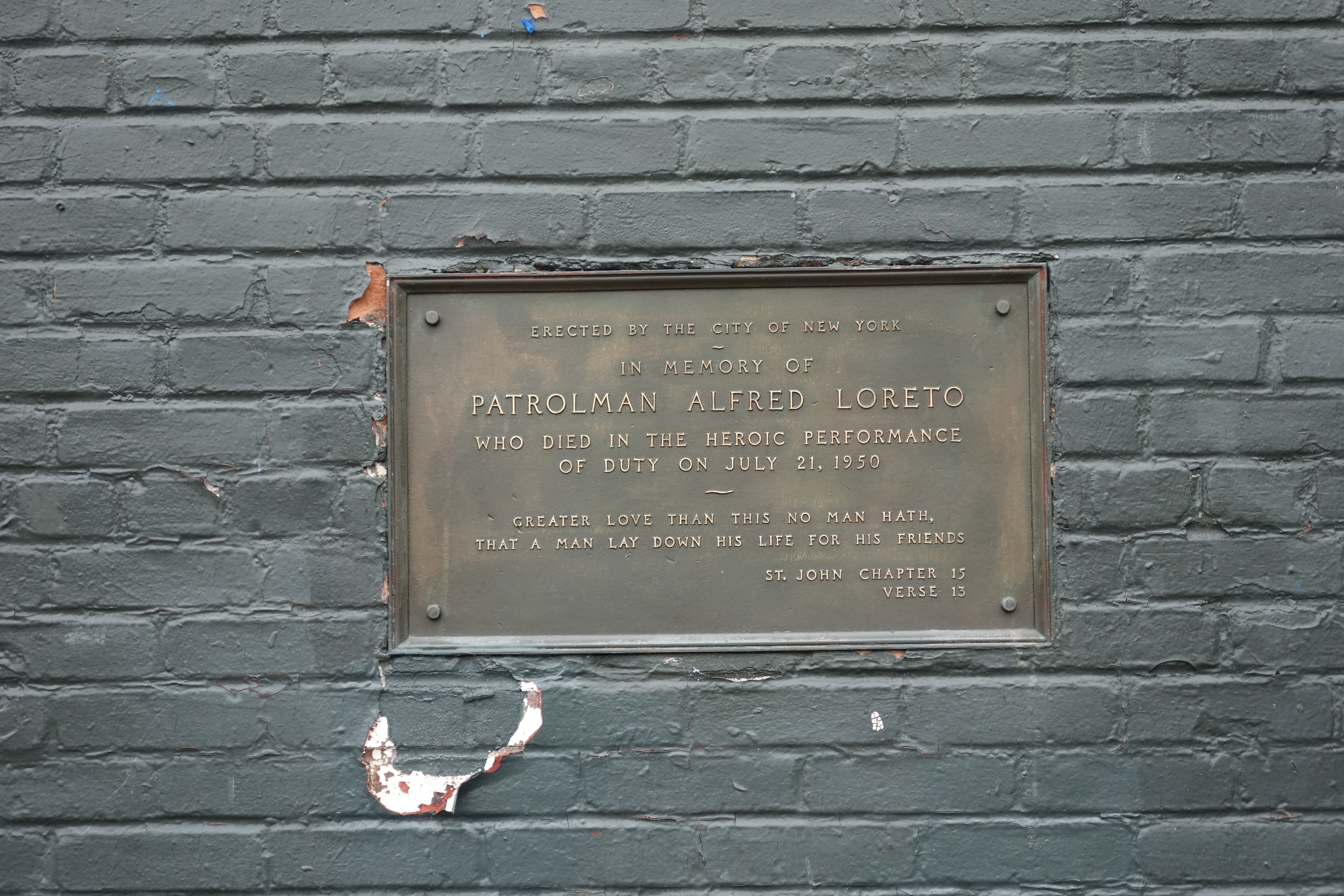
A plaque honoring Officer Alfred Loreto inside Loreto Park.

The Albert Einstein College of Medicine, Jacobi Medical Center, and the Jack D. Weiler Hospital division of Montefiore Medical Center are located on the eastern edge of the neighborhood. The neighborhood is also home to Bronx Psychiatric Center and Calvary Hospital. St. Francis Xavier School and St. Clare of Assisi School are two local Catholic schools. Our Savior Lutheran School, P.S. 83, and P.S. 108 are other local schools.

Loreto Park, bounded by Morris Park, Haight, Van Nest, and Tomlinson Avenues, was named after Alfred Loreto, a police officer who lived nearby at 1870 Hering Avenue and was killed on July 21, 1950, while foiling an attempted kidnapping of his neighbor. It underwent a large renovation that was completed in 2012. Councilman James Vacca allocated $500,000 from the New York City Council for the reconstruction. Additions included a play area for toddlers, wheelchair accessible equipment, planting beds, new benches, fencing, and game tables. The bocce court was renovated, and a roller hockey rink was added. However, the Morris Park Hockey League folded several years later and the rink quickly became underutilized, leading to another major reconstruction project costing $2,000,000 that was scheduled for completion in September 2021. However, there were considerable construction delays and the park did not re-open until April 2022.

Joseph Garofalo, a World War II veteran, persuaded John Dormi & Sons Funeral Home on Morris Park Avenue to display his collection of medals and war memorabilia and named it the Bronx Military Museum. People in the neighborhood have also contributed military memorabilia that belonged to their relatives.

== Police and crime ==
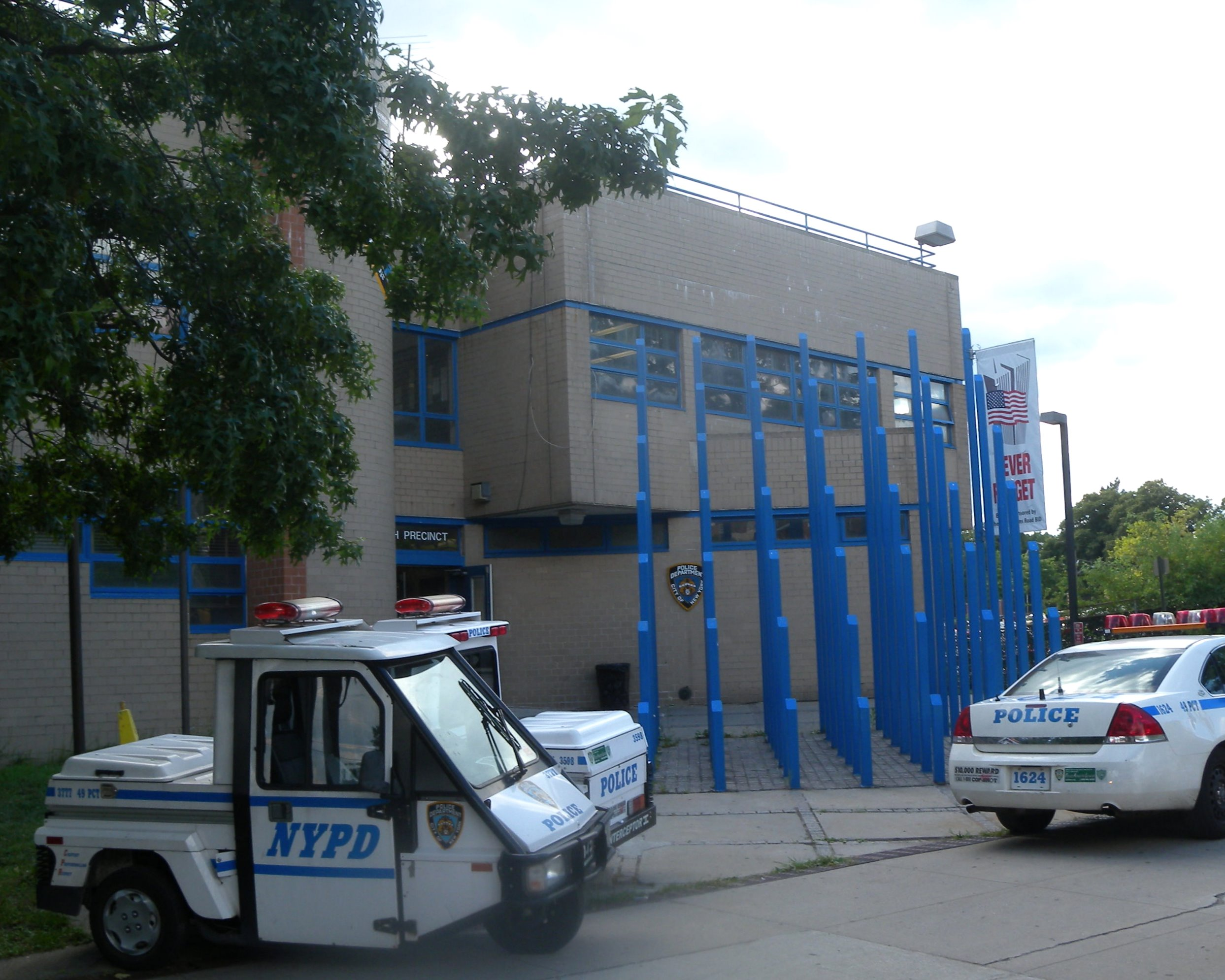
49th Precinct

Morris Park and Allerton are patrolled by the 49th Precinct of the New York City Police Department, located at 2121 Eastchester Road. The 49th Precinct ranked 43rd safest out of 69 patrol areas for per-capita crime in 2010. As of 2018, with a non-fatal assault rate of 64 per 100,000 people, Morris Park and Allerton's rate of violent crimes per capita is slightly more than that of the city as a whole. The incarceration rate of 372 per 100,000 people is lower than that of the city as a whole.

The 49th Precinct has a lower crime rate than in the 1990s, with crimes across all categories having decreased by 71.7% between 1990 and 2022. The precinct reported 7 murders, 17 rapes, 273 robberies, 367 felony assaults, 133 burglaries, 611 grand larcenies, and 371 grand larcenies auto in 2022.

== Fire safety ==
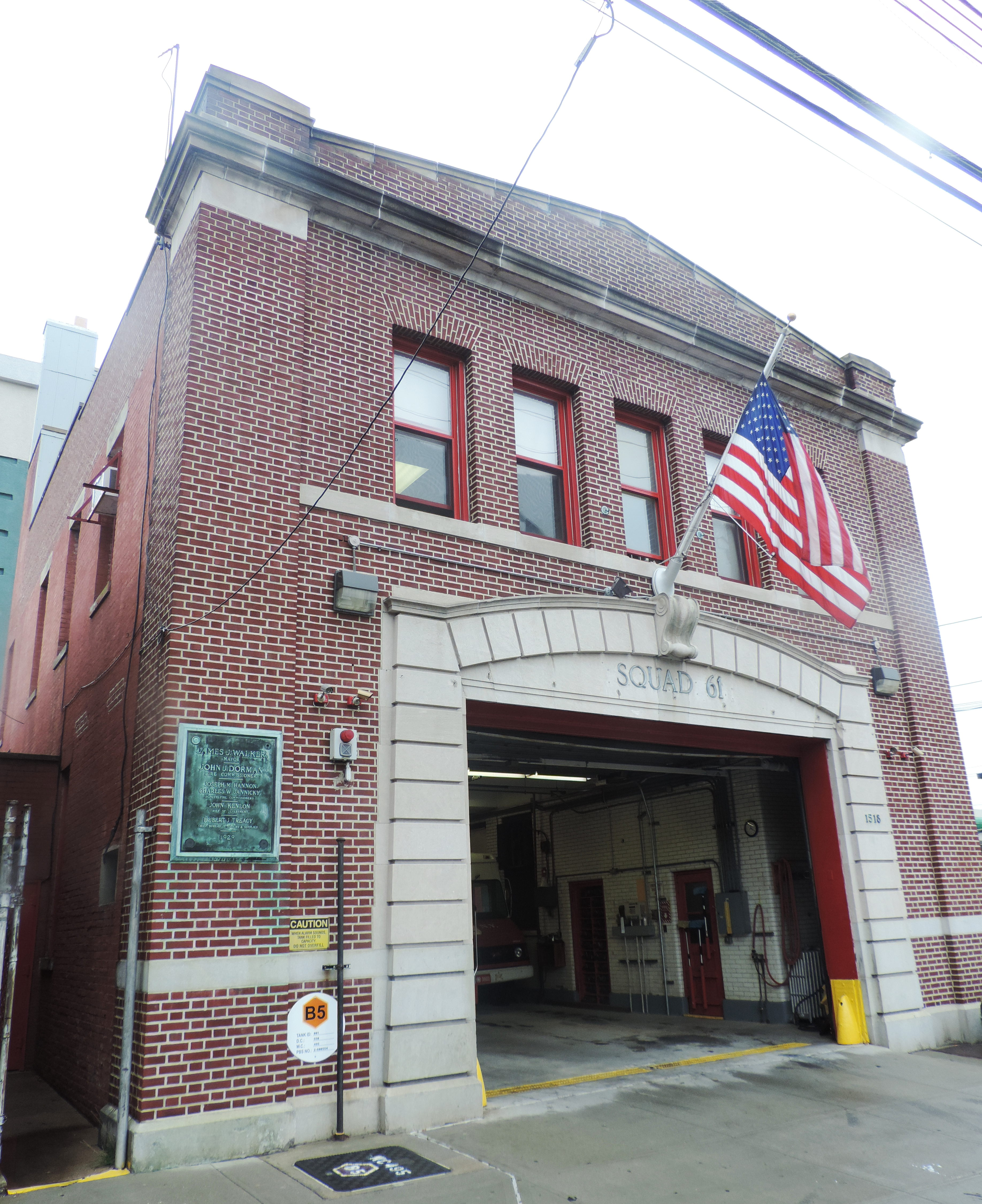
Squad 61

Morris Park is served by the New York City Fire Department's Squad 61/Battalion 20, located at 1518 Williamsbridge Road. Engine Company 97 is located just outside Morris Park at 1454 Astor Avenue. Also just off Morris Park Avenue is Engine 90/Ladder 41 located at 1843 White Plains Road. In addition, the Fire Department's Emergency Medical Service's Station 20 is located on the grounds of Jacobi Medical Center.

== Health ==
As of 2018, preterm births and births to teenage mothers are slightly more common in Morris Park and Allerton than in other places citywide. In Morris Park and Allerton, there were 90 preterm births per 1,000 live births (compared to 87 per 1,000 citywide), and 19.7 births to teenage mothers per 1,000 live births (compared to 19.3 per 1,000 citywide). Morris Park and Allerton has a low population of residents who are uninsured. In 2018, this population of uninsured residents was estimated to be 12%, the same as the citywide rate of 12%.

The concentration of fine particulate matter, the deadliest type of air pollutant, in Morris Park and Allerton is 0.0074 milligrams per cubic metre (7.4×10^{−9} oz/ft^{3}), less than the city average. Fifteen percent of Morris Park and Allerton residents are smokers, which is slightly higher than the city average of 14% of residents being smokers. In Morris Park and Allerton, 32% of residents are obese, 14% are diabetic, and 31% have high blood pressure—compared to the citywide averages of 24%, 11%, and 28% respectively. In addition, 23% of children are obese, compared to the citywide average of 20%.

Eighty-three percent of residents eat some fruits and vegetables every day, which is lower than the city's average of 87%. In 2018, 80% of residents described their health as "good", "very good", or "excellent", slightly higher than the city's average of 78%. For every supermarket in Morris Park and Allerton, there are 17 bodegas.

The nearest large hospitals are Calvary Hospital, Montefiore Medical Center's Jack D. Weiler Hospital, and Jacobi Hospital. The Albert Einstein College of Medicine campus is also located in Morris Park.

== Post office and ZIP Codes ==
Morris Park is located within ZIP Codes 10461 east of Paulding Avenue and 10462 west of Paulding Avenue. The United States Postal Service operates the Morris Park Station post office at 1807 Williamsbridge Road.

== Education ==
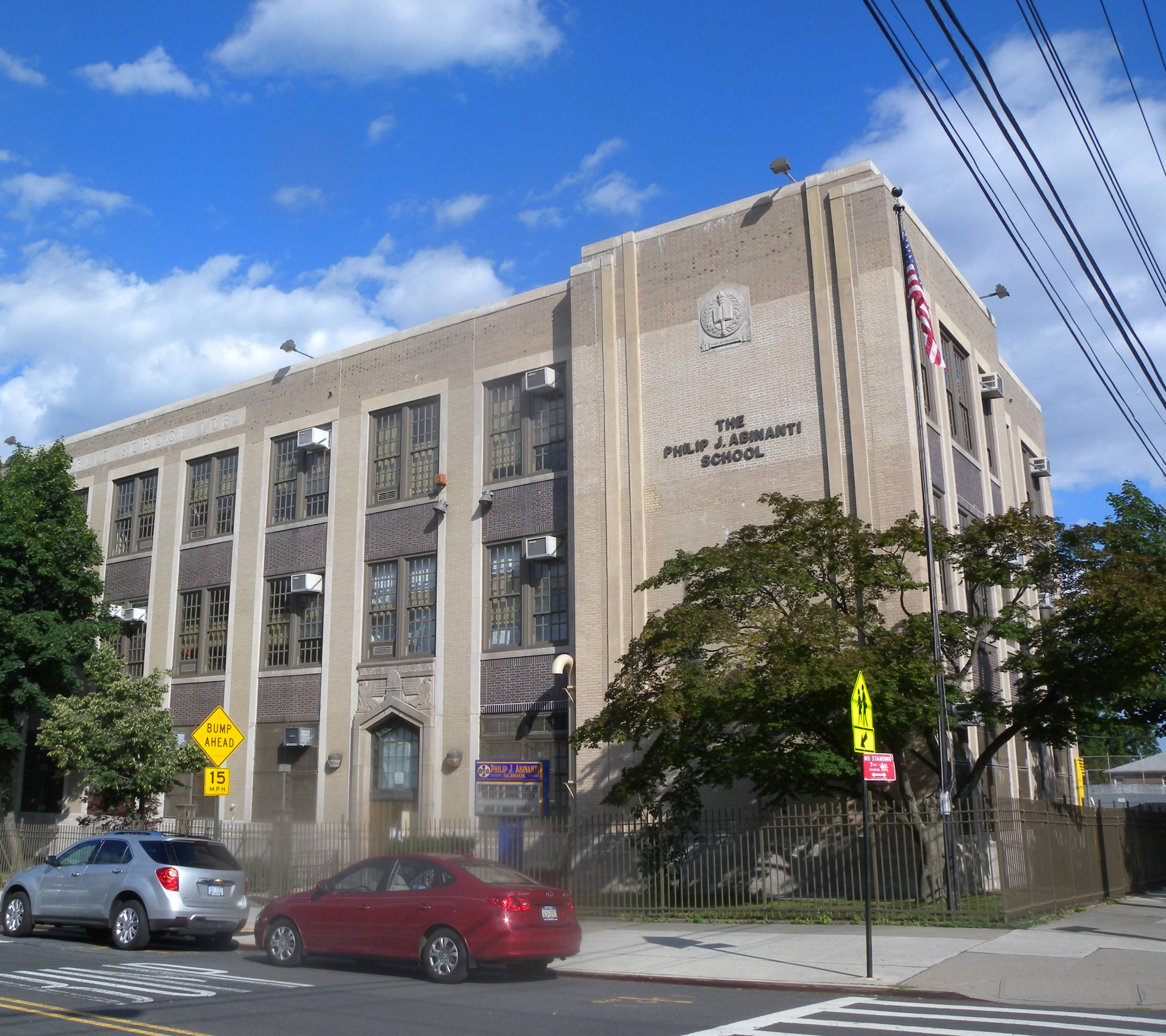
Philip J Abinanti School

Morris Park and Allerton generally have a lower rate of college-educated residents than the rest of the city as of 2018. While 32% of residents age 25 and older have a college education or higher, 24% have less than a high school education and 44% are high school graduates or have some college education. By contrast, 26% of Bronx residents and 43% of city residents have a college education or higher. The percentage of Morris Park and Allerton students excelling in math rose from 32% in 2000 to 48% in 2011, though reading achievement remained constant at 37% during the same time period.

Morris Park and Allerton's rate of elementary school student absenteeism is slightly higher than the rest of New York City. In Morris Park and Allerton, 23% of elementary school students missed twenty or more days per school year, a little more than the citywide average of 20%. Additionally, 74% of high school students in Morris Park and Allerton graduate on time, about the same as the citywide average of 75%.

=== Schools ===
The New York City Department of Education operates the following public schools in Morris Park:

- P.S. 83 Donald Hertz (grades K–8)
- P.S. 105 Senator Abraham Bernstein (grades PK–5)
- P.S. 108 Philip J. Abinanti (grades PK–5)
- P.S./M.S. 498 Van Nest Academy (grades K–8)
- Bronx High School for the Visual Arts (grades 9–12)

=== Library ===
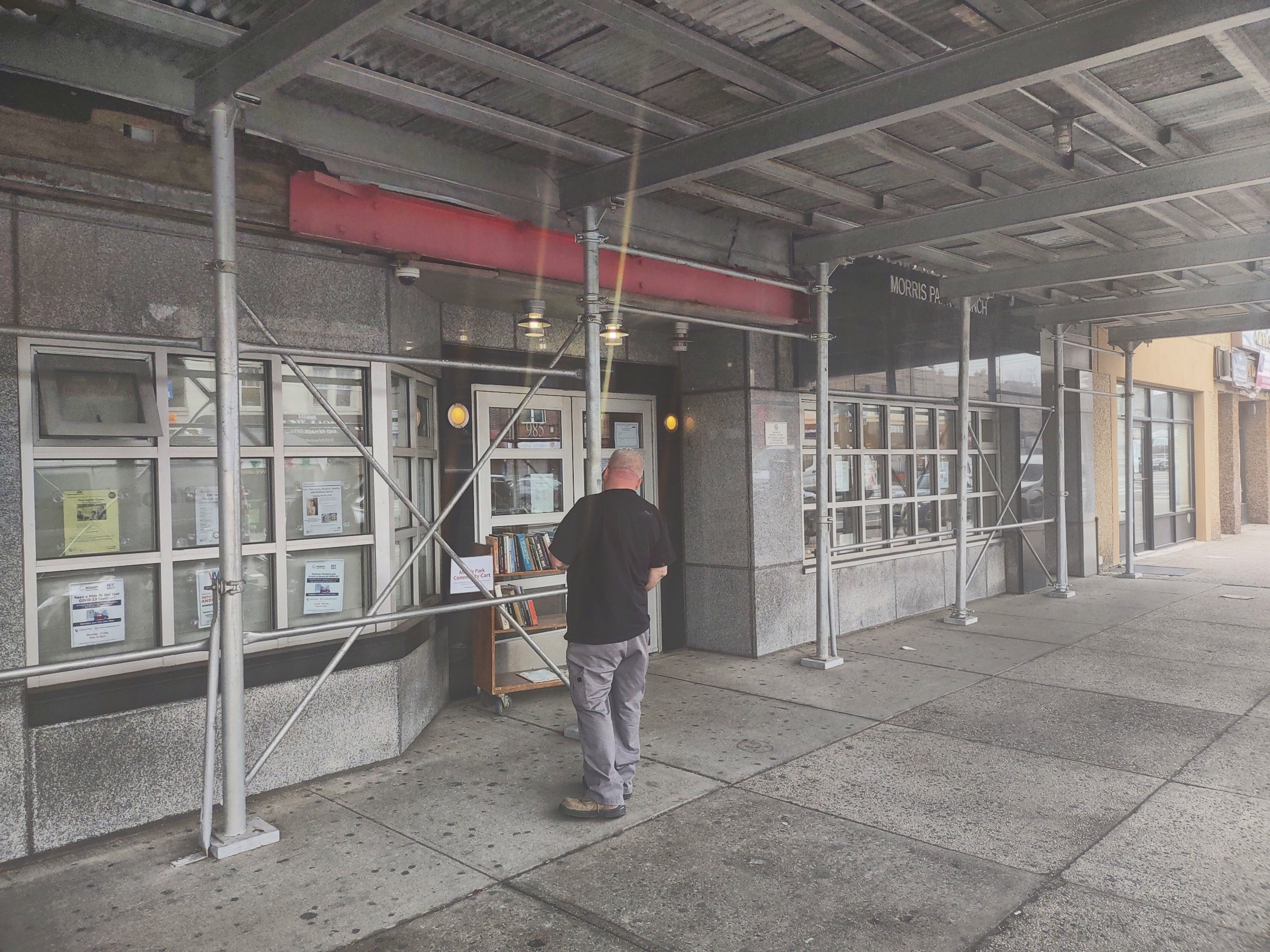
Morris Park Library

The New York Public Library's Morris Park branch is located at 985 Morris Park Avenue. The two-story, 6,600-square-foot (610 m^{2}) branch opened in 2006. It is the first branch library to be built in Morris Park, and one of the newest locations in the system.

== Transportation ==
The following MTA Regional Bus Operations bus routes serve Morris Park:

- Bx8 bus to either the 225th Street (2 and 5 trains) station or Locust Point
- Bx12 bus and Bx12 Select Bus Service to either the Bay Plaza Shopping Center or the Inwood–207th Street (A train) station
- Bx21 bus to either the Westchester Square (6 and <6> trains) or Third Avenue–138th Street (6 and <6> trains) stations
- Bx31 bus to either Woodlawn or the Westchester Square (6 and <6> trains) station
- BxM10 express bus to and from Midtown Manhattan

Morris Park is also served by the following Bee-Line Bus System routes to Westchester County, New York:

- BL60: to White Plains
- BL61: to Port Chester
- BL62: to White Plains

Subway service is provided by the New York City Subway via the following IRT Dyre Avenue Line stations, served by the 5 train:

- Pelham Parkway/Esplanade
- Morris Park

== Notable residents ==
- Cara Buono (born 1971), actress
- Mary Higgins Clark (1927–2020), best-selling mystery author
- Abel Ferrara (born 1951), film director
- Jeffrey D. Klein (born 1960), former New York State Senator (Democrat)
- Jake LaMotta (1922–2017), former professional boxer and middleweight champion
- James Madio (born 1975), actor
- Ronnie Ortiz-Magro (born 1985), cast member of Jersey Shore
- Luis Resto (born 1955), former welterweight boxer and subject of HBO documentary "Assault in the Ring"
- Anthony Ribustello (1966–2019), actor
- Nancy Savoca (born 1959), film director
- Andrew Velazquez (born 1994), MLB infielder. He played for the New York Yankees in 2021.
- Guy Velella (1944–2011), former New York State Senator and Bronx Republican Party Chairman

== In film ==
- The Seven-Ups (1973)
- The Wanderers (1979)
- Raging Bull (1980)
- True Love (1989)
- Bad Lieutenant (1991)
- Kiss Me Guido (1997)
- Summer of Sam (1999)
- Men in Black 3 (2012)
