= James Francis Collins =

US Army general; President, American Red Cross (1905–1989)

James F. Collins
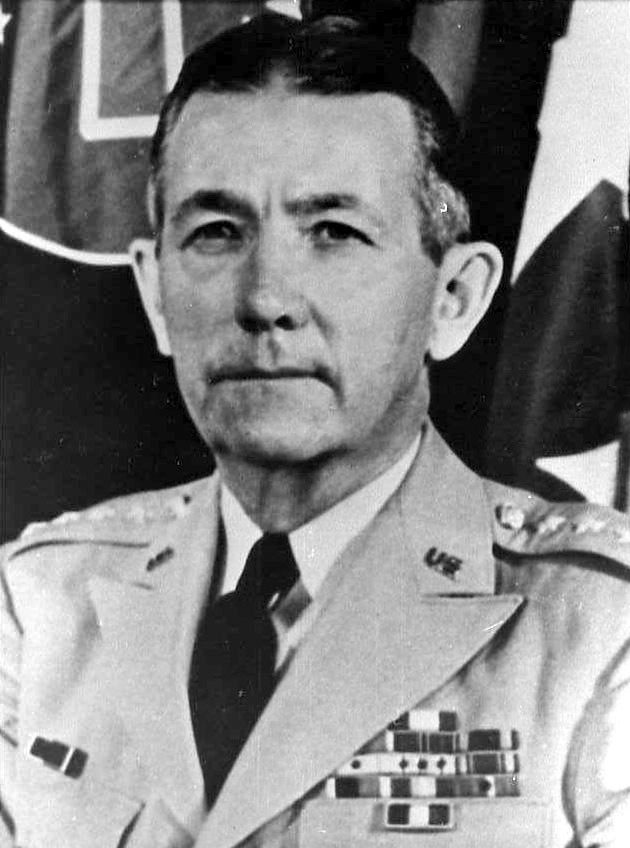
- General James F. Collins
- Born: 2 September 1905; Bronx, New York, US
- Died: 22 January 1989 (aged 83); Washington D.C., US
- Burial place: Arlington National Cemetery
- Military career
- Allegiance: United States of America
- Branch: United States Army
- Service years: 1927–1964
- Rank: General
- Commands: U.S. Army, Pacific; 2nd Infantry Division; 71st Infantry Division
- Conflicts: World War II
- Awards: Distinguished Service Medal (2); Legion of Merit; Bronze Star Medal
- Other work: President, American Red Cross

General James Francis Collins (2 September 1905 – 22 January 1989) commanded the U.S. Army, Pacific from April 1961 until his retirement in 1964, and was President of the American Red Cross from 1964 until 1970.

== Biography ==
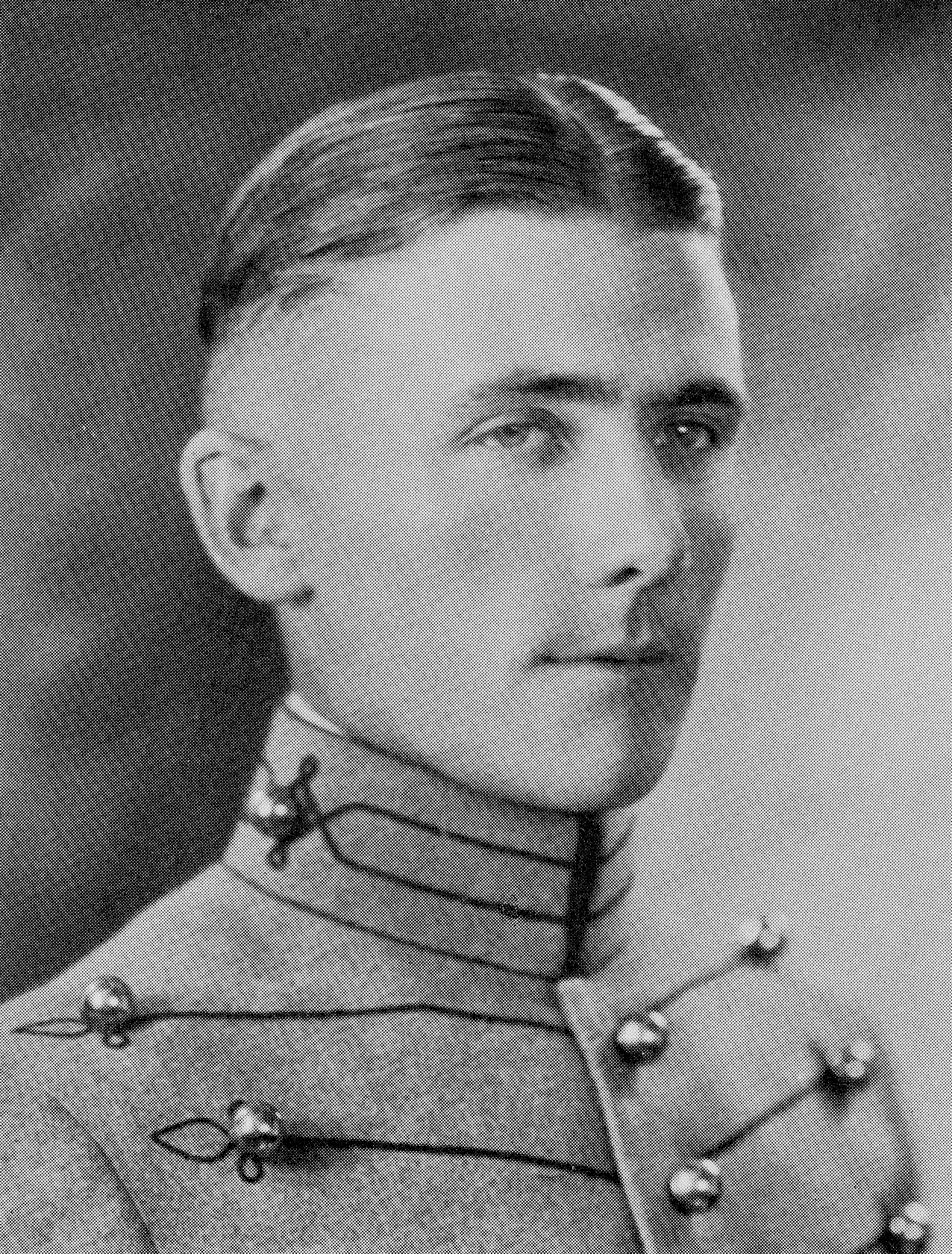
At West Point in 1927

James Francis Collins was born in The Bronx on 2 September 1905, and raised in the Van Nest neighborhood. A graduate of the United States Military Academy at West Point, he gained his commission in 1927 into the Field Artillery. He later attended the National War College. He also worked in the Hawaiian Division before the outbreak of World War II, during which he served exclusively in the Pacific Theater.

At the close of World War II, Collins commanded the I Corps Artillery in the Philippines and in Japan. From 1954 to 1957 he commanded the U.S. Army, Alaska. Afterward he commanded the 71st and 2nd Infantry Divisions before his tour in Hawaii. Other significant assignments include serving on the faculty of the Army War College and as Deputy Chief of Staff for Personnel, Department of the Army in Washington, D.C.

Collins was appointed President of the American Red Cross in 1964, one month after retiring from the Army. During his tenure he enhanced Red Cross services to American military personnel in Vietnam and to military hospitals worldwide.

He died from prostate cancer at Walter Reed Army Medical Center on 22 January 1989. He is buried with his wife Marian A. (1905–1986) at Arlington National Cemetery.

== Decorations ==
Army Distinguished Service Medal (with Oak Leaf Cluster)
Legion of Merit
Bronze Star
Air Medal
American Defense Service Medal (with Foreign Service Clasp)
Asiatic-Pacific Campaign Medal with three bronze campaign stars
World War II Victory Medal
Army of Occupation Medal with Japan clasp
National Defense Service Medal with Oak Leaf Cluster
Philippine Liberation Medal
Philippine Republic Presidential Unit Citation
Presidential Unit Citation
