= Penn Station Access =

Public works project in New York City

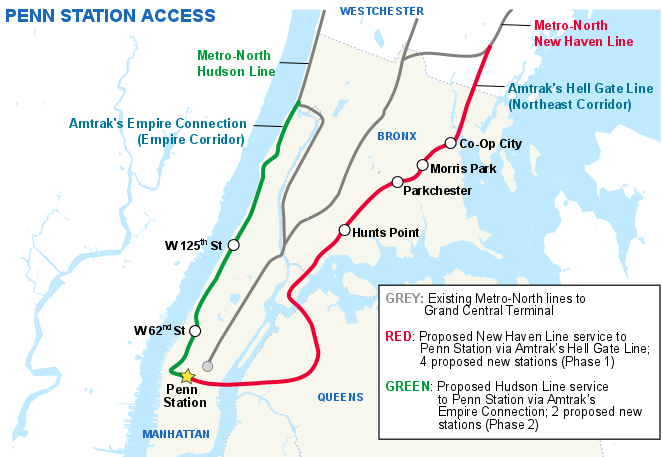
- Map of the two proposed routes and six proposed stations of the Penn Station Access project. The red line depicts planned New Haven Line service via Amtrak's Northeast Corridor (Hell Gate Line), and the green line indicates proposed Hudson Line service via Amtrak's Empire Connection.

Overview
- Status: Under construction
- Owner: Amtrak
- Locale: New York City
- Termini: New Rochelle station (New Rochelle, New York); New York Penn Station (Manhattan)
- Stations: 4 (Phase 1); 2 (Phase 2)
- Website: Official website

Service
- Type: Commuter rail
- System: Metro-North Railroad
- Services: New Haven Line (via Hell Gate Line); Hudson Line (via Empire Connection)
- Operator: MTA Metro-North Railroad

History
- Work began: December 2022
- Planned opening: 2030 (Phase 1)

Technical
- Character: At-grade, elevated, and underground
- Track gauge: 4 ft 8 1/2 in (1,435 mm) standard gauge
- Electrification: Third rail, 750 V DC; Overhead catenary

Penn Station Access (PSA) is a public works project underway by the Metropolitan Transportation Authority in New York City. The goal of the project is to allow Metro-North Railroad commuter trains to access Penn Station on Manhattan's West Side, using existing trackage owned by Amtrak. Metro-North trains currently terminate exclusively at Grand Central in Midtown Manhattan.

The project is scheduled to complement Grand Central Madison, which opened as part of East Side Access in 2023, and will commence in two separate phases. The first phase, which is under construction, will add four new stations along the Hell Gate Line (part of the Northeast Corridor) in the Bronx and route some New Haven Line trains to Penn Station. The second phase, which is unfunded, would add two more stations along the Empire Connection/West Side Line on Manhattan's West Side; this would be served by the Hudson Line. An agreement for the first phase was reached in early 2019, and a groundbreaking ceremony took place in December 2022. New Haven Line trains are tentatively expected to run into Penn Station in 2030. The opening of East Side Access will free up capacity for the expanded services to operate at Moynihan Train Hall, an expansion of Penn Station.

== Background ==
A 1969 proposal by the North Bronx Transportation Project considered running trains via the Hell Gate Bridge to Penn Station. Some plans for the Second Avenue Subway included integration with the upper portion of the line, providing express service from the East Side of Manhattan to Co-op City and Parkchester. This line was also considered for through-running with the Northeast Corridor in New Jersey, easing travel for residents of Westchester and Connecticut trying to get to New Jersey.

While not proposed officially, in June 1973, two Congressmen and the Mayor of Yonkers proposed having trains run from Stamford, Connecticut, to Penn Station, making stops at Pelham Manor, Co-op City, and Parkchester/Van Nest. They proposed that the line be operated by the MTA pending completion of the Second Avenue Subway, which was under construction at the time and slated to be completed in 1980. Sixty percent of Co-op City residents that responded to a survey said that they would have used the proposed rail service.

The Penn Station Access project was initiated on September 2, 1999, when the Federal Transit Administration (FTA), in conjunction with Metro-North Railroad, issued a Notice of Intent (NOI) to prepare a Major Investment Study/Environmental Impact Statement (EIS). The EIS was intended to consider possible additions to Metro-North using existing rail lines, with the intention of providing flexibility and increased regional access. Rail alternatives originally considered included Hudson and New Haven service, via the Empire Connection and Hell Gate Line, respectively, and a Harlem Line option via wyes at Mott Haven and Spuyten Duyvil.

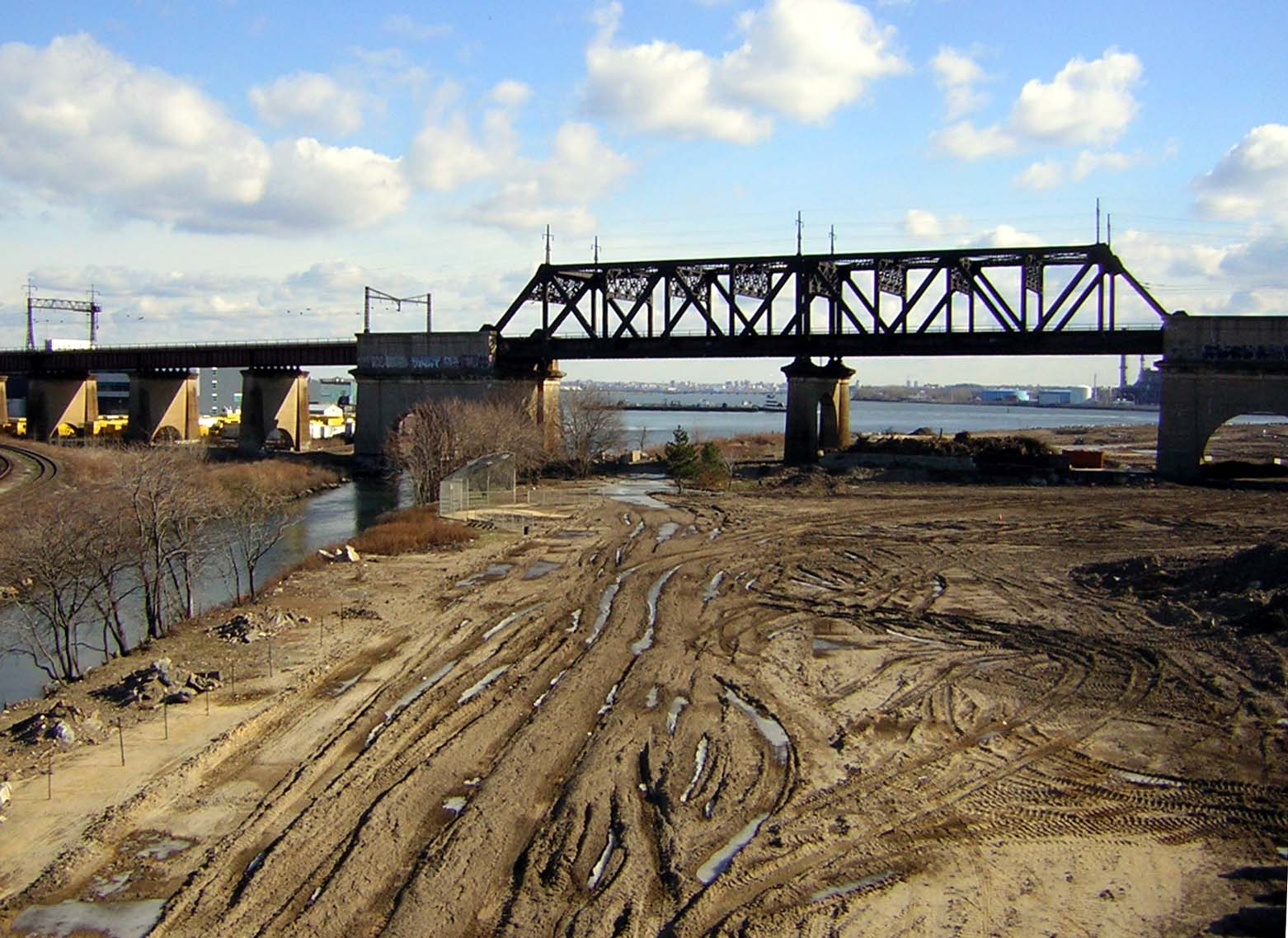
The Final Scoping Document for Penn Station Access called for the New Haven Line to use the Hell Gate Line (pictured) to access Penn Station

In November 2000, the Final Scoping Document for Penn Station Access was completed, showing 18 alternatives, including a no-build option, a Transportation Systems Management option, various commuter rail options, and alternatives using other modes. Various alternatives considered various ways to run service to Penn Station from the New Haven Line, the Hudson Line, and the Harlem Line, either during all times, or only operating during off-peak hours and weekends. Existing Metro-North riders would have the choice of arriving at either Penn Station or Grand Central on the New Haven Line and the Hudson Line. Service from the New Haven Line would diverge at New Rochelle, using Amtrak's Hell Gate Line to access Penn Station, while service from the Hudson Line would split off at Spuyten Duyvil station via Amtrak's Empire Connection. The alternatives via the Harlem Line would have required the construction of wye tracks. One option would have branched off of the Harlem Line at Mott Haven, using a wye track to go north via the Hudson Line. Using a newly constructed wye track at Spuyten Duyvil, service would turn south via the Empire Connection before reaching Penn Station. Another option considered would have constructed a wye track at Woodlawn, allowing Harlem trains to go east and head down the Hell Gate Line to Penn Station. The final option would have required the reconstruction of the Port Morris Branch and the Hell Gate Line. An additional option would have extended service from Grand Central to Penn Station through the construction of a new tunnel.

In September 2002, a second screening took place narrowing five alternatives to four, and narrowing 20 potential station locations in the Bronx, Queens and Manhattan to five locations. The remaining alternatives considered would have used either the Hudson or New Haven Lines. The Harlem Line options were removed from consideration. The five remaining stations under consideration were at West 125th Street and West 59th Street under the Hudson alternative, and at Co-Op City, Parkchester and Hunts Point under the New Haven alternative. The preferred alternatives would have used 3 miles (4.8 km) of trackage, and would have involved the construction of six new Metro-North stations in the Bronx and Manhattan, allowing riders in these areas to easily access Penn Station, Westchester, Dutchess, and Putnam counties upstate as well as Fairfield and New Haven counties in Connecticut. Existing Metro-North riders would have the choice of arriving at either Penn Station or Grand Central on the New Haven Line and the Hudson Line.

Afterwards, in coordination with the current rail operators at Penn Station (Amtrak, LIRR, and New Jersey Transit) it was determined that there were several operational limitations with the Hudson Line service alternative, mainly because the Empire Line's connection into Penn Station consists of only one track. The connection only leads to tracks 1–8 at Penn, which are used primarily by NJ Transit, with some usage by Amtrak. Since the implementation of Penn Station Access via the Hudson Line would have required substantial service reductions to those Penn Station tracks by NJ Transit and Amtrak or a new connection between the Empire Line and the LIRR tracks at Penn, progress did not continue on this alternative. Even though the Hell Gate Line alternative was chosen, this alternative is still being considered by Metro-North as capacity improvements at Penn Stations are underway, such as the Gateway tunnels. Penn Station Access would also provide system resiliency to protect service in the event of natural or other disasters.

By 2011, Metro-North had initiated a federal environmental study for Penn Station Access, to be completed by 2013. The cost of the project was estimated at $350 million with the state of Connecticut funding $100 million and the state of New York funding the remaining $250 million.

== Phase One ==
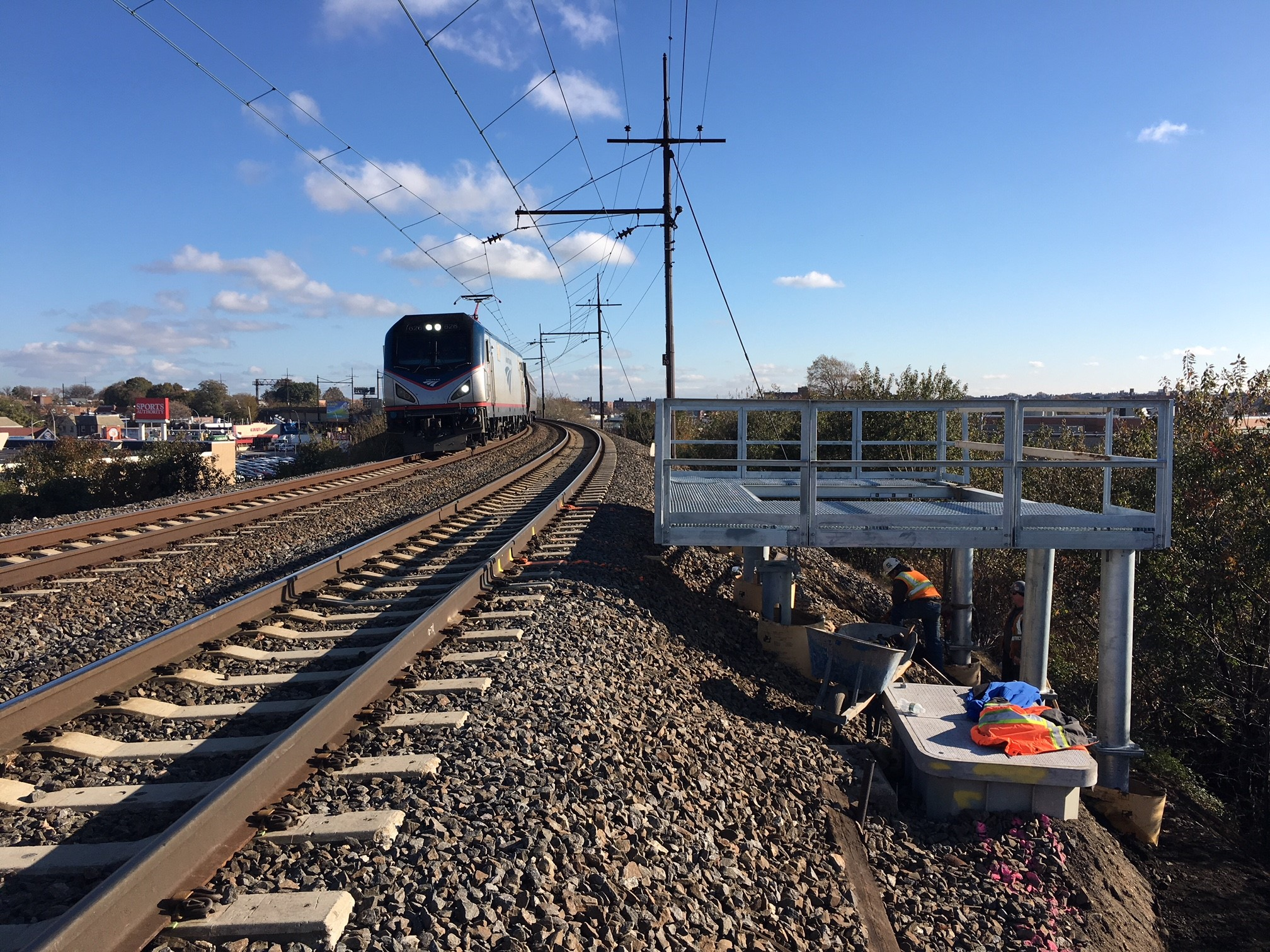
The New Haven Line would use the Hell Gate Line into Queens before entering Penn Station.

The first piece of Penn Station Access would route some New Haven Line trains down Amtrak's Northeast Corridor to Penn Station. The New Haven Line to Grand Central splits off from the Northeast Corridor near New Rochelle. The Northeast Corridor (also known here as the Hell Gate Line) continues south crossing the Pelham Bay Bridge into the Bronx, the Hell Gate Bridge into Queens, and entering Manhattan through the East River Tunnels also used by the Long Island Rail Road. This phase includes the construction of four new Metro-North stations in the Bronx to be served by the New Haven Line, located in Co-op City, Morris Park, Parkchester/Van Nest, and Hunts Point. The stations would provide fast, direct rides to West Midtown and facilitate reverse-commuting trips to Westchester County and Connecticut. The new stations would provide transit access to the transit-deficient East Bronx.

Previously, a station was also considered to be built in Astoria, Queens; however, analysis showed that there would not be enough riders to justify the high cost of constructing a station. The construction of a station was projected to cost over $20 million, and the station would only be able to be four cars long. The station would only have a projected annual ridership of 310,367. Since 2014, local residents have pushed to have a Metro-North station built in Queens, either between 41st and 44th Streets in Astoria, or at Northern Boulevard and Broadway in Woodside.

=== Planning ===
==== Original announcement ====
On January 8, 2014, then-New York Governor Andrew Cuomo voiced support for the project in his 2014 State of the State address. With his support for the project, $695 million was budgeted for the project in the MTA's 2015–2019 Capital Program. In order to accommodate more trains, power and signal systems, and yards at Penn Station and New Rochelle will be upgraded and three railroad bridges will be rehabilitated or replaced. In addition, a third track will be installed between the Parkchester/Van Nest station and north of the Co-Op City station, and additional switches will be added. Metro-North service to Penn Station will begin after the completion of the East Side Access project, which has diverted some Long island Rail Road trains to Grand Central, therefore opening up slots at Penn Station for Metro-North service. During peak hours there will be between six and ten trains to Penn Station. There will be four trains per hour to Connecticut in the reverse peak direction, and there will be two trains per hour to and from Penn Station during off-peak and weekends.

The project would add redundancy to the regional transportation network in case of service interruption. Regional connectivity will be increased with accessible transfers to Amtrak, the Long Island Rail Road and New Jersey Transit at Penn Station. Through-running between the New Haven Line and NJ Transit would be possible, linking business centers in Connecticut and New Jersey while providing access to Newark Liberty Airport. The draft Environmental Assessment was to be made available for public review in late 2018. In September 2017, the proposed alignment for the project only had three tracks through Hunts Point.

==== Design process ====
At the MTA's Metro-North Railroad Committee meeting on January 22, 2019, it was announced that Amtrak and the MTA had reached an agreement regarding track usage rights, and $35 million was approved for initial engineering design work. In addition, HNTB New York Engineering and Architecture received a $35 million contract to consult on the planning of the four new stations. In exchange for being allowed to use the Hell Gate Line and build the four stations, the MTA agreed to replace the Pelham Bay Bridge across the Hutchinson River, as well as pay access fees for using the Hell Gate Bridge. Amtrak and the MTA also agreed to conduct a joint study on the feasibility of extending Amtrak service to Long Island via the tracks used by the LIRR. As part of the project, three track interlockings would be built, one existing interlocking would be rehabilitated, and the line would be widened from three to four tracks between the Hell Gate and Pelham Bay Bridges. The expanded services will operate at Moynihan Train Hall, an expansion of Penn Station into the neighboring James A. Farley Building.

Design for the project began in February 2019, and construction was expected to begin in late 2020, with an expected opening by 2023. By February 2020, the MTA had identified three firms that were qualified to bid on the design–build contracts for Penn Station Access. At that point, the project's opening date was announced as 2024. Shortly afterward, work was placed on hold due to the COVID-19 pandemic in the United States. The FTA published a draft EIS in May 2021, and the state government commenced a request for proposals for the project's development. The project's completion was then announced for 2025. On September 28, 2021, the FTA issued a Finding of No Significant Impact (FONSI) for the project, allowing the project to move forward. The FRA issued a FONSI for the project on November 16, 2021. In December 2021, it was announced that completion of the line would be delayed until 2027.

==== Funding ====
On December 13, 2021, it was announced that Senate Majority Leader Chuck Schumer had helped broker a deal with the MTA and Amtrak to fund $500 million for the PSA project and $432 million for the rehabilitation of the East River Tunnels using money available due to the passage of the Infrastructure Investment and Jobs Act. On December 15, the MTA Board approved the award of a 63-month design-build contract for the project to a joint venture of Halmar International and RailWork Transit for $1,850,643,000, of which $133,580,000 was for an option to complete improvements in New Rochelle Yard. The MTA Board also approved a cost sharing agreement with Amtrak that set the conditions for the completion of the project on Amtrak's right-of-way. Amtrak agreed to fund $500 million of the project costs as it derived some benefits from the project.

On the same date, the MTA Board approved the awarding of an 86-month contract to WSP USA and Atlas ATC Engineering for project management. The contract was awarded for $116,572,815, with an option for $17,035,237. Furthermore, the MTA Board approved an amendment to the 2020–2024 Capital Program to increase the entire cost of the project to $2.867 billion, and defer $460 million of the project costs, including the option for improvements in New Rochelle Yard and some contingencies and support costs, to a future date. The amendment would increase funding in the 2020–2024 program from $1.131 billion to $2.052 billion, or $920.8 million; $452 million for the project was in the 2015–2019 program. The entire budget for the project went up from $1.561 billion to $2.482 billion. The cost increase was due to bids that were received, increases in the price of construction materials and labor, additional scope required by Amtrak, including expanded power and communication upgrades and a fourth track, and limitations on labor support committed by Amtrak and track outages. Funding for the budget increase would be made using the $500 million in Amtrak funding, and the reallocation of funding from other projects in the Capital Program.

=== Beginning of construction ===
A groundbreaking ceremony for Penn Station Access took place in the Bronx on December 9, 2022, marking the official start of construction. Although the project was initially supposed to be completed by March 2027, MTA officials indicated in January 2023 that the first phase of Penn Station Access could be postponed by six to nine months. According to MTA Construction and Development president Jamie Torres-Springer, the Hell Gate Line had to be partially closed to allow work on Penn Station Access to proceed, but Amtrak had refused to approve a plan that would have closed the line at night and during the weekend. Torres-Springer said the MTA had proposed closing the line for up to eight months beginning in March 2023 but that Amtrak had not yet approved the proposal. Without a temporary closure of the Hell Gate Line, the project would not be complete until at least October 2027. The federal government provided $1.6 billion for the project in late 2023.

In August 2024, the New York City Council voted to rezone 46 city blocks in Parkchester, Van Nest, and Morris Park, around the Metro-North Railroad's Parkchester/Van Nest and Morris Park stations, as part of the Penn Station Access project. The city government also promised to spend $500 million on infrastructure upgrades around these stations. The rezoning was intended to encourage development around these stations. As a result, up to 7,000 housing units could be constructed in the three neighborhoods.

On January 24, 2025, Metro-North solicited a sole source procurement for up to 16 Siemens Charger locomotives from Siemens to operate service on Penn Station Access. The order would be done as an option order to an existing order. In February 2025, the MTA Board was to vote on an option order for 13 dual-mode Charger locomotives, with an option for two additional locomotives for $304.9 million. These locomotives will be powered using both AC Pantographs to operate under catenary and battery power, which is a modification to Siemens' existing design for Tier 4 diesel-electric dual mode locomotives. If the option is approved, the cars would be delivered between January 2029 and July 2030. It will also vote on a proposal to use a request for proposals (RFP) instead of competitive bidding to procure coach cars to be used for PSA to ensure full fleet availability and to replace Metro-North's Center-Door and End-Door coach cars.

In October 2025, MTA officials stated that the completion of Penn Station Access could be postponed to 2030 because Amtrak officials had refused to give MTA workers access to the Hell Gate Line during most weekends. At the time, the MTA said that three of the four stations could still open as early as 2027 if Amtrak agreed to expedite the work, but that the Hunts Point station would still be delayed. If Amtrak agreed to expedite the work, temporary platforms could be installed at the three stations until the project was completed. In response, Amtrak officials promised to study the feasibility of allowing a small number of Metro-North trains to use the Penn Station Access routing from 2027 onward.

=== Existing service ===
New Haven Line service to Penn Station already existed in a very limited fashion, the Train to the Game, which ran between New Haven and NJ Transit's Secaucus Junction. Connecting service to Meadowlands station brought riders to Sunday 1 PM NFL games played by the New York Jets and New York Giants. This special service, operated using NJ Transit equipment, stopped at Penn Station, but that was only a secondary benefit of the operation.

== Phase Two ==
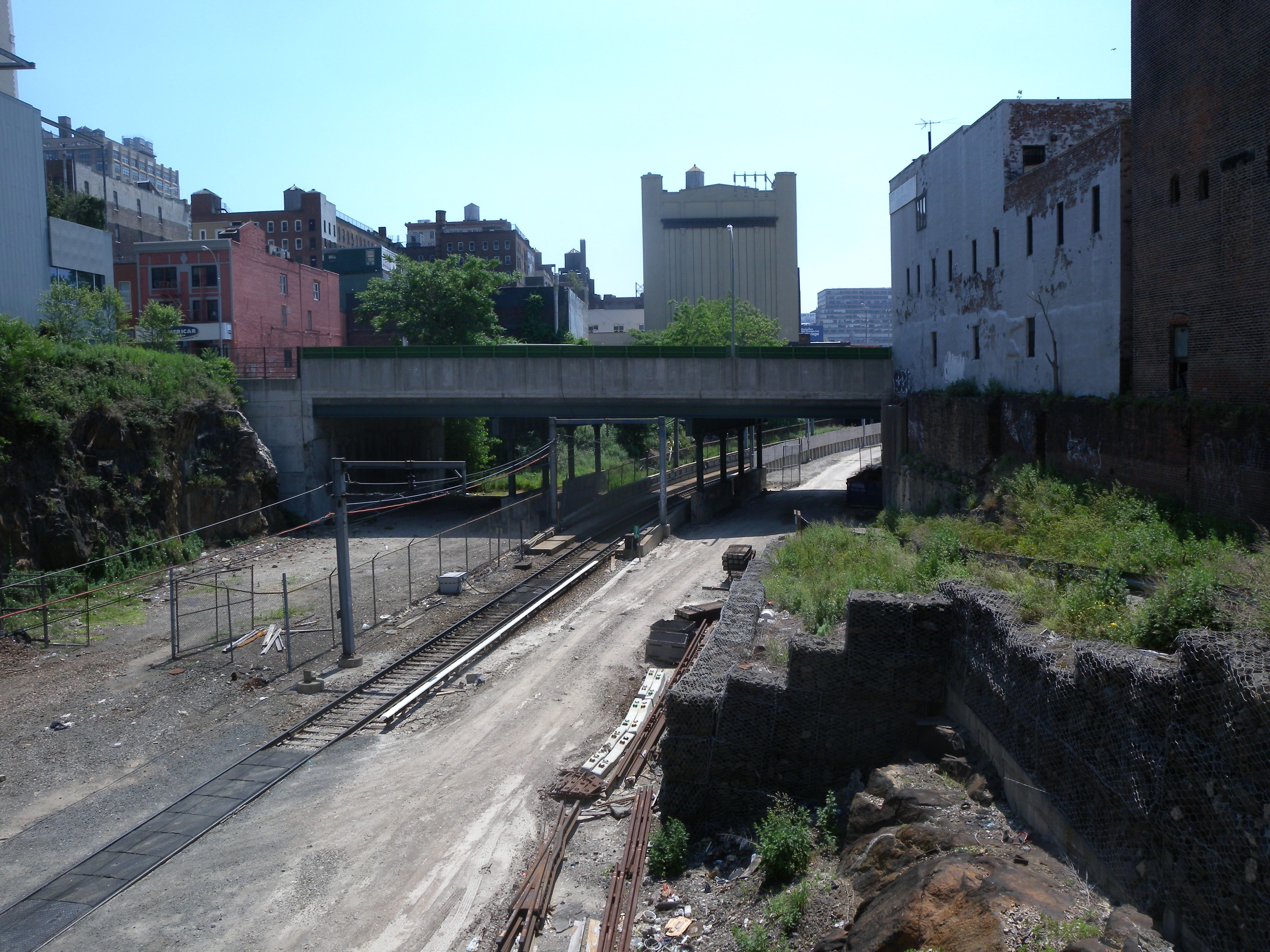
Hudson Line trains would use the Empire Connection in Manhattan to access Penn Station

The second part of the project, currently unfunded, would bring Hudson Line trains into Penn Station using Amtrak's Empire Connection, which runs on Manhattan's West Side via the West Side Line. The Empire Connection branches off from the Hudson Line near Spuyten Duyvil station, just north of the eponymous bridge across Spuyten Duyvil Creek, and is currently used by Amtrak's Empire Corridor trains traveling from Upstate New York, Canada, and other destinations. The majority of the Empire Connection is not electrified, so the M3A and M7A electric railcars in use on the Hudson Line would be unable to travel to Penn Station unless the line is electrified. The former New York Central Railroad lines, including the Hudson Line, use under-running third rail. Tracks in Penn Station and on the LIRR use over-running third rail. Any Metro-North cars traveling from the Hudson Line to Penn Station would have to be specially equipped to operate with both current collection systems. This phase includes a proposal for two new Metro-North stations to be served by the Hudson Line. Both stations would be located in Manhattan along the Empire Connection: one at West 125th Street in Manhattanville and the other near 62nd Street on the Upper West Side.

== Project details ==
Penn Station Access will add new tracks along the Hell Gate Line right-of-way, relocate, reconfigure, and add new interlockings, realign and install new catenaries, construct four new stations, replace and repair undergrade bridges, upgrade existing AC substations, and construct new AC substations.

The project originally called for the installation of 3 miles (4.8 km) of third rail and two new DC substations at Gate and Woodside to accommodate Metro-North's M8 electric multiple units, which cannot operate under Amtrak's 25 Hz traction power system between Gate Interlocking and Harold Interlocking. However, the third-rail installation was removed from the project's scope. In September 2026, the MTA confirmed that, for this reason, the M8s would no longer be used as the primary option for Penn Station Access service. Metro-North instead intends to use its Siemens Charger SC42-DM dual-mode and Charger B+AC battery and alternating-current locomotives, requiring modifications to their positive train control systems to operate along the Penn Station Access route.

The MTA had considered relocating the existing AC phase break from Gate to Harold. The project would also upgrade New Rochelle Yard and replace the existing wayside signaling with a higher-density signaling system to accommodate the increased level of service on the line. C Yard in Penn Station will be modified minimally with the reenergizing of the third rail on Track 3 in the yard, which had been used to store Long Island Rail Road maintenance-of-way trucks. These changes would allow three train sets to be stored in the yard.

The MTA had the design consultant study the feasibility of building a tunnel connecting the Hunts Point station on PSA with the Hunts Point Avenue station on the IRT Pelham Line. It also had them study whether it made sense to reuse the historic Westchester Avenue station headhouse for the Hunts Point station.

== Possible Harlem Line service ==
It has been proposed to have Harlem Line access to Penn Station as well by reactivating the abandoned Port Morris Branch in the South Bronx. The reactivated railroad branch would connect the Harlem Line to the Hell Gate Line. However, these plans have been complicated due to the private ownership of the land next to the right-of-way, as well as a new housing development directly on the right-of-way at 156th Street.
