= Van Nest, Bronx =

Neighborhood in New York City

Van Nest
- Neighborhood of the Bronx
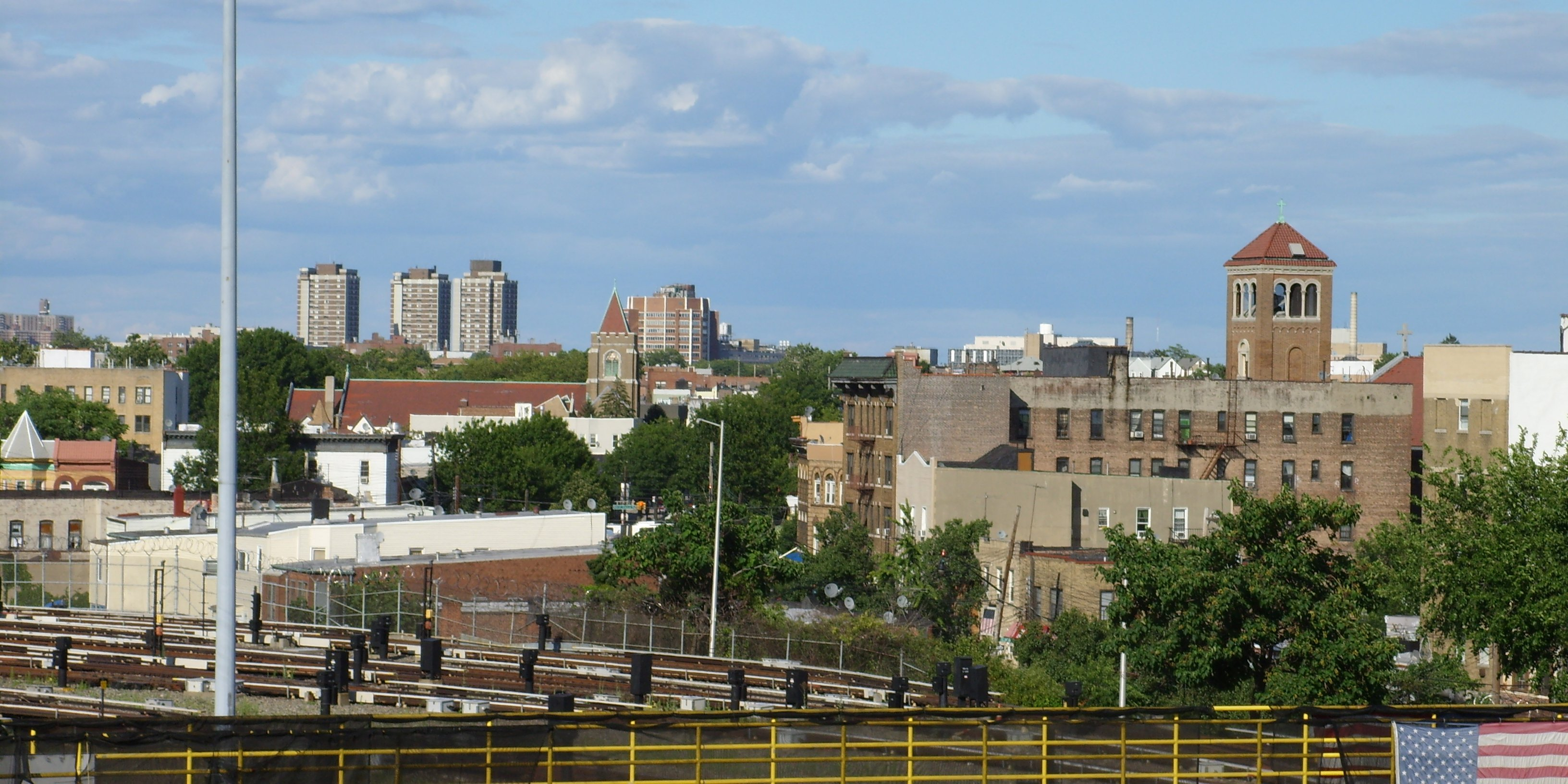
- Overlooking Van Nest towards the northeast
- Location in New York City
- Coordinates: 40.848°N 73.864°W
- Country: United States
- State: New York
- City: New York City
- Borough: The Bronx
- Community District: Bronx 11
- Named for: Reynier Van Nest

Area
  - Total: 0.424 sq mi (1.10 km^{2})

Population (2011)
  - Total: 13,909 (estimated)
  - Density: 32,800/sq mi (12,700/km^{2})

Economics
  - Median income: $47,952
- ZIP Codes: 10460, 10462
- Area code: 718, 347, 929, and 917
- Website: www.vannest.nyc

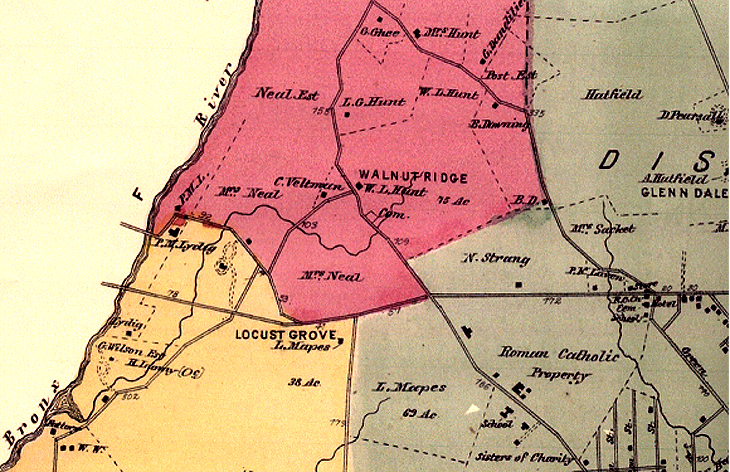
Area now known as Van Nest in 1868

Van Nest is a working-class neighborhood geographically located in the East Bronx section of the Bronx, New York City. Going clockwise, its boundaries are Bronxdale Avenue to the northeast, the Amtrak tracks to the southeast, and Bronx Park to the west. Van Nest predated Morris Park by 20 years and is considered the older of the two communities. Morris Park Avenue and White Plains Road are the primary commercial thoroughfares through Van Nest.

The neighborhood is part of Bronx Community Board 11, and its ZIP Codes include 10460 and 10462. The area is patrolled by the 49th Precinct of the New York City Police Department.

== History ==
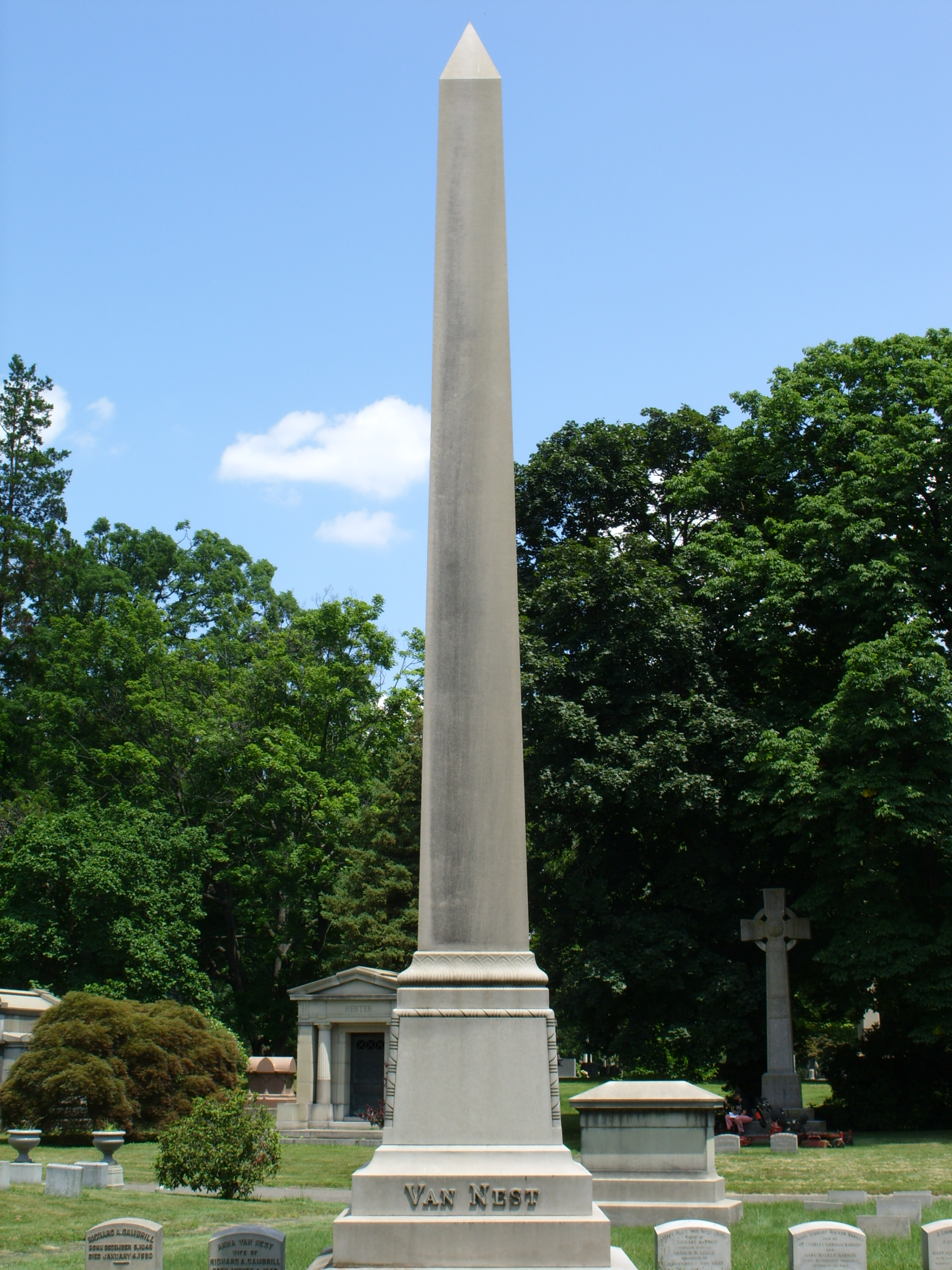
Van Nest family plot in Woodlawn Cemetery

The neighborhood got its name from the former Van Nest station on the New York, New Haven and Hartford Railroad, which was named after the father of Abraham R. Van Nest, a director of the railroad. A short railroad spur was constructed off the main line from the Van Nest station to serve the adjacent Morris Park Racecourse, which was the site of thoroughbred horse racing from 1889 to 1904. Between 1892 and 1896, lots were subdivided from farmland by the Van Nest Land & Improvement Company. Before the city graded the streets in 1895, the flat terrain and accumulation of rainwater in low-lying areas resulted in this area being nicknamed "Mud West". The multi-legged intersection of Van Nest Avenue, Unionport Road, and Victor Street is still known as the "Five Corners" by many old timers and locals.

In August 2024, the New York City Council voted to rezone 46 city blocks in Van Nest, Parkchester, and Morris Park, around the Metro-North Railroad's Parkchester/Van Nest and Morris Park stations, as part of the Penn Station Access project. The city government also promised to spend $500 million on infrastructure upgrades around these stations. The rezoning was intended to encourage development around these stations. As a result, up to 7,000 housing units could be constructed in the three neighborhoods.

== Demographics ==
Van Nest has a population under 15,000. The neighborhood has a concentration of Puerto Ricans and also contains a significant African American population. A small longstanding Italian and Albanian population exist east of White Plains Road near Morris Park. The majority of residents rent. Almost 20% of the population lives below the poverty line.

For census purposes, the New York City government classifies Van Nest as part of a larger neighborhood tabulation area called Van Nest/Morris Park/Westchester Square. Based on data from the 2010 United States census, the population of Van Nest/Morris Park/Westchester Square was 29,250, a change of 2,115 (7.2%) from the 27,135 counted in 2000. Covering an area of 829.61 acres (335.73 ha), the neighborhood had a population density of 35.3 inhabitants per acre (22,600/sq mi; 8,700/km^{2}). The racial makeup of the neighborhood was 27.3% (7,987) White, 11.1% (3,245) African American, 0.3% (82) Native American, 10.6% (3,100) Asian, 0.1% (15) Pacific Islander, 1% (292) from other races, and 1.4% (410) from two or more races. Hispanic or Latino of any race were 48.3% (14,119) of the population.

The entirety of Community District 11, which comprises Van Nest, Morris Park, and Allerton, had 116,180 inhabitants as of NYC Health's 2018 Community Health Profile, with an average life expectancy of 79.9 years. This is lower than the median life expectancy of 81.2 for all New York City neighborhoods. Most inhabitants are youth and middle-aged adults: 22% are between the ages of between 0–17, 30% between 25 and 44, and 24% between 45 and 64. The ratio of college-aged and elderly residents was lower, at 9% and 14% respectively.

As of 2017, the median household income in Community District 11 was $48,018. In 2018, an estimated 21% of Van Nest and Allerton residents lived in poverty, compared to 25% in all of the Bronx and 20% in all of New York City. One in eight residents (12%) were unemployed, compared to 13% in the Bronx and 9% in New York City. Rent burden, or the percentage of residents who have difficulty paying their rent, is 55% in Van Nest and Allerton, compared to the boroughwide and citywide rates of 58% and 51% respectively. Based on this calculation, as of 2018, Van Nest and Allerton are considered high-income relative to the rest of the city and not gentrifying.

== Politics ==
Politically, Van Nest is in New York's 14th congressional district, represented by Democrat Alexandria Ocasio-Cortez as of 2019. It is also part of the 33rd and 34th State Senate districts, represented respectively by Democrats Gustavo Rivera and Alessandra Biaggi, and the 80th and 87th State Assembly districts, represented respectively by Democrats Nathalia Fernandez and Karines Reyes. Van Nest is located in New York's 13th and 15th City Council districts, represented respectively by Democrats Mark Gjonaj and Ritchie Torres.

== Land use and architecture ==
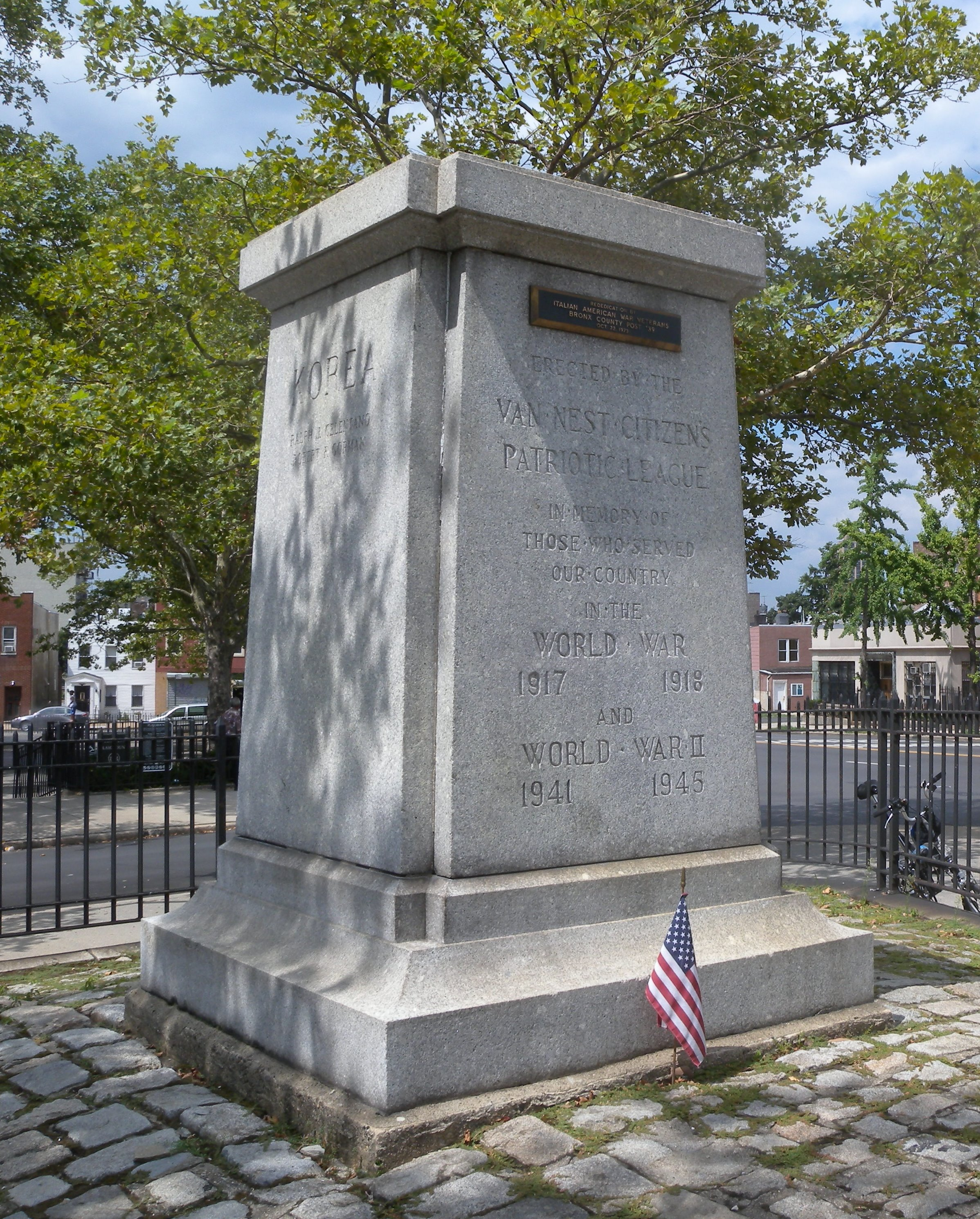
Memorial Square

Van Nest is dominated by single family homes of various types. There are also some tenements scattered across the neighborhood. The total land area is roughly one square mile. Architectural styles are diverse in Van Nest, which was started as a residential community in 1893. Italianate, Queen Anne, Art Deco and contemporary brick and mortar are all found. Con Edison's Van Nest Service Center is located north of the Amtrak Northeast Corridor line between Unionport Road and Bronxdale Avenue, occupying the former maintenance shops of the New York, New Haven and Hartford Railroad. The Con Edison Service Center was purchased in September 1959 from the New York, New Haven and Hartford Railroad for $3 million. The former Van Nest Yards were built in 1907 and the Yards, now Con Edison Service Center consists of 940,000 square feet (87,000 m^{2}).

=== Park ===
Van Nest Park is bound by White Plains Road to the east, Unionport Road to the west, and Van Nest Avenue to the north. Mead Street bisects Van Nest Park from Van Nest Memorial Square, which houses the war memorial. Van Nest Park was acquired by New York City in August 1913, the present location of Van Nest Memorial Square. In April 1922, the land was placed under Parks' jurisdiction. The monument, which stands at the center of the original park, was erected in April 1926 by the Van Nest Citizens' Patriotic League, who were, at one time, located at 1800 Hunt Avenue. The monument is made of Deere Isle granite and was designed by architect Arthur G. Waldreaon. The park, like the neighborhood, was named after Reynier Van Nest, a saddle maker.

Three of the four granite panels have the names of fallen soldiers from World War I, Korea, and Vietnam. The main facing panel has a tribute to fallen soldiers from World War II. By 1938, the park expanded to include not only a monument but playground equipment. The monument was rededicated by the Italian-American War Veterans' Bronx County Post #39 in October 1973. Memorial and Veterans' Day services have been reinstituted in previous years to pay respect to the deceased, as well as current and former servicemen and women. The monument area is slated to be redesigned and upgraded starting in Spring 2018. Additionally, a flagpole will be added to complete renovation.

In 1997, Mayor Rudy Giuliani funded a $30,000 renovation of the park replacing the old playground equipment. Dialogue concerning the renovation of the park was started in 2010. However, as of May 2011, $950,000 had been allocated for renovations to the playground. Construction of the park was started in March 2014 and lasted for a year. The renovated park's railroad theme is based on the neighborhood's long-standing ties to the Van Nest station along the Northeast Corridor. Additionally, security cameras were installed through a contribution from Cross-County Federal Bank to monitor night time activity in the park. State Senator Jeffrey D. Klein was instrumental in securing the proper permits for the cameras. Van Nest Park, after being completely renovated, was officially opened to the public in May 2015.

== Police and crime ==
Van Nest and Allerton are patrolled by the 49th Precinct of the NYPD, located at 2121 Eastchester Road. The 49th Precinct ranked 43rd safest out of 69 patrol areas for per-capita crime in 2010. As of 2018, with a non-fatal assault rate of 64 per 100,000 people, Van Nest and Allerton's rate of violent crimes per capita is slightly more than that of the city as a whole. The incarceration rate of 372 per 100,000 people is lower than that of the city as a whole.

The 49th Precinct has a lower crime rate than in the 1990s, with crimes across all categories having decreased by 71.7% between 1990 and 2022. The precinct reported 7 murders, 17 rapes, 273 robberies, 367 felony assaults, 133 burglaries, 611 grand larcenies, and 371 grand larcenies auto in 2022.

=== Social issues ===
Van Nest contains one of the highest concentrations of poverty in Bronx Community District 11. It is believed many of the newest residents are from higher poverty sections of the Bronx such as neighboring West Farms and Parkchester. With this relocation some of the social problems commonly associated with those communities have come to Van Nest. Drug trafficking, teen pregnancy, domestic violence and violent crimes, including gang activity, are common. Van Nest, being roughly one square mile, is one neighborhood within the larger 49th Precinct.

In January 2010, a community organization known as the Van Nest Neighborhood Alliance (VNNA) was created, which meets monthly. Their agenda is to work jointly with the 49th Precinct to ensure that any reported crimes are handled quickly and follow-up conducted thoroughly. Additionally, aside from merely reporting and following up with crimes, both the 49th Precinct and the VNNA are trying to direct the youth into precinct sponsored programs such as kids and cops basketball and Explorers. The rise in youth-related crimes is a genuine concern for the VNNA and the local 49th police precinct.

== Fire safety ==
Van Nest is served by the New York City Fire Department (FDNY)'s Engine Co. 90/Ladder Co. 41 fire station at 1843 White Plains Road. Ladder Co. 41, also known as the Van Nest Hose Company originally started out as volunteer company and was known as Van Nest Hose Co. No. 1. They were originally located at 1703 Unionport Road and were organized in 1906. Additionally, Van Nest Hose Co. No. 2 was located at East Tremont and Rosedale Avenues and disbanded in 1910, the same year as Hose Co. No. 1. When the Van Nest Hose Co. 1 made the move to White Plains Road in May 1910 they became a paid company.

In May 2010, Engine Co. 90/Ladder Co. 41 celebrated its 100th anniversary. The area around White Plains Road where the firehouse is located was blocked off for the celebration. In attendance were 147 alumni from the firehouse, FDNY Fire Commissioner Salvatore Cassano and an additional 153 guests. The final part of the ceremony was the unveiling of a plaque to commemorate the 100 years of dedicated service in addition to an existing plaque that was originally placed inside the firehouse in 1910 when it opened. A few members of Engine Co. 90 have also served in the U.S. military, and one had died after suffering from PTSD related to 9/11.

== Health ==
As of 2018, preterm births and births to teenage mothers are slightly more common in Van Nest and Allerton than in other places citywide. In Van Nest and Allerton, there were 90 preterm births per 1,000 live births (compared to 87 per 1,000 citywide), and 19.7 births to teenage mothers per 1,000 live births (compared to 19.3 per 1,000 citywide). Van Nest and Allerton has a low population of residents who are uninsured. In 2018, this population of uninsured residents was estimated to be 12%, the same as the citywide rate of 12%.

The concentration of fine particulate matter, the deadliest type of air pollutant, in Van Nest and Allerton is 0.0074 milligrams per cubic metre (7.4×10^{−9} oz/ft^{3}), less than the city average. Fifteen percent of Van Nest and Allerton residents are smokers, which is slightly higher than the city average of 14% of residents being smokers. In Van Nest and Allerton, 32% of residents are obese, 14% are diabetic, and 31% have high blood pressure—compared to the citywide averages of 24%, 11%, and 28% respectively. In addition, 23% of children are obese, compared to the citywide average of 20%.

Eighty-three percent of residents eat some fruits and vegetables every day, which is lower than the city's average of 87%. In 2018, 80% of residents described their health as "good", "very good", or "excellent", slightly higher than the city's average of 78%. For every supermarket in Van Nest and Allerton, there are 17 bodegas.

The nearest large hospitals are Calvary Hospital, Montefiore Medical Center's Jack D. Weiler Hospital, and NYC Health + Hospitals/Jacobi in Morris Park. The Albert Einstein College of Medicine campus is also located in Morris Park.

== Post office and ZIP Codes ==
Van Nest is located within ZIP Codes 10460 west of Unionport Road and 10462 east of Unionport Road. The United States Postal Service operates the Parkway Station post office at 2100 White Plains Road.

== Education ==
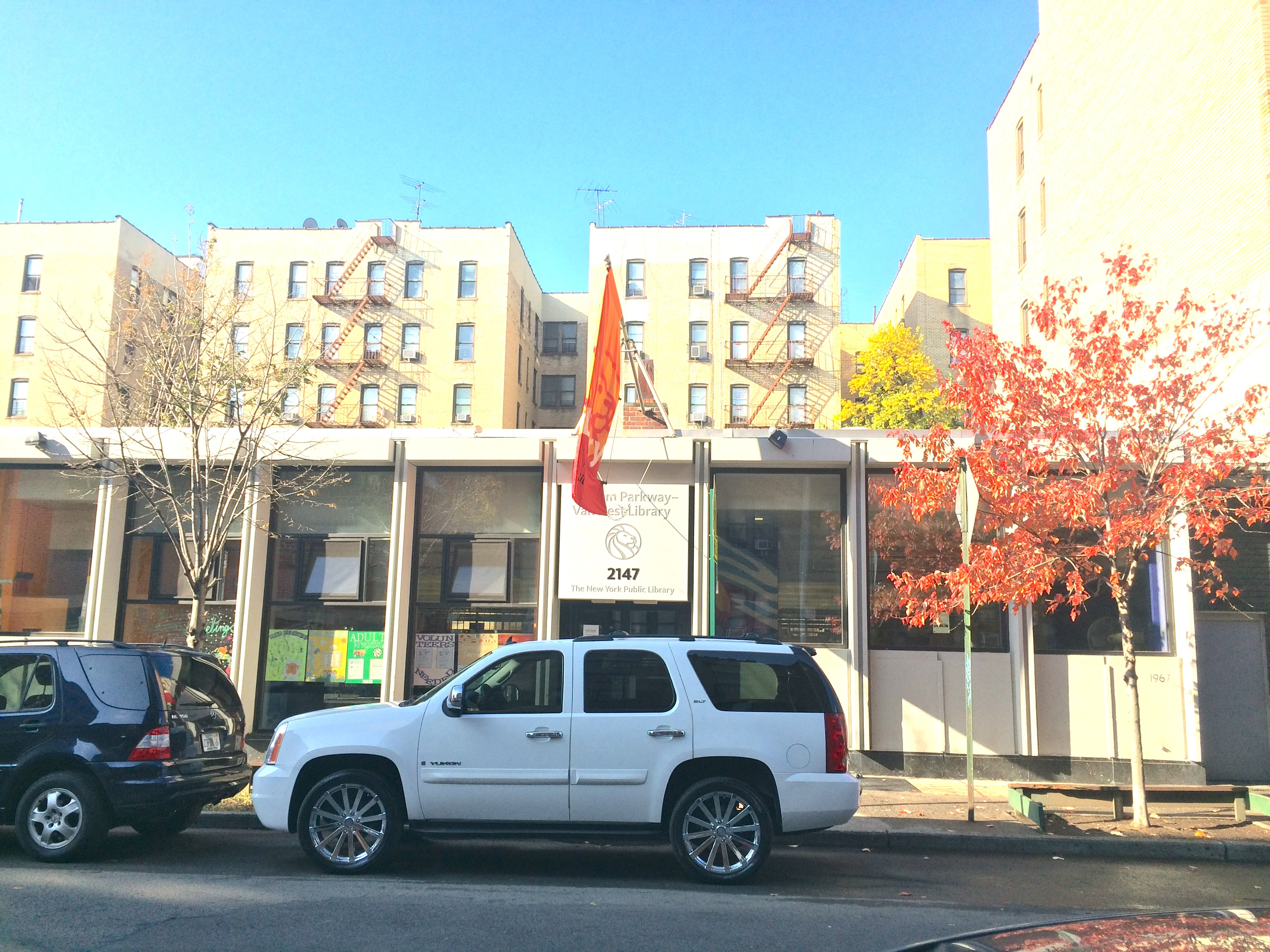
New York Public Library, Pelham Parkway Van Nest branch

Van Nest and Allerton generally have a lower rate of college-educated residents than the rest of the city as of 2018. While 32% of residents age 25 and older have a college education or higher, 24% have less than a high school education and 44% are high school graduates or have some college education. By contrast, 26% of Bronx residents and 43% of city residents have a college education or higher. The percentage of Van Nest and Allerton students excelling in math rose from 32% in 2000 to 48% in 2011, though reading achievement remained constant at 37% during the same time period.

Van Nest and Allerton's rate of elementary school student absenteeism is slightly higher than the rest of New York City. In Van Nest and Allerton, 23% of elementary school students missed twenty or more days per school year, a little more than the citywide average of 20%. Additionally, 74% of high school students in Van Nest and Allerton graduate on time, about the same as the citywide average of 75%.

=== Schools ===
Van Nest once had two Catholic grammar schools: St. Dominic's at 1684 White Plains Road and Our Lady of Solace at the intersection of Holland and Morris Park Avenues. Both schools had grades K–8. However, by 2006, Our Lady of Solace had closed its doors due to budget cuts within the New York Catholic Archdiocese. Our Lady of Solace school building remained vacant until September 2010, when the Bronx Charter School of Excellence annex opened; the school's main site is at Benedict Avenue, while the Holland Avenue site serves as only an annex for grades five and six. The School of Excellence began leasing the Solace building in August 2010, and had made $400,000 worth of renovations from electric wiring, plumbing, and exterior masonry work. The School of Excellence plans to expand to grades fifth through eighth within the next two years.

The New York Archdiocese announced in January 2011 that St. Dominic's, along with four other Bronx grammar schools, would be closing by the end of the school year in June. St. Dominic's grammar school, founded in 1952, had approximately 200 students, who needed to transfer to other schools in the area. Some of the staff members, especially the nuns will be transferring to St. Raymond's school which is located in Parkchester. Prior to its closing in the end of June 2011, a farewell Mass was held to commemorate the school's 59-year history. As of September 2015, the former St. Dominic's Catholic elementary school will be opened up as Public School 481, a school with grades K–5.

=== Library ===
The New York Public Library (NYPL)'s Pelham Parkway-Van Nest branch is located at 2147 Barnes Avenue. The branch opened in 1912 as one of NYPL's "Travelling Libraries", and between 1917 and 1968, moved to a series of permanent locations. The current building, which opened in 1968, has been known as the Van Nest or Van Nest Pelham branch through its history.

== Religious organizations ==
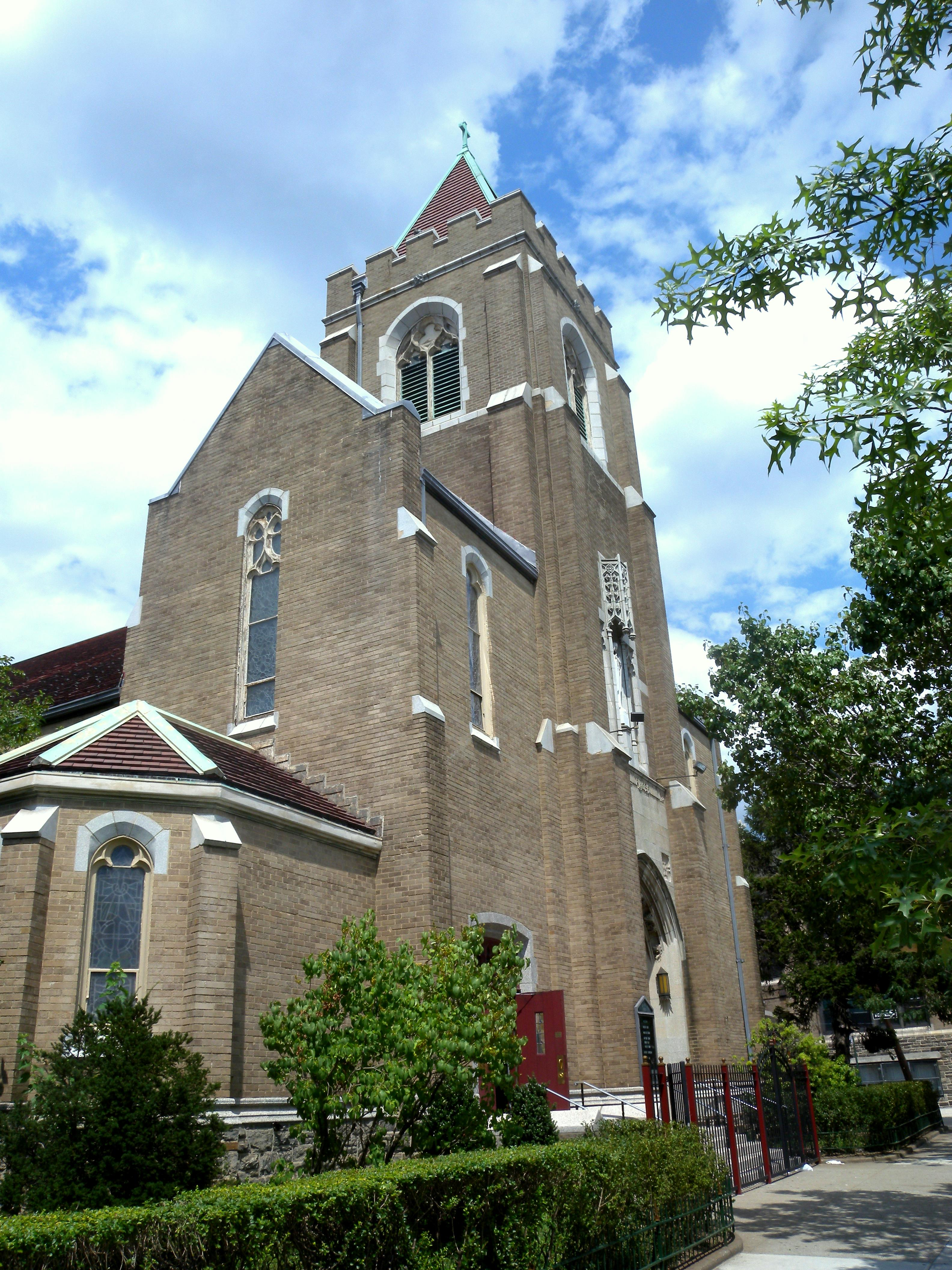
Our Lady of Solace Roman Catholic Church

=== Catholic ===
The present location of St. Dominic's Church at 1739 Unionport Road was started in 1925 and was completed in May 1927. Msgr. Domenico Fiorentino was instrumental in the construction of the church. At the dedication mass on May 8, 1927, Cardinal Hayes officiated and was a guest of honor at the dinner held after the services. Preceding the dedication mass a procession moved from Van Nest Memorial Square to the church and was attended by many local organizations one in particular the Van Nest Recreation Club, which is still in existence today. Our Lady of Solace Church is located at 731 Morris Park Avenue.

=== Protestant denominations ===
7th Day Adventist Church is located at 800 Morris Park Avenue. Episcopalian, St. Martha's is located at 1858 Hunt Avenue. Lutheran, St.Luke's is located at 1722 Adams Street. Pentecostal, Van Nest Assembly of God is located at 755 Rhinelander Avenue.

=== Jewish ===
There was as well a significant Jewish population in the later part of the 19th and early part of the 20th century in Van Nest. The synagogue located at 1712 Garfield Street was built in 1905. The B'nai Jacob First Van Nest Hebrew Congregation was established in 1895 and by the early 1920s had upwards of 50 families, a religious school within the synagogue to accommodate 80 pupils, and services in Hebrew, Yiddish, and English. By January 1979, the First Van Nest Hebrew Congregation had disbanded and sold the property and building to the Mission Christiana Rehoboth church.

== Transportation ==
The following MTA Regional Bus Operations bus routes serve Van Nest:

- Bx21: local service to Westchester Square subway station or Third Avenue–138th Street subway station (via Boston Road/Morris Park Avenue)
- Bx22: local service to Bronx High School of Science or Castle Hill (via Fordham Road/Castle Hill Avenue)
- Bx39: local service to Wakefield – 241st Street subway station or Clason's Point (via White Plains Road)
- Bx40/Bx42 local service to Morris Heights or Throgs Neck (Bx40/Bx42 operate between the Van Nest and Parkchester border lines)
- BxM10: express service to Midtown Manhattan (via Bruckner Expressway/Triborough Bridge)

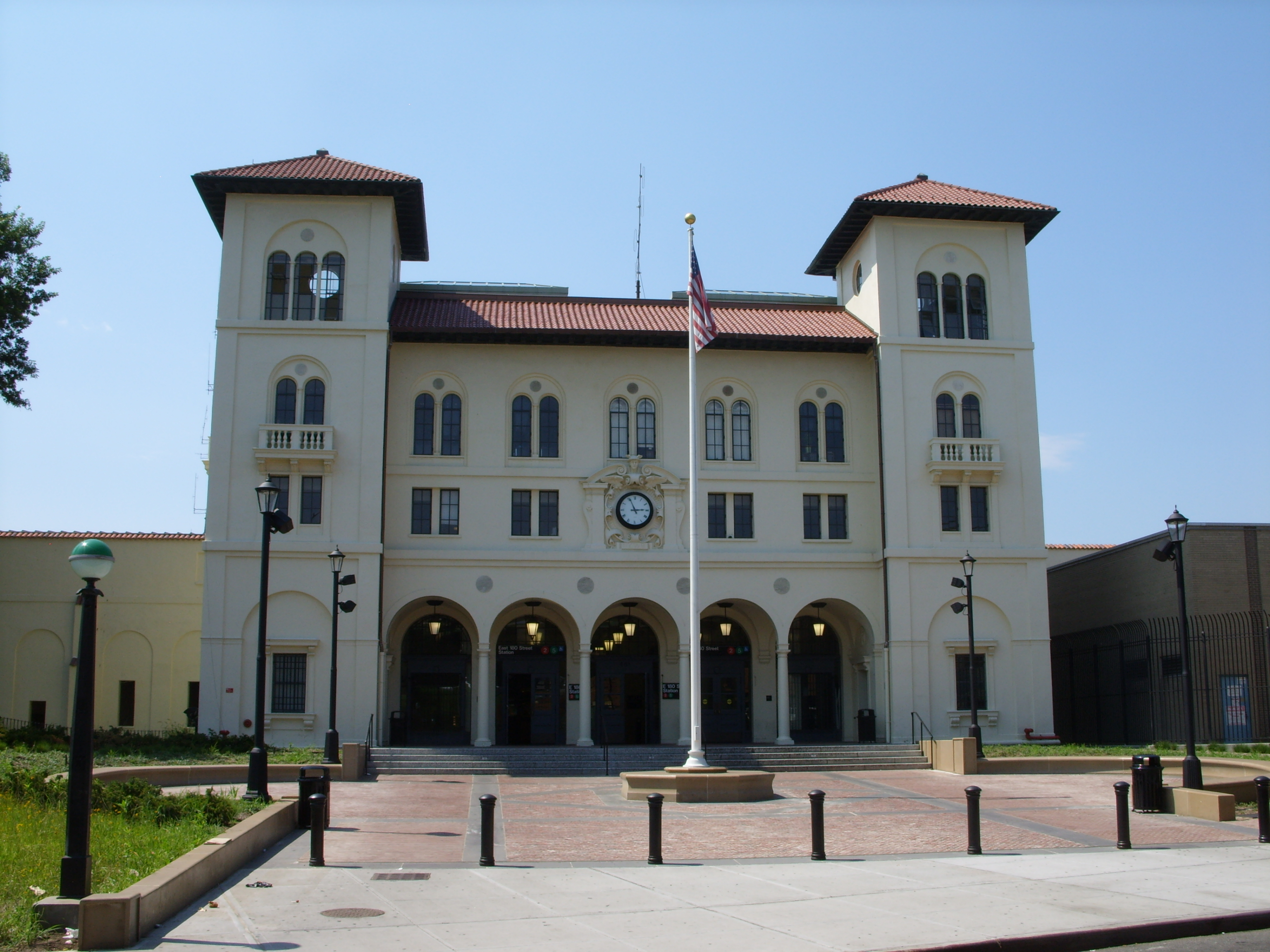
East 180th Street station

The New York City Subway's IRT White Plains Road Line (2 and 5 trains) operates along Birchall Avenue and has a stop at the Bronx Park East station. The IRT Dyre Avenue Line (5 train) occupies the old right of way of the New York, Westchester and Boston Railway (NYW&B).

The East 180th Street station on the IRT White Plains Road Line, built in 1912, was once the Administration Building for the NYW&B. The station was designed by Stem, Allen H., Fellheimer & Long, in a style reminiscent of late 19th and early 20th century revivals. It was placed on the National Register of Historic Places on April 23, 1980. From 2010 to 2013, the station underwent a major rehabilitation. The NYPD's Transit District #12 resides directly across the street from the East 180th Street station at 460 Morris Park Avenue.

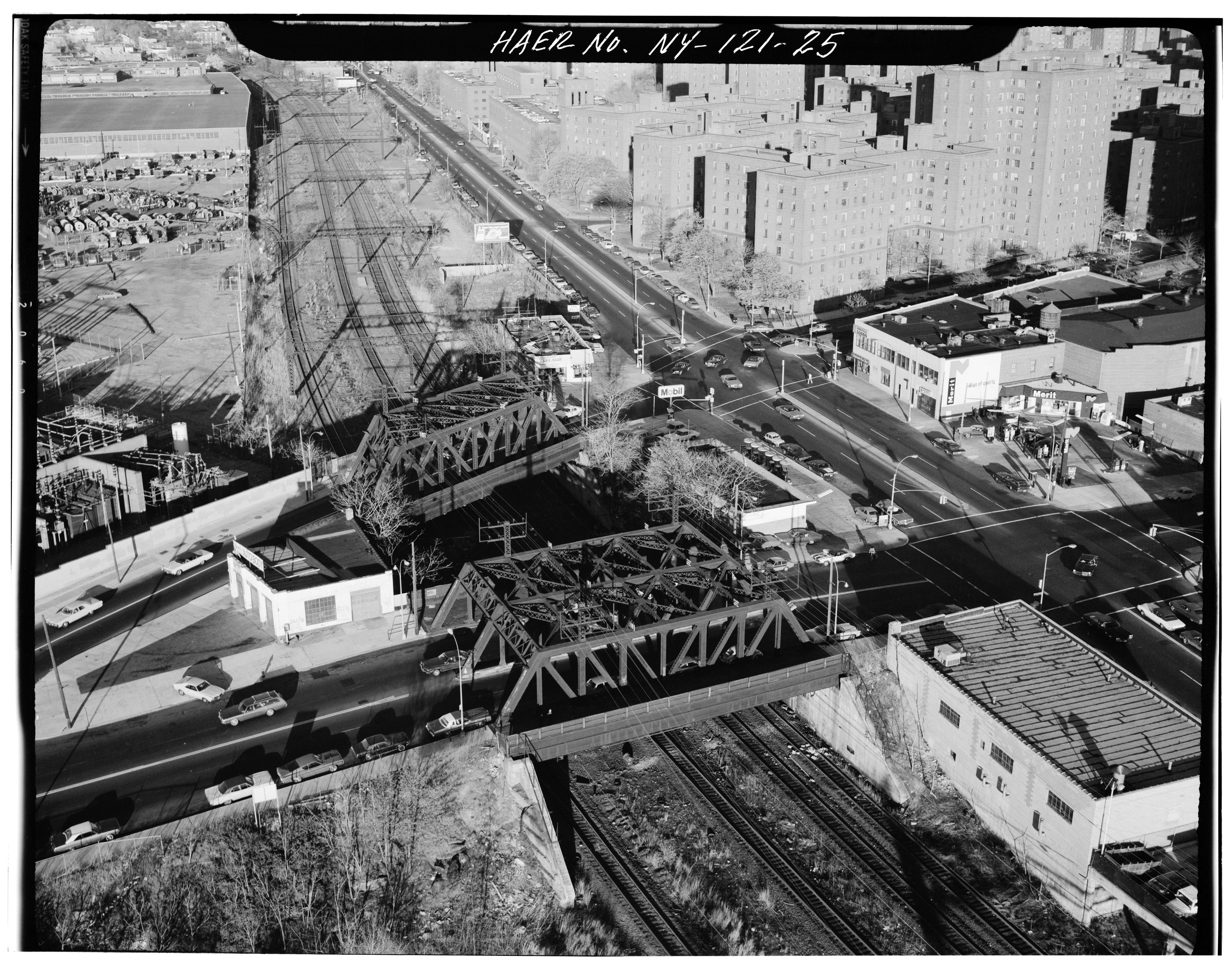
White Plains Road Bridge in foreground; Unionport Road Bridge in background. Van Nest, Bronx Co., NY. Sec. 4207, MP 12.75.-78. - Northeast Railroad Corridor, Amtrak Route HAER NY,31-NEYO,167-25

The Amtrak's Northeast Corridor is used by trains traveling to and from New York Penn Station via the Hell Gate Bridge, and connects with Metro-North's New Haven Line near New Rochelle station in Westchester. Parkchester/Van Nest station is a planned Metro-North Railroad station on the New Haven Line, which is intended to open at earliest in 2027 as part of the Metropolitan Transportation Authority’s Penn Station Access project. Located on the border of Van Nest on Tremont Avenue and just north of Parkchester’s border on White Plains Road, the station would provide commuter rail service to New York Penn Station in Midtown Manhattan and to stations in Connecticut and Westchester County. The entrance would be located on Tremont Avenue. Other possible new stations include Hunts Point, Morris Park, and Co-Op City. When built, the Parkchester-Van Nest station may occupy the footprint of the former Van Nest station.

== Notable places ==
Conti's Pastry Shoppe was established on October 1, 1921 on Victor Street and eventually relocated to 786 Morris Park Avenue in 1928. Purchased in 2003 by Sal Paljevic from the original owners, it went through a four-week renovation in February 2007 to restore its tin ceiling and wood panel walls. Other antique features include an original marble countertop, collection of black-and-white photographs and vintage tin advertisements. In the summer of 2005, the exterior of the bakery was renovated to include a retractable, old-fashioned awning and traditional display windows. Conti's Bakery is known for its Boston cream pie. In October 2021, Conti's Pastry Shoppe celebrated its 100th anniversary.

Riviera Ravioli is located at 643 Morris Park Avenue. It started out as a deli back in 1946 and eventually moved to its present location in 1976. Riviera features a wide variety of not only ravioli but specialty filled raviolis such as lobster, crab and walnut. Other types of pasta include: tortellini, cavatelli, manicotti, and fettuccine. According to its owner, Joseph Giordano the name Riviera Ravioli has its origins from the Italian Riviera which is located in the northwest portion of Italy. Giordano's descendants are from that area specifically. Riviera Ravioli has closed as of August 2014.

The Morris Park Boxing Club located at 644 Morris Park Avenue was started back in 1978 by Joe DeGuardia Sr. Joe DeGuardia, the founder's son presently owns the club. Dex Pejcinovic, a former club member and fighter oversees the daily operations. The club had a setback in December 2009 with an electrical fire which displaced members of the club and residents living in the apartments above the club. Some notable fighters to come out of the Morris Park Boxing Club include WBA world champions welterweight Aaron Davis and light heavyweight Lou Del Valle.

== Notable people ==
- Stokely Carmichael (1941–1998), a 1960s civil rights activist, moved to Van Nest in 1952 from Harlem when he was 11. Carmichael along with his father Adolphus and mother Mabel resided at 1810 Amethyst Street.
- General James F. Collins (1905–1989), a four-star general, moved to 1820 Unionport Road from Manhattan in 1909. He attended P.S. 34 from 1911 to 1919, and then Regis High School; afterward, he was appointed to the United States Military Academy at West Point.
- General William Fiorentino (born 1935) resided at 1842 Hunt Avenue in his younger years. He graduated from P.S. 34 and Cardinal Hayes High School. He attended Fordham University and graduated with a degree in physics.
- Kenneth E. Gazzola, who lived on Matthews Avenue, is an aviation professional and President and CEO of FlightLogix and board member of The Wings Club, an aviation society. He is also a board member of the Smithsonian's National Air and Space Museum.
- Carl Paul Jennewein (1890–1978), an artist and sculptor, had his studio at 538 Van Nest Avenue from 1928 until his death in 1978. On June 2, 2011, the section of Van Nest Avenue between Melville Street and Van Buren Street was renamed Carl Paul Jennewein Place in honor of the sculptor.
- Roland La Starza (1927–2009), a boxer, was born May 12, 1927, and lived on Van Nest Avenue near Van Buren Street. He attended Columbus High School, then went to City College when his boxing career took off.
- Cardinal Edwin F. O'Brien was born in Van Nest. His Irish Catholic family lived in a two-bedroom apartment in Van Nest. He is pro-grand master of the Equestrian Order of the Holy Sepulcher of Jerusalem; the pope's representative to Catholics in the Holy Land; and the chief fund raiser for the preservation of that region's sacred sites. He was ordained in 1965 by Cardinal Francis Spellman and assigned to West Point. Prior to his present position, he was Archbishop of Baltimore. Since May 1997, O'Brien has been returning to his boyhood parish of Our Lady of Solace to perform the sacrement of confirmation.
- Eugene D. Orza went to St. Dominic's elementary school and was once the general counsel of the Major League Baseball Players' Association. He graduated from St. John's University School of Law.
- Regis Philbin (1931–2020), a television personality, attended Our Lady of Solace School on Morris Park and Holland Avenues. A block of Cruger Avenue, where he lived, was renamed in his honor. In January 2010, his boyhood home at 1990 Cruger Avenue was demolished.
- Nick Sandow, was raised on Van Nest Avenue and plays the role of Joe Caputo in Orange is the New Black.
- Michael Sardo, a Hollywood writer and executive producer, grew up in Van Nest. He has written for many television series, such as Caroline in the City, Wings, and Fairly Legal.
- John Patrick Shanley (born 1950), a playwright and screenwriter, grew up in Van Nest. He wrote the script for the 1987 film Five Corners, which was set in the east Bronx and took its name from an intersection in Van Nest.
