= Parkchester/Van Nest station =

Planned rail station in the Bronx, New York

Parkchester/Van Nest
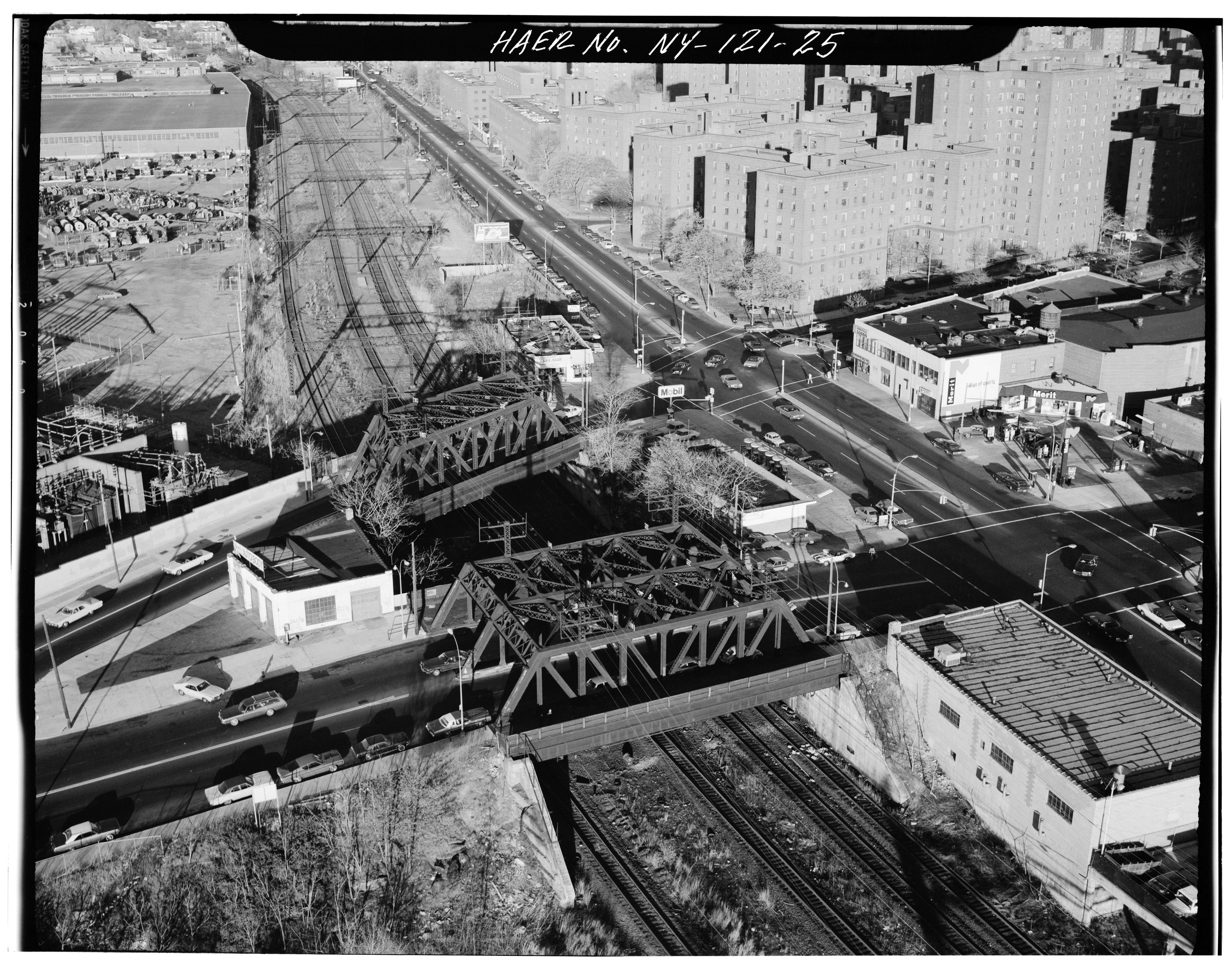
- Aerial view of the station site (background), with the former station platform visible

General information
- Coordinates: 40.8419°N 73.8626°W
- Owner: Metropolitan Transportation Authority
- Line: Hell Gate Line (Northeast Corridor)
- Platforms: 1 island platform
- Tracks: 4

Construction
- Accessible: Yes

History
- Opening: 2027 (planned)

Proposed services
| Preceding station | Metro-North Railroad | Following station |
|---|---|---|
| Hunts Point toward Penn Station | New Haven Line | Morris Park toward Stamford |
Former services
| Preceding station | New York, New Haven and Hartford Railroad | Following station |
|---|---|---|
| West Farms toward New York Harlem River | Harlem River Branch | Morris Park toward New Rochelle |
Location

Parkchester/Van Nest station is a planned commuter rail station on the Metro-North Railroad's New Haven Line, to be located within Bronx Community Board 11 in Van Nest and just north of the Parkchester neighborhood of the Bronx in New York City. The station is planned to open in 2027 as part of the Penn Station Access project, which will add four stations in the Bronx. It will be located east of Unionport Road, with entrance from East Tremont Avenue.

== History ==
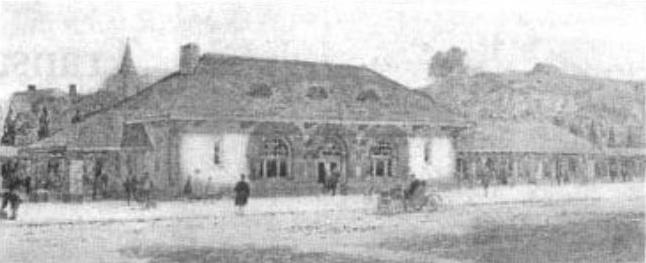
Unrealised design by Cass Gilbert

The Van Nest station of the New Haven Railroad, opened in the late 19th century, was located at the same site. The station and the Van Nest neighborhood are believed to be named for Abraham R. Van Nest, an 1870s director of the railroad. A new station building in the Dutch revival style was designed by Cass Gilbert around 1908, but never built.

The railroad's Van Nest Shops were located north of the station. A freight yard opened in 1895, with an electric locomotive repair facility built in 1912. The shops were closed in 1959, with locomotive repair moved to New Haven Yard. The site, with several original buildings still extant, has been used by Con Edison as their Van Nest Yard since 1959.

A 63-month design-build contract for the project was issued in December 2021. In August 2024, the New York City Council voted to rezone the areas around the Parkchester/Van Nest and Morris Park stations to encourage development around these stations.
