= Bronx Community Board 11 =

Bronx Community District 11 Bronx Community Board 11
- Community District
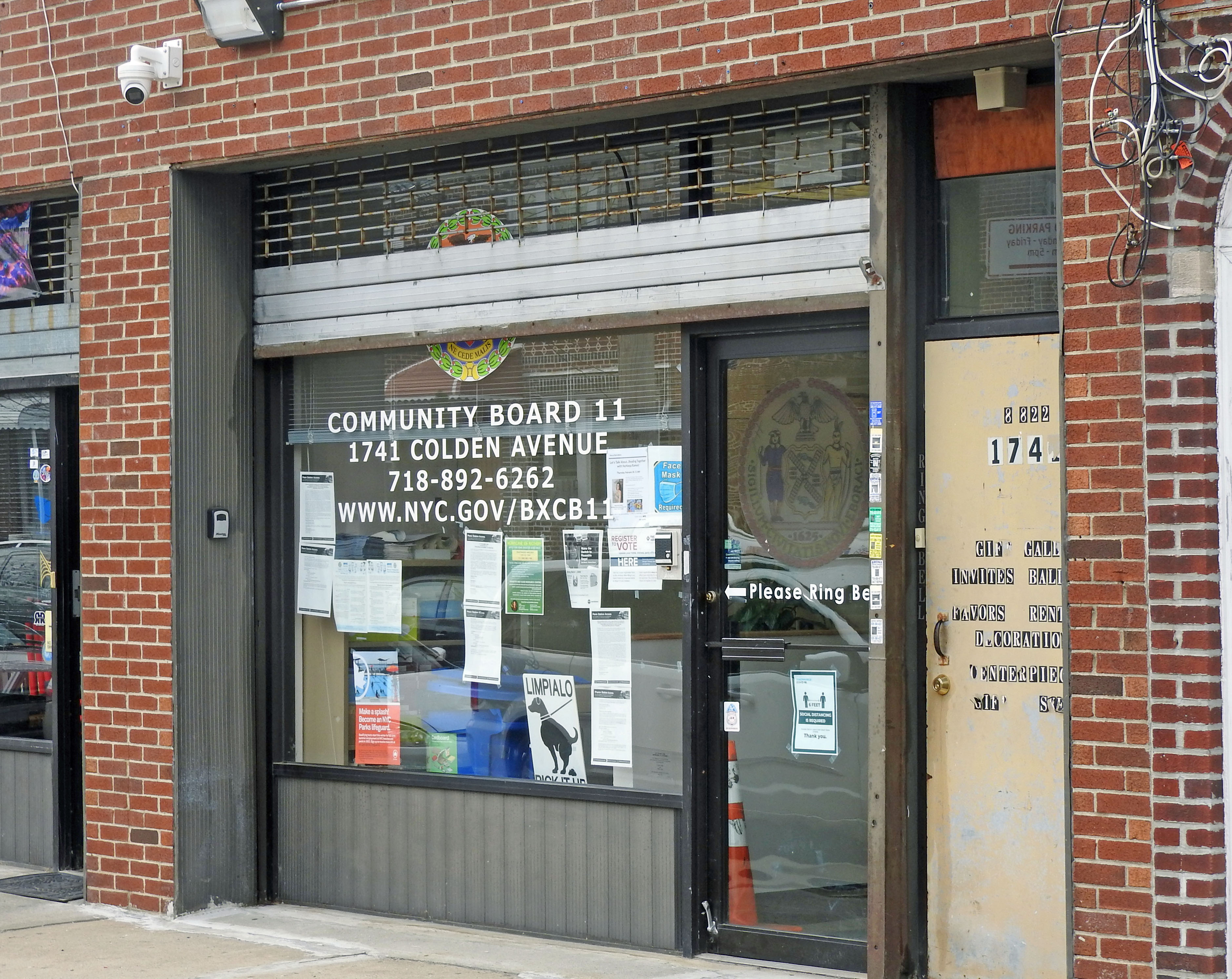
- Community Board 11 office

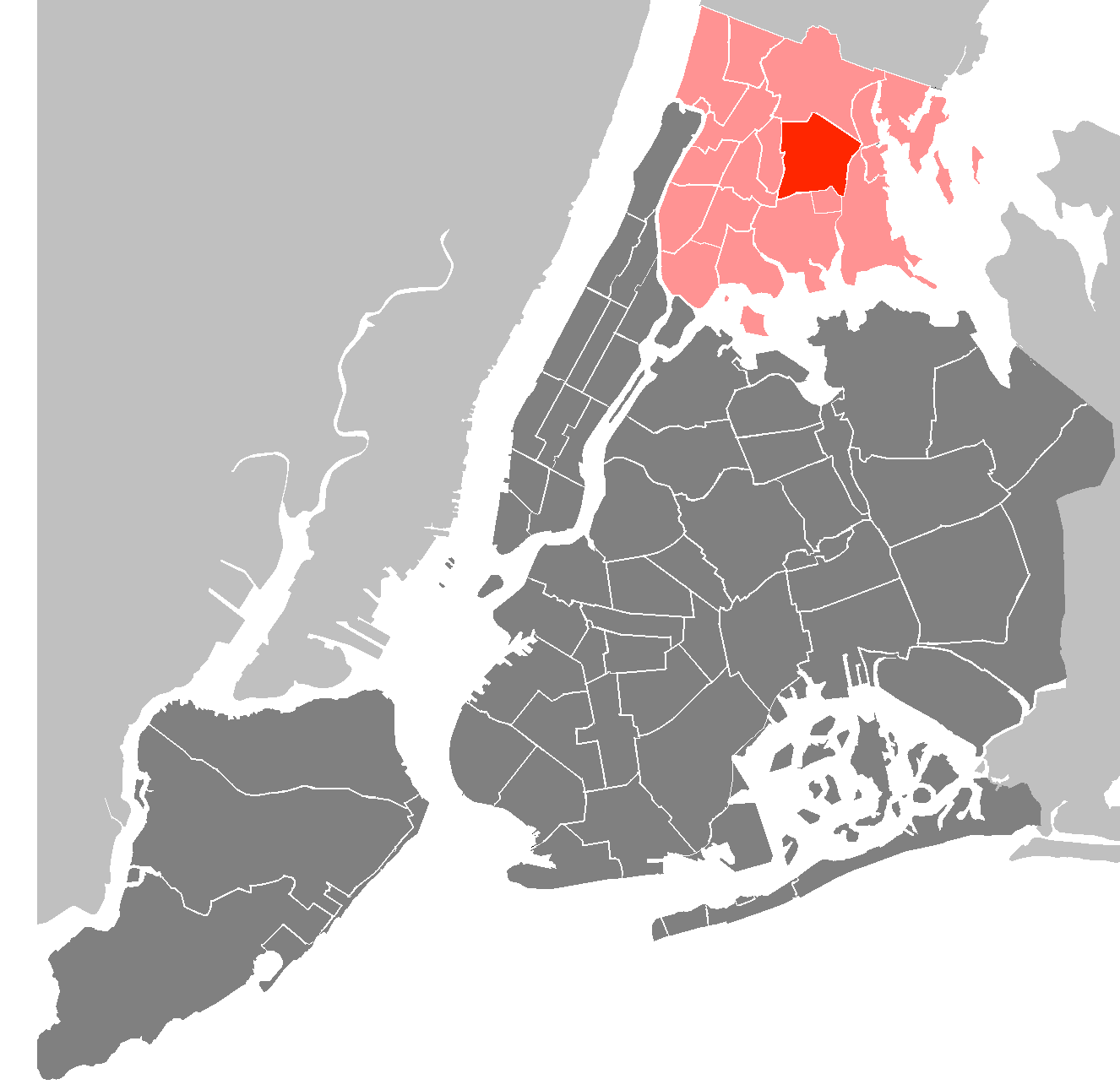
- Location in The Bronx
- Country: United States
- State: New York
- City: New York City
- Borough: The Bronx
- Neighborhoods: list: Allerton; Indian Village; Morris Park; Pelham Gardens; Pelham Parkway (neighborhood); Van Nest

Government
  - Type: Community board
  - Body: Bronx Community Board 11
  - Chairperson: Cynthia Rodriguez
  - District Manager: Jeremy Warneke

Area
  - Total: 3.6 sq mi (9.3 km^{2})

Population (2000)
  - Total: 110,706
  - Density: 31,000/sq mi (12,000/km^{2})

Ethnicity
  - Hispanic and Latino Americans: 34.63%
  - African-American: 18.1%
  - White: 37.8%
  - Asian: 6.1%
  - Others: 0.6%
  - American Indian or Alaska Native: 0.2%
- Time zone: UTC−5 (Eastern)
  - Summer (DST): UTC−4 (EDT)
- ZIP codes: 10460, 10461, 10462, 10467, and 10469
- Area codes: 718, 347, and 929, and 917
- Police Precincts: 49th (website)
- Website: www1.nyc.gov/site/bronxcb11/index.page

Bronx Community Board 11 (CB11) is a small unit of the City of New York (NYC), whose district encompasses the neighborhoods of Allerton, Indian Village, Morris Park, Pelham Gardens, Pelham Parkway (neighborhood), Van Nest and other areas in the borough of the Bronx. Coterminous with the 49th NYPD Precinct, its district is delimited by Bronx Park East and the Bronx River Parkway to the west, Adee Avenue, Boston Road and East Gun Hill Road to the north, the Hutchinson River Parkway to the east, and East Tremont Avenue to the south.

== Board's role and structure ==
Like the 58 other NYC community boards, CB11 consists of up to 50 volunteers appointed by the Borough President, although at least one half of the board's membership is selected from nominees of the district's respective Council Members. Consisting of several committees, CB11 is headed by an executive board, which consists of a chair, first vice chair, second vice chair, treasurer, secretary, and sergeant at arms.

The board plays an advises on land-use and rezoning matters. It is responsible for identifying community needs as part of the city's budget process and working with government agencies to coordinate and improve the delivery of municipal services. The board also handles special projects, including organizing and working with tenants', homeowners' and merchants' associations, developing graffiti removal, other cleanup projects, and other matters relating to the community's general welfare. Full board meetings, which are open to the public, are usually held on the fourth Thursday of the month.

== Staff history ==
=== District managers ===
From 1977 until he died in 1988, the board's first district manager was Thomas "Tom" J. Brown.

From 1989 until 1995, Assistant District Manager Thomas "Tom" F. Lucania took over. At the age of seventeen, Lucania, representing Saint Lucy's School, was a member of the board's then-Youth Services Committee before he became a board member for the first time in 1987 and, also in 1987, assistant district manager.

The board's third district manager, John Fratta, retired from CB11 after 15 years of service to the board. Prior to this, Mr. Fratta was a youth coordinator for Bronx CB7 and a clerk at the City Comptroller's Office. Notable achievements during his tenure include the Pelham Parkway reconstruction project, the opening of a New York Public Library branch on Morris Park Avenue, the revamping of zoning regulations to maintain the low-density character of the neighborhood, and establishing community groups to fight crime in Pelham Parkway and Van Nest.

Additionally, Mr. Fratta was successful at making the board office more accessible to the public and surrounding neighborhood. Prior to November 1997, CB11 was located on the eleventh floor of Jacobi Medical Center, which was perceived as an inconvenience to the community. At the time, Fratta cited State Senator Guy Velella as instrumental in moving the community board to its present location on Colden and Morris Park Avenues.

In December 2010, Jeremy H. Warneke, an Iraq War veteran from Illinois, was unanimously selected by the board to succeed Mr. Fratta as the board's fourth district manager. His term began in 2011, and in 2012, with the help of board members, staff and volunteers, he launched the board's first NYC.gov website. Also in 2012, he was allowed to preliminary select the next round of staff members, two immigrants who were hired for their language as well as technical skills.

== Civic groups ==
Operating within the boundaries and with no formal affiliation of or with the board - are many civic associations, which hold public meetings once a month or week throughout the year, excluding some summer or winter months. Their meetings usually feature guests from city, state or federal government offices but are not official events or meetings of the community board. Some groups currently active within the board's very diverse and minority represented district include but are not limited to The Friends of Pelham Parkway, The Citizens of CB11 Demand a Recall Vote, the 49th Precinct Community Council, Allerton Avenue Home Owners & Tenants Association, Morris Park Community Association, Northeast Bronx Association, Pelham Parkway Neighborhood Association and Van Nest Neighborhood Alliance.

== Size and demographics ==
The CB11 district was much smaller prior to 1975. According to the 1970 census, 96.6 percent of the district was white.

In 2020, the district's population was 119,666, up from 113,232 in 2010. In the year 2000, the district had a population of 110,706, up from 97,842 in 1990 and 99,079 in 1980.

Hispanic/Latinos made up 44.9% (53,788 persons) of the district's population in 2020. The White non-Hispanic population was 26,285 (22%), the Black non-Hispanic population was 23,567 (19.7%), and the Asian non-Hispanic population was 11,154 (9.3%).

From the year 2000, 41,839 (37.8%) were White non-Hispanic. 37,919 (34.63%) were of Hispanic origin. 20,057 (18.1%) were Black/African American Nonhispanic. 6,728 (6.1%) were Asian or Pacific Islander Nonhispanic. 3,213 (2.9%) were of Two or More Races Nonhispanic. 709 (0.6%) were Some Other Race Nonhispanic, and 241 (0.2%) were American Indian or Alaska Native Nonhispanic.

In 2016, more than half of the board members were white and over the age of 50.

== Elected officials ==
Legislative offices which make their presence known in CB11 include City Council Districts 12, 13 and 15, the 78th, 80th, 82nd, 83rd and 87th State Assembly Districts, State Senatorial Districts 32, 33, 34 and 36 and Congressional Districts 14, 15 and 16.

The city council members representing the community district are non-voting, ex officio board members. The council members and their council districts are:

- 12th NYC Council District – Kevin C. Riley
- 13th NYC Council District – Shirley Aldebol
- 15th NYC Council District – Oswald Feliz

== Housing stock ==
The housing stock throughout the community board is quite varied. The area around Pelham Parkway for example has a large number of multi-family buildings or apartments in comparison to the number of one and two family homes. Many of the buildings on Bronx Park East both north and south of Pelham Parkway are designed in the Art Deco/Art Moderne style.

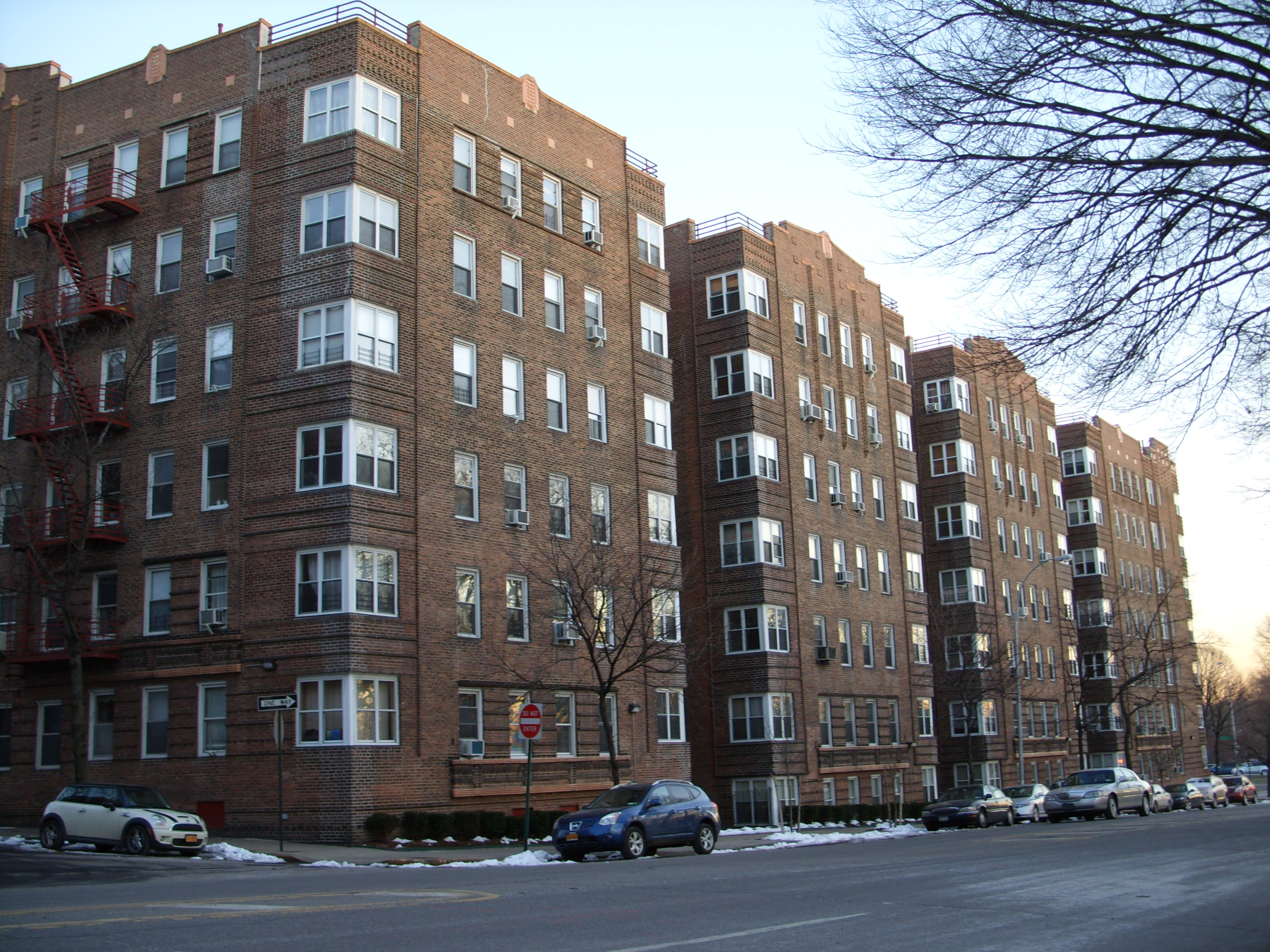
Bronx Park East and Reiss Place

Housing in areas such as Van Nest and Morris Park, generally tend to have more one and two family homes with high concentrations of apartment or multi-family buildings on White Plains and Williamsbridge Roads, respectively.
