= Pelham Manor station =

Railroad station in Pelham, New York, US

Pelham Manor
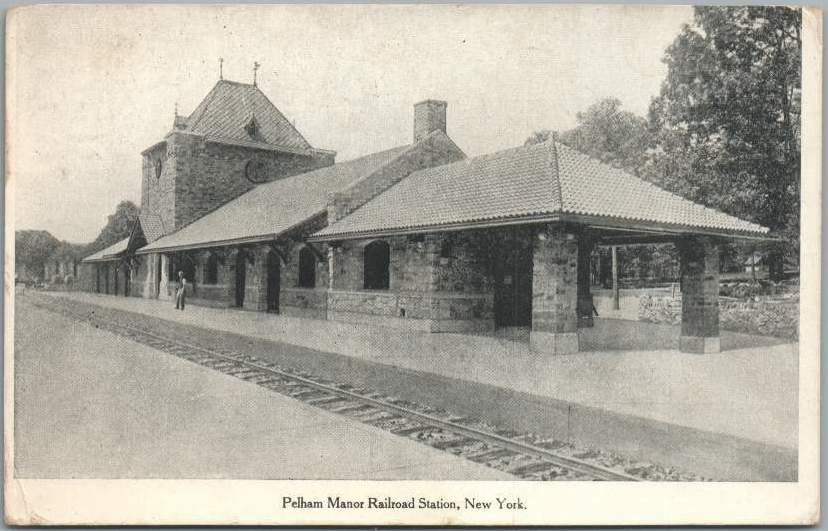
- Postcard of station house c. 1910

General information
- Location: Esplanade and Railroad Place, Pelham Manor, New York, United States
- Coordinates: 40°53′23″N 73°48′3″W

Construction
- Architect: Cass Gilbert (1908 station house)

History
- Opened: November 24, 1873
- Closed: July 27, 1930
- Rebuilt: 1907–1908
- Electrified: 1912

Former services
Preceding station	New York, New Haven and Hartford Railroad	Following station
City Island toward New York Harlem River	Harlem River Branch	Woodside toward New Rochelle
Location

Pelham Manor station was a train station located near where the later Interstate 95 and Amtrak's Hell Gate Line cross over Pelhamdale Avenue in Pelham Manor, New York, United States. The station opened in 1873 and was served by trains on the Harlem River Branch of the New York, New Haven and Hartford Railroad. After passenger service along the branch was discontinued in 1930, the Cass Gilbert–designed station house was used by the Westchester Model Club and held one of the largest model railroad layouts in the nation. The building was demolished in 1955 to make way for construction of the New England Thruway. In the early 2000s, a potential new Metro-North Railroad station at Pelham Manor was evaluated as part of the Penn Station Access project but was not advanced for further study.

== History ==
=== Commuter rail service (1873–1930) ===
When the Harlem River and Port Chester Railroad (HR&PC) was constructed from the northern side of the Harlem River to the junction with the New York, New Haven and Hartford Railroad (NYNH&H) in New Rochelle, a station along the new line was included in Pelham Manor, one and a half miles (2.4 km) north of Bartow station and two miles (3.2 km) south of New Rochelle station. The new branch line was operated by the NYNH&H under a lease from the HR&PC and designated as the NYNH&H's "Harlem River Branch".

Passenger trains along the Harlem River Branch began operating on November 24, 1873, before construction of the station houses for passengers had been completed. The first station house at Pelham Manor was a wooden frame building located on the west side of the railroad tracks, near the southern end of the Esplanade and south of where the railroad crossed Pelhamdale Avenue. The building also contained a post office and a real estate office; the post office remained in the station house until 1904.

The opening of the train station prompted real estate development in the surrounding area during the late 1880s and early 1890s, including Manor Circle on the east side of the station. Commuters working in Manhattan's Financial District could take the train from Pelham Manor to the Harlem River Terminal and connect with a steamboat such as the Shady Side that provided service to the Battery. In later years, connections from the Harlem River Terminal became available to the Second Avenue Elevated and the Third Avenue Elevated at the Willis Avenue station.

After the turn of the century, a series of improvements to the Harlem River Branch was made by the NYNH&H, which included expanding the line to six tracks, eliminating grade crossings and commissioning architect Cass Gilbert to design new station houses. For the station at Pelham Manor, Gilbert designed a one-story, 110-by-30-foot (33.5 by 9.1 m) stone and concrete structure with a square tower and a corrugated tile roof. The building contained a large waiting room and a men's smoking room. The use of stone in the building was selected to complement with the existing surroundings, which included a retaining wall at the approach to the station. The new station house was constructed from 1907 to 1908; it was located just south of the old station, opposite the end of the Esplanade; Four of the six tracks of the branch line at the station included platforms for passengers. There was a side platform located next to the station house and two island platforms. A 125-foot-long (38 m) underpass allowed passengers to cross below the tracks and access both of the island platforms as well as Manor Circle; staircases from Pelhamdale Avenue were also provided to the platforms. The new station house was originally expected to cost $50,000, but the actual cost is believed to be $125,000. The December 1908 issue of Architectural Record described the Pelham Manor station as "a particular pleasure to behold". In his 1970 book on American railroad stations from 1831 to 1920, author Edwin P. Alexander considered Pelham Manor to be "perhaps the most elaborate and finest suburban station the New Haven ever had".

The area around the Pelham Manor station became known as "Depot Square" and also included a post office and grocery store. In 1907, a new post office building was constructed at the southern end of the Esplanade, across the street from the station house, which remained in operation until 1936. Depot Square was also served by a trolley line operated by the Westchester Electric Railway, which operated northward along Pelhamdale Avenue to the Pelham station on the main line of the NYNH&H. The trolley schedule was aligned to meet the trains at both train stations. The line was known as the "Toonerville Trolley", as it inspired the creation of the Toonerville Folks comic strip by cartoonist Fontaine Fox. In 1910, the trolley line was extended southward to Shore Road to provide service to the New York Athletic Club at Travers Island. When "Games Day" was held at Travers Island, Pelham Manor station had to have four ticket windows open to accommodate those purchasing return tickets.

The Harlem River Branch was electrified in 1912. Pelham Manor station was well patronized and passenger trains along the branch operated at twenty-minute headways until 1921; however, by 1930 trains service had been subsequently reduced to only two daily trains per direction. Passenger service along the Harlem River Branch was discontinued on July 27, 1930, due to a lack of patronage. The reduction of passenger service along the Harlem River Branch in the 1920s is thought to have been a result of the NYNH&H's takeover of the New York, Westchester and Boston Railway (NYW&B), which also operated out of the Harlem River Terminal, so that the NYNH&H could grow ridership on the NYW&B.

=== Reuse of station building (1937–1953) ===
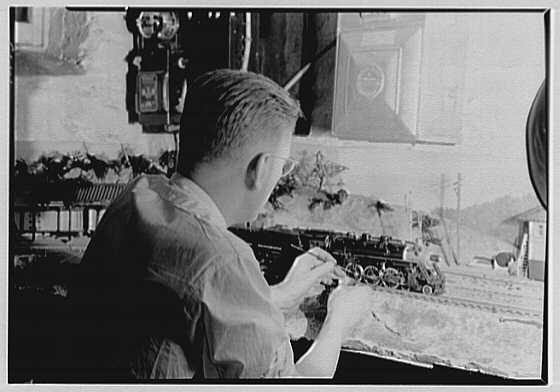
William F. Crosby working on a model railroad at his home in 1941

In 1937, the Westchester Model Club began using the vacant station house for a model railroad layout. The club had been formed in 1934 by a group of model enthusiasts and previously occupied an entire floor of a building in New Rochelle for its model railroad layout, meeting rooms and a workshop. When the club announced it would be moving into the Pelham Manor station, the group was headed by Edwin P. Alexander of New Rochelle. Alexander was the president of the American Model Railroad Company, which had constructed a model railroad exhibit of the Baltimore and Ohio Railroad that was displayed at the Empire State Building; other members included Pelham Manor residents William F. Crosby and Charles A. Penn, who served as editor of Rudder and Mechanical Craftsman, respectively. Before the NYNH&H let the club use the station house, the railroad had planned to demolish the building in an effort reduce its tax expenses.

Within one and a half years, club members installed over 1,500 feet (460 m) of track and completed the main division of "The Eastern Line", scaled at one-quarter inch to the foot (O gauge), which was considered to be one of the most extensive model railroad layouts in the United States. A machine shop located in a corner of the station contained equipment for building and repairing models. Most of the rolling stock was built by members, as commercial kits were not available for about 80 percent of the cars and locomotives. In 1941, the layout was expanded to include a scale replica of the Pelham Manor station that had taken two years to construct. The estimated value of the model railroad layout fell between $25,000 and $30,000. The model railroad layout eventually grew to include 4,500 feet (1,400 m) of track and a rolling stock of 750 cars and locomotives, but closed in 1953 because the station house was slated to be demolished to allow for construction of the New England Thruway. The exhibit had been drawing 10,000 annual visitors, and on one occasion the NYNH&H ran a special train from Penn Station to Pelham Manor so fans could view the layout. Most of the model railroad equipment was packed into a boxcar lent by the NYNH&H and stored in the yard at the New Rochelle station while the club searched for new space. The Pelham Manor station house was demolished in 1955.

=== Proposals for new train station ===
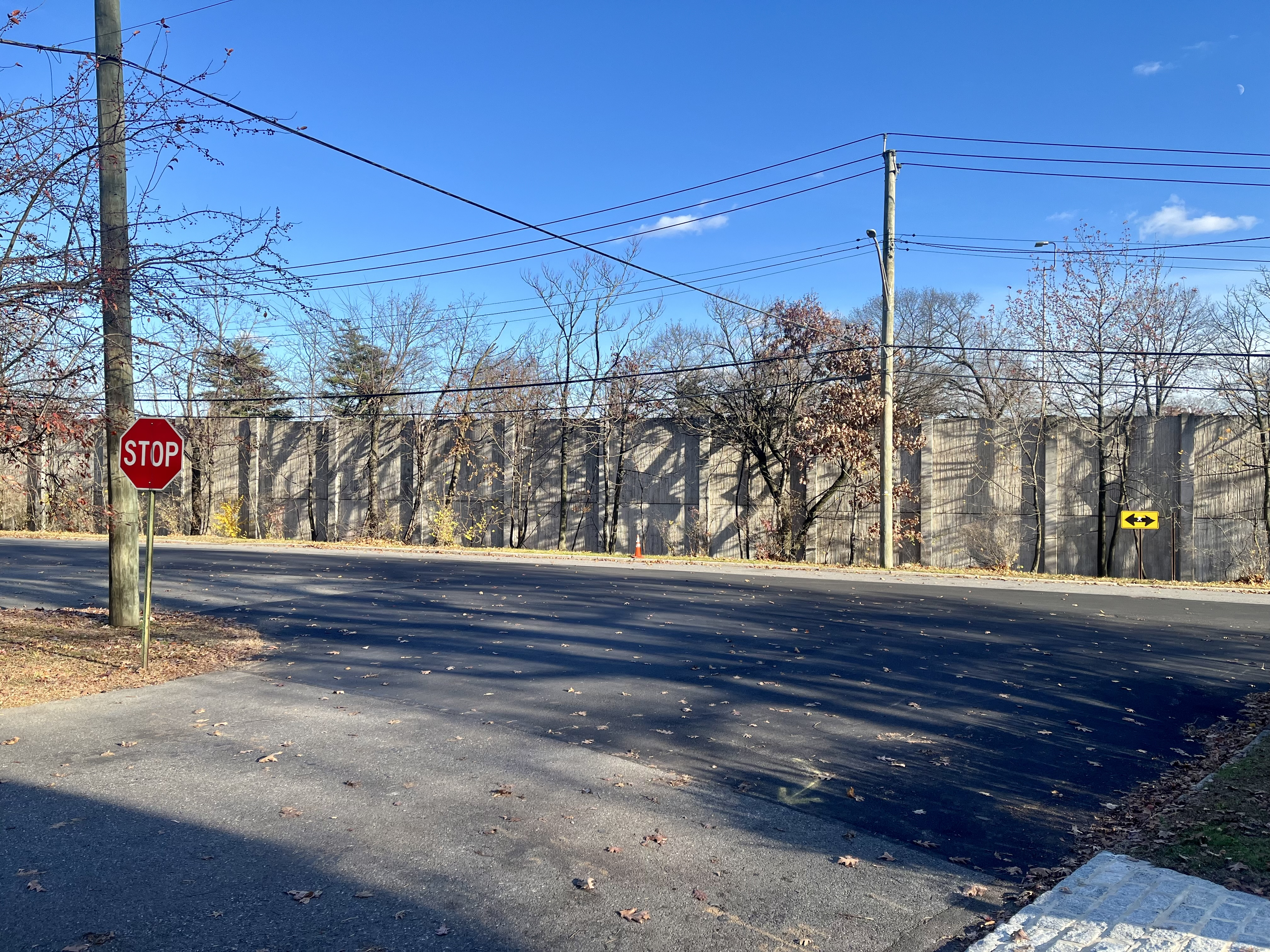
View of the former station site from the south end of Esplanade in 2025, now occupied by I-95 behind the noise wall

While not proposed officially, in June 1973, Yonkers Mayor Alfred DelBello and Congressmen Jonathan B. Bingham and Ogden Reid sought to have commuter trains run from Stamford, Connecticut to Penn Station via the Hell Gate Bridge, making stops at Pelham Manor, Co-op City and Parkchester. This was intended to be an interim service operated by the Metropolitan Transportation Authority (MTA) pending completion of the Second Avenue Subway (which at the time was planned to extend into the Bronx). Their plan was opposed by the MTA due to rush hour capacity issues in the East River Tunnels.

In the early 2000s, the potential of a new Pelham Manor station was formally studied by Metro-North Railroad as part of the screening of alternatives for Penn Station Access, which identified and assessed potential new station locations for New Haven Line trains operating to Penn Station via the Hell Gate Bridge as a complement to the Long Island Rail Road's East Side Access project. Although the study projected that Pelham Manor station would have over 1.3 million annual riders in 2020, only about 20 percent of these would be new transit trips. The option to construct a Metro-North station at Pelham Manor was not advanced for further study because it would not generate as much new transit trips compared to other locations as well as other issues related to station design, site access and parking.
