= Hunterspoint Avenue station =

Hunterspoint Avenue station may refer to:

- Hunterspoint Avenue station (LIRR), Long Island Rail Road
- Hunters Point Avenue station, New York City Subway 7 train

== See also ==
- Hunts Point Avenue station, New York City Subway 6 train
- Hunts Point station, future Metro-North station
