= Morris Park station (Metro-North) =

Planned rail station in the Bronx, New York

Morris Park

General information
- Coordinates: 40.8507°N 73.8432°W
- Owner: Metropolitan Transportation Authority
- Line: Hell Gate Line (Northeast Corridor)
- Platforms: 1 island platform
- Tracks: 4

Construction
- Accessible: Yes

History
- Opening: 2027 (planned)

Proposed services
Preceding station	Metro-North Railroad	Following station
Parkchester/Van Nest toward Penn Station	New Haven Line	Co-op City toward Stamford
Former services
Preceding station	New York, New Haven and Hartford Railroad	Following station
Van Nest toward New York Harlem River	Harlem River Branch	Westchester toward New Rochelle
Location

Morris Park station is a planned passenger rail station on the Metro-North Railroad's New Haven Line, to be located in the Morris Park neighborhood of the Bronx in New York City. The station is planned to open in 2027 as part of the Penn Station Access project. It will be located at Morris Park Avenue adjacent to the Albert Einstein College of Medicine, with entrances from both sides of the tracks. Groundbreaking took place in December 2022.

== History ==
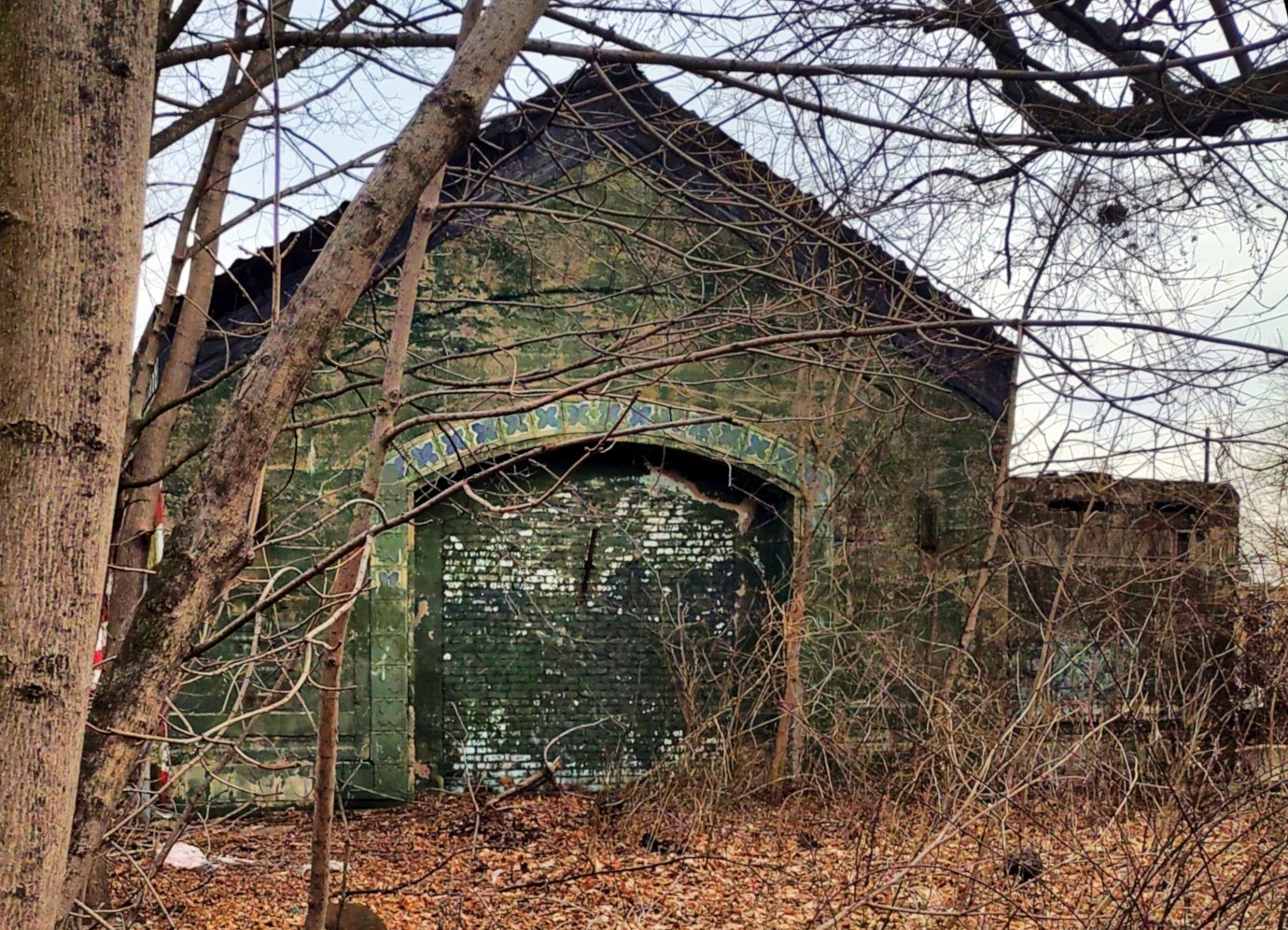
The former Morris Park station in 2022

The New Haven Railroad had two stations serving the Morris Park area. Westchester station was located about 1/4 mile (0.40 km) to the south of the proposed station site at Eastchester Road, while the Morris Park station was located further south at the corner of Sacket and Paulding Avenues. A large freight yard was located on the south side of the tracks from Eastchester Road to Pelham Parkway. New station buildings at both locations were designed by Cass Gilbert in 1908. The Morris Park station building survives; the new Westchester station (along with several others on the line) was never built.

A 63-month design-build contract for the Penn Station Access project was issued in December 2021. In August 2024, the New York City Council voted to rezone the areas around the Parkchester/Van Nest and Morris Park stations to encourage development around these stations.
