= City Island station =

Railway station in the Bronx, New York

City Island
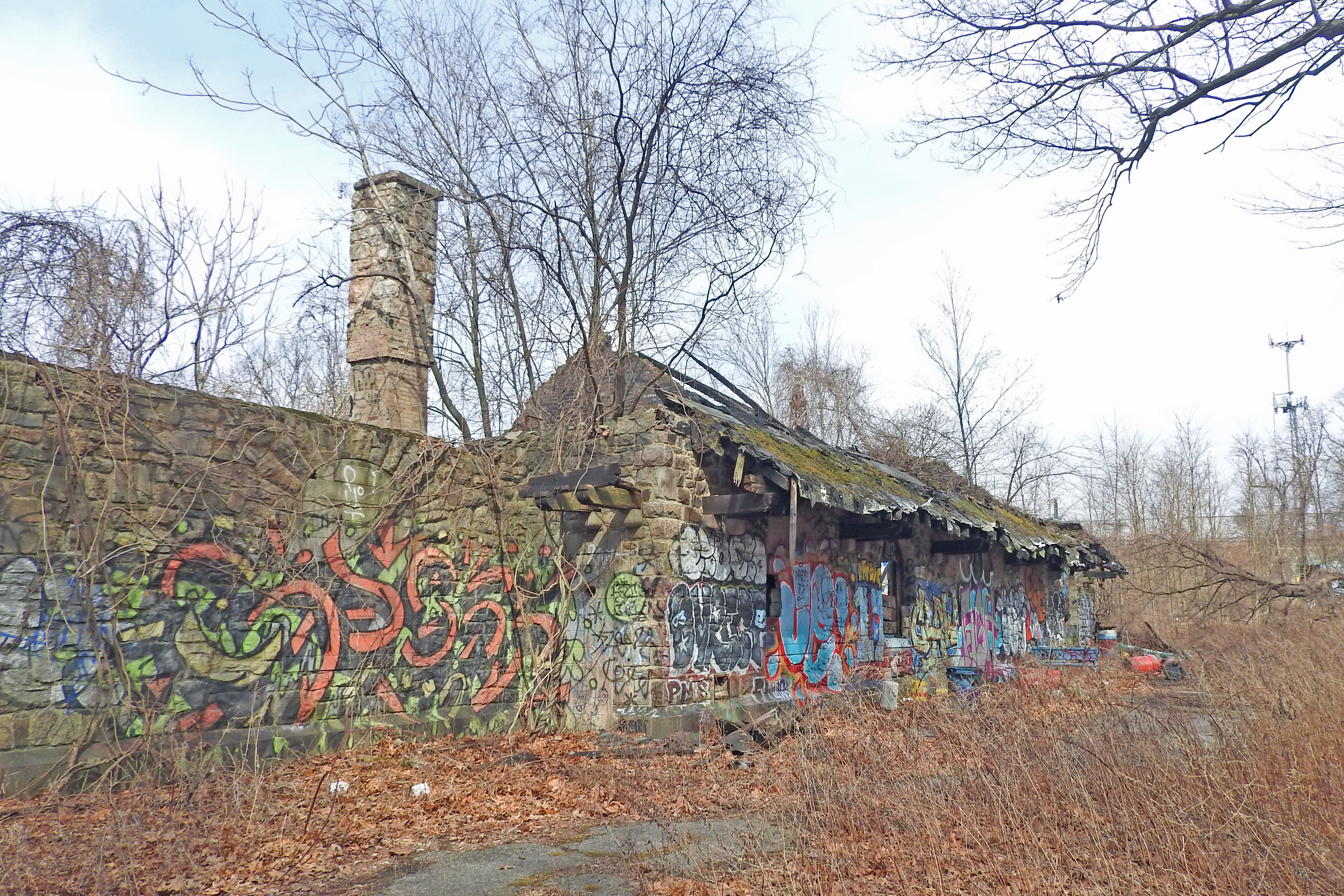
- Bartow station as seen in March, 2022

General information
- Location: Near City Island Road, Bronx, New York, United States
- Coordinates: 40°52′08″N 73°48′47″W
- Owner: Amtrak

Construction
- Architect: Cass Gilbert

History
- Opened: 1873
- Closed: 1930s
- Former names: Bartow

Former services
Preceding station	New York, New Haven and Hartford Railroad	Following station
Baychester toward New York Harlem River	Harlem River Branch	Pelham Manor toward New Rochelle
Location

City Island station, is a former railway station within Pelham Bay Park, along the Hell Gate Line in the Bronx, New York. A larger stone station house was designed for the station by Cass Gilbert and built in 1908, remaining in use up until the 1930s. The station is along what is currently Amtrak's Northeast Corridor.

== History ==
The original station was built in the early 1870s in the then Town of Pelham, for the Harlem River and Port Chester Railroad, a railroad between New York City and Port Chester, New York. In 1873, the line opened as part of the New York, New Haven and Hartford commuter railroad service. Between 1884 and 1919, the Pelham Park and City Island Railway ran between this station and Marshall's Corner on City Island, Bronx, extending to the end of City Island at Belden Point by 1892. The line opened from the Cass Gilbert-designed Bartow station to Marshall's Corner on May 20, 1887. Five days later operations were extended across the bridge to City Island and along City Island Avenue to Brown's Hotel.

=== Etymology of original name ===
Bartow station is named after the small hamlet which sat near it, once referred to as Bartow and Bartow-on-the-Sound.
