= Hell Gate Line =

Railroad line in New York

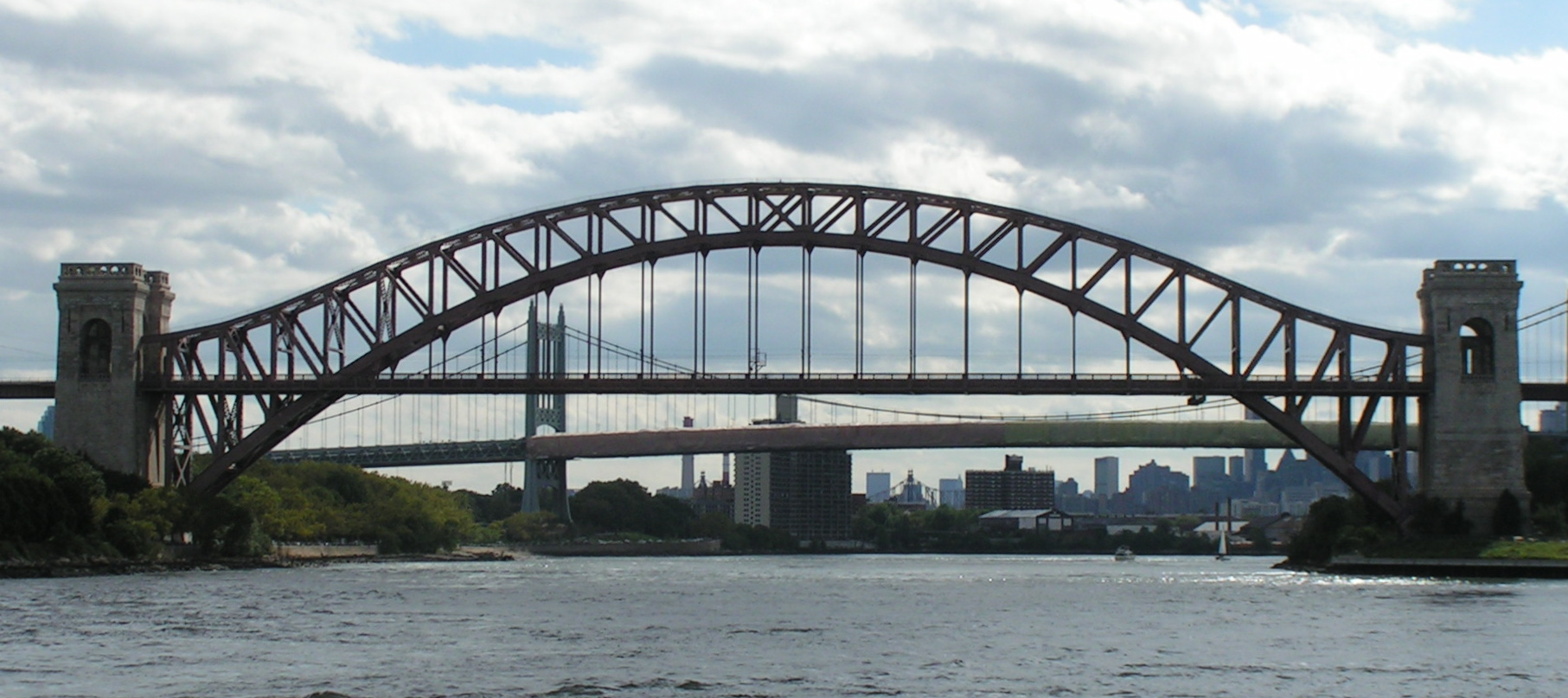
- The Hell Gate Line crosses Hell Gate on the Hell Gate Bridge

Overview
- Status: Active

Service
- Operator(s): Amtrak; Providence and Worcester Railroad; CSX Transportation

The Hell Gate Line is the portion of Amtrak's high-speed Northeast Corridor between Harold Interlocking in Sunnyside, Queens, and Shell Interlocking in New Rochelle, New York, within the New York metropolitan area.

The first portion of the line was built by the Harlem River and Port Chester Railroad, and opened in 1873 as the Harlem River Branch of the New York, New Haven and Hartford Railroad. Commuter service ran along the line from the Harlem River Terminal up to main-line New Haven in New Rochelle until 1931. Electrified service on the line began in 1911, and the line was extended to Penn Station across the Hell Gate with the completion of the Hell Gate Bridge. Metro-North Railroad is currently planning to reinstitute local commuter service on the line as part of the first phase of Penn Station Access.

== Harlem River and Port Chester Railroad ==
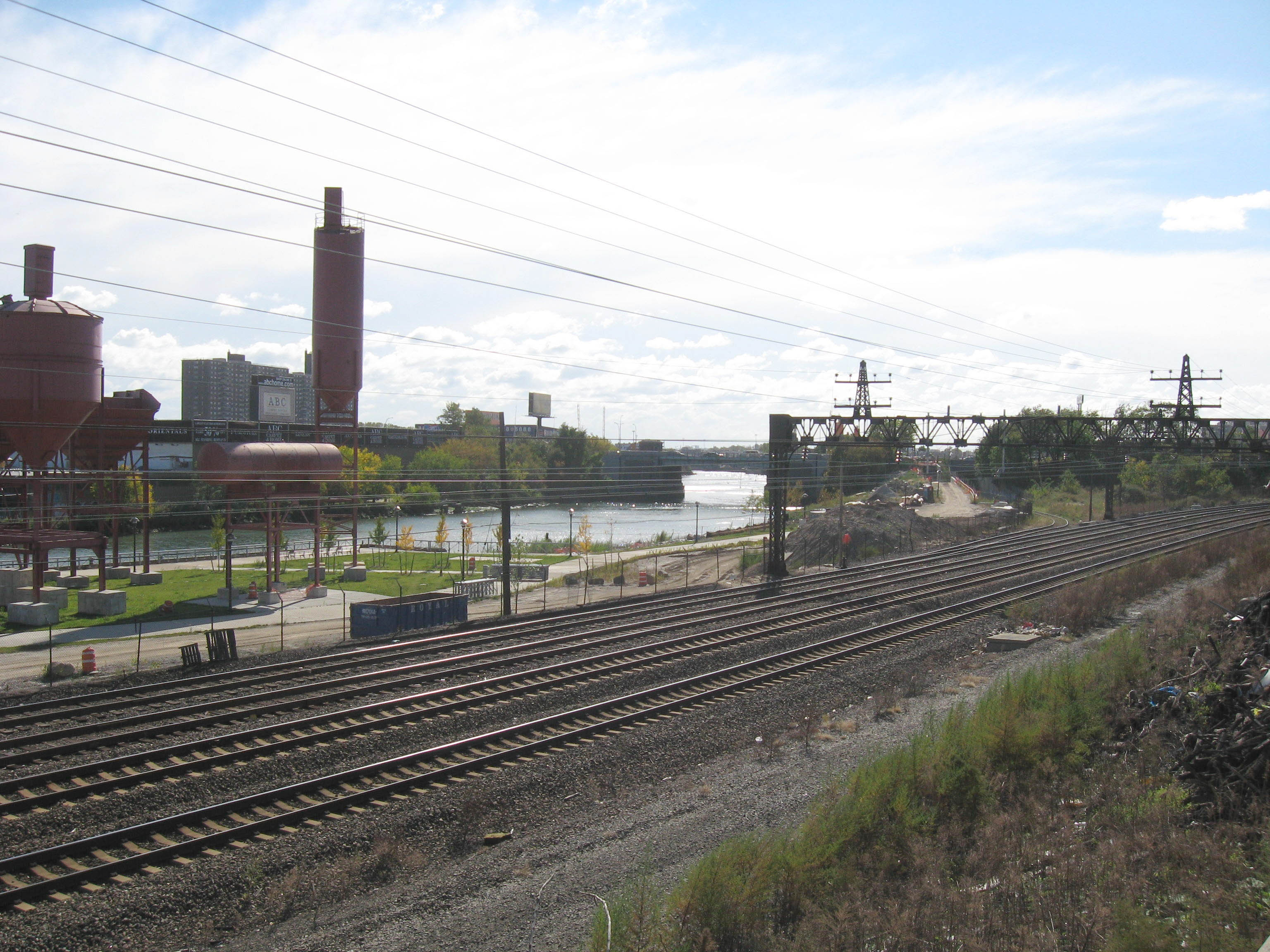
Tracks along the Bronx River, south of Westchester Avenue

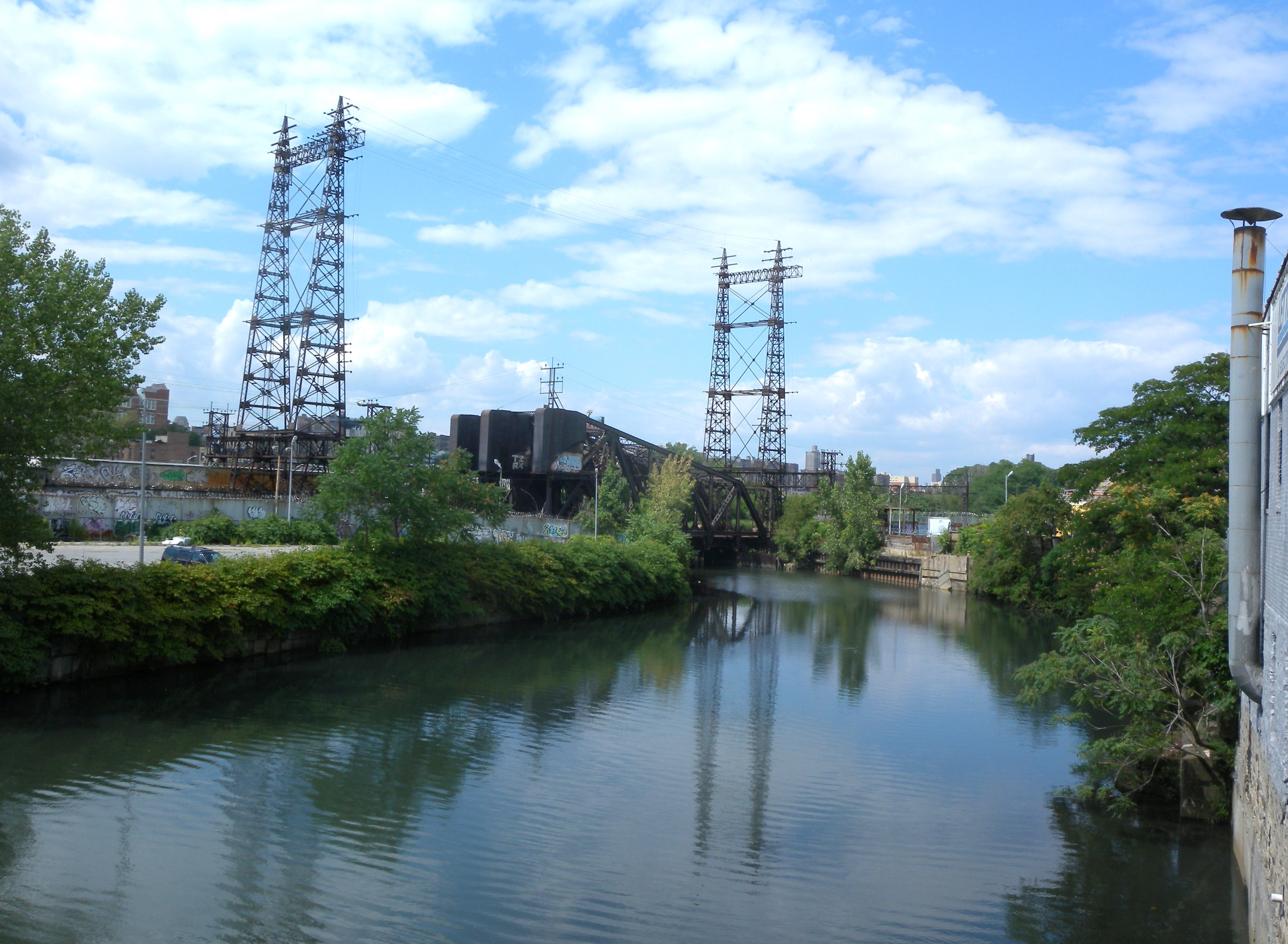
Bronx River crossing

The Harlem River and Port Chester Railroad was chartered April 23, 1866 as a branch line from the Harlem River at the north end of the Harlem Bridge (now the Third Avenue Bridge) in New York City to the Village of Port Chester in Westchester County, New York at the Connecticut state border. Only the southern portion was completed, terminating instead about five towns southwest of Port Chester in New Rochelle. At the time, New Rochelle was the final railroad station when traveling from Connecticut before entering New York City.

== Early New Haven Railroad operation ==
The New York and New Haven Railroad and the Hartford and New Haven Railroad merged to create the larger New York, New Haven and Hartford Railroad in 1872. The HR&PC was leased by the New Haven Railroad in 1873 and opened later that year, running from the New Haven at New Rochelle south into the Bronx. Leasing the line enabled the New Haven to establish a continuous line of service from Connecticut to Manhattan. The HR&PC provided freight service between New York City and the Harlem River Yard. Commuter service ran along the line from the Harlem River Terminal up to main-line New Haven in New Rochelle until 1931.

== Construction of the Hell Gate Bridge ==
The New York Connecting Railroad was incorporated on April 21, 1892, and was jointly owned by the New York, New Haven and Hartford Railroad (the "New Haven") and the Pennsylvania Railroad (PRR).

The Hell Gate Bridge was conceived in the early 1900s to link New York and the Pennsylvania Railroad (PRR) with New England and the New York, New Haven, and Hartford Railroad (NH). In June 1906, the NH applied for and received a franchise to operate trains from the northeastern suburbs of New York City to Pennsylvania Station in Midtown Manhattan, built by the PRR. The New Haven would be able to accomplish this by constructing a spur from the four-track New Haven Railroad and New York Central Railroad main line in the Bronx (these railroads are now respectively the modern-day New Haven Line and Harlem Line of the Metro-North Railroad). The spur, now the Port Morris Branch, would split north of Melrose station in the South Bronx, then merge with the Harlem River and Port Chester Railroad (HR&PC; now part of the Northeast Corridor) just north of the Harlem River. The HR&PC would pass from the Bronx to Queens via the Hell Gate Bridge, then continue south through Queens, eventually connecting to the East River Tunnels and Penn Station. As part of the plan, the Hell Gate Bridge would carry four tracks, which would connect to the NH's four-track lines on either side of the Hell Gate.

Construction was overseen by Gustav Lindenthal, whose original design left a gap of 15 feet (4.6 m) between the steel arch and the masonry towers. Fearing that the public assumed that the towers were structurally integral to the bridge, Lindenthal added aesthetic girders between the upper chord of the arch and the towers to make the structure appear more robust. The original plans for the piers on the long approach ramps called for a steel lattice structure. The design was changed to smooth concrete to soothe concerns that asylum inmates on Wards and Randall's islands would climb the piers to escape.

The engineering was so precise that when the last section of the main span was lifted into place, the final adjustment needed to join everything together was just 5/16 inch (7.9 mm). Construction of the Hell Gate Bridge began on March 1, 1912 and ended on September 30, 1916. The bridge was dedicated and opened to rail traffic on March 9, 1917, with Washington–Boston through trains first running on April 1. It was the world's longest steel arch bridge until the Bayonne Bridge opened in 1931.

The New Haven's system was extended across the Hell Gate Bridge to the New York Connecting Railroad upon the line's construction. The system of electrification was an extension of the New Haven's revised 11/22 kV autotransformer architecture. The original electrification extended from the New Haven's main line, across the Hell Gate Bridge, to the Bay Ridge yard. The line south of Bowery Bay Junction was de-electrified in the 1950s.

On July 29, 1911, NH began electric service on its Harlem River Branch, a suburban branch that would become a main line with the completion of the New York Connecting Railroad and its Hell Gate Bridge. The bridge opened on March 9, 1917, but was operated by steam with an engine change at Sunnyside Yard east of Penn Station until 1918.

The New York, Westchester and Boston Railway commuter rail line opened in 1912, paralleling the HR&PC just to the west, south of the crossing of the Bronx River. Until 1924, when a new combined station was built, the short Willis Avenue Spur of the elevated IRT Third Avenue Line ran to the Harlem River terminal of the HR&PC and the NYW&B.

In 1917 the New York Connecting Railroad opened for passenger service between the HR&PC at Port Morris and the Pennsylvania Tunnel and Terminal Railroad at Sunnyside Yard. This allowed NYNH&H trains to run over the HR&PC and into New York Penn Station, though most continued to serve Grand Central Terminal until Amtrak took over intercity operations in 1971.

On January 1, 1927 the HR&PC was merged into the New York, New Haven and Hartford Railroad. The NYNH&H was merged into Penn Central in 1969, and Penn Central became part of Conrail in 1976. The HR&PC was ultimately sold to Amtrak and is now part of their Northeast Corridor used by its high-speed Acela Express.

== Penn Central ==
In February 1968 PRR merged with its rival New York Central Railroad to form the Penn Central (PC). Penn Central was required to absorb the New Haven in 1969 as a condition of the merger, which brought the entire Washington–Boston corridor under the control of one company.

On September 21, 1970 all New York–Boston trains except the Turboservice were rerouted into Penn Station from Grand Central; the Turboservice moved on February 1, 1971 for cross-platform transfers to the Metroliners.

== Amtrak ==
The line between New Rochelle and the Harold Interlocking was transferred to Amtrak in 1976 upon dissolution of Penn Central. The electrification system continued to be controlled as a portion of the ex-New Haven system until the 1987 conversion to 60 Hz operation.

When the New Haven main line was converted by Metro-North to 60 Hz operation, the Amtrak Hell Gate line was also converted, but as an isolated system powered from the Van Nest substation. Control of the catenary system was transferred from Cos Cob to the Load Dispatcher at New York Penn Station. Although conversion occurred subsequent to the PRR-era electrification, Amtrak substation numbers 45-47 were assigned for consistency with the rest of the PRR numbering scheme.

A 1969 proposal by the North Bronx Transportation Project considered running trains via the Hell Gate Bridge to Penn Station, with travel times estimated to be 25 minutes. Some plans for the Second Avenue Subway included integration with the upper portion of the line, providing express service from the East Side of Manhattan to Co-op City and Parkchester. This line was also considered for through-running with the Northeast Corridor in New Jersey, easing travel for residents of Westchester and Connecticut trying to get to New Jersey.

While not proposed officially, in June 1973, two Congressmen and the Mayor of Yonkers proposed having trains run from Stamford, Connecticut, to Penn Station, making stops at Pelham Manor, Co-op City, and Parkchester/Van Nest. They proposed that the line be operated by the MTA pending completion of the Second Avenue Subway, which was under construction at the time and slated to be completed in 1980. Sixty percent of Co-op City residents that responded to a survey said that they would have used the proposed rail service.

== Planned improvements ==
Amtrak has applied for $15 million for the environmental impact studies and preliminary engineering design to examine replacement options for the more than 100-year-old, low-level movable rail Pelham Bay Bridge (just west of Pelham Bridge) over the Hutchinson River in the Bronx that has been limiting speed and train capacity. The goal is for a new bridge to support expanded service and speeds up to 110 mph (180 km/h).

== Penn Station Access ==
The Penn Station Access project was initiated on September 2, 1999 when the Federal Transit Administration (FTA), in conjunction with Metro-North Railroad, issued a Notice of Intent (NOI) to prepare a Major Investment Study/Environmental Impact Statement (EIS). The EIS was intended to consider possible additions to Metro-North using existing rail lines, with the intention of providing flexibility and increased regional access. Rail alternatives originally considered included Hudson and New Haven service, via the Empire Connection and Hell Gate Line, respectively, and a Harlem Line option via wyes at Mott Haven and Spuyten Duyvil.

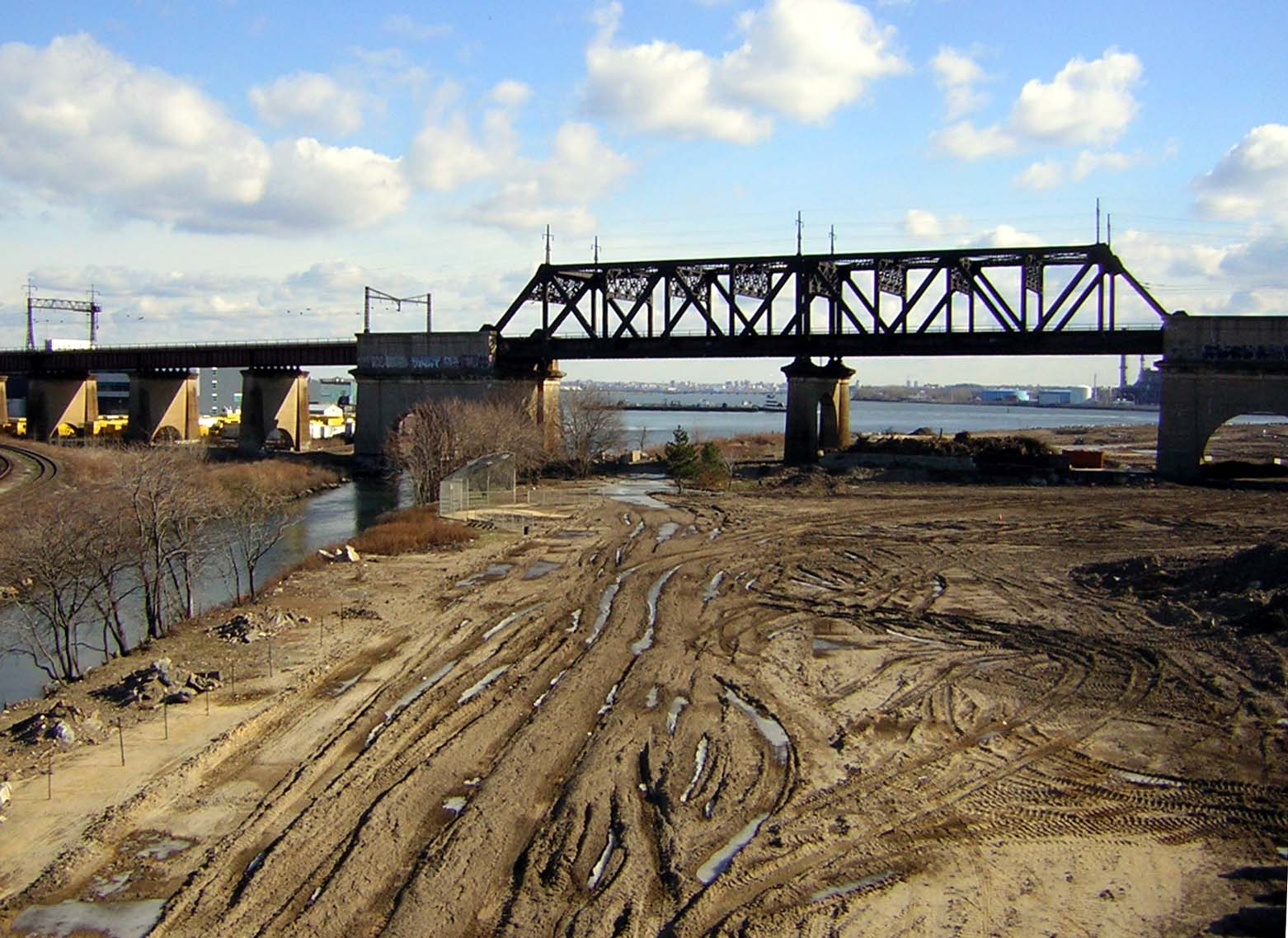
The Final Scoping Document for Penn Station Access called for the New Haven Line to use the Hell Gate Line (pictured) to access Penn Station

In November 2000, the Final Scoping Document for Penn Station Access was completed, showing 18 alternatives, including a no-build option, a Transportation Systems Management option, various commuter rail options, and alternatives using other modes. Various alternatives considered various ways to run service to Penn Station from the New Haven Line, the Hudson Line, and the Harlem Line, either during all times, or only operating during off-peak hours and weekends. Existing Metro-North riders would have the choice of arriving at either Penn Station or Grand Central on the New Haven Line and the Hudson Line. Service from the New Haven Line would diverge at New Rochelle, using Amtrak's Hell Gate Line to access Penn Station, while service from the Hudson Line would split off at Spuyten Duyvil station via Amtrak's Empire Connection. The alternatives via the Harlem Line would have required the construction of wye tracks. One option would have branched off of the Harlem Line at Mott Haven, using a wye track to go north via the Hudson Line. Using a newly-constructed wye track at Spuyten Duyvil, service would turn south via the Empire Connection before reaching Penn Station. Another option considered would have constructed a wye track at Woodlawn, allowing Harlem trains to go east and head down the Hell Gate Line to Penn Station. The final option would have required the reconstruction of the Port Morris Branch and the Hell Gate Line. An additional option would have extended service from Grand Central to Penn Station through the construction of a new tunnel.

In September 2002, a second screening took place narrowing five alternatives to four, and narrowing 20 potential station locations in the Bronx, Queens and Manhattan to five locations. The remaining alternatives considered would have used either the Hudson or New Haven Lines. The Harlem Line options were removed from consideration. The five remaining stations under consideration were at West 125th Street and West 59th Street under the Hudson alternative, and at Co-Op City, Parkchester and Hunts Point under the New Haven alternative. The preferred alternatives would have used three miles of trackage, and would have involved the construction of six new Metro-North stations in the Bronx and Manhattan, allowing riders in these areas to easily access Penn Station, Westchester, Dutchess, and Putnam counties upstate as well as Fairfield and New Haven counties in Connecticut. Existing Metro-North riders would have the choice of arriving at either Penn Station or Grand Central on the New Haven Line and the Hudson Line.

By 2011, Metro-North had initiated a federal environmental study for Penn Station Access, to be completed by 2013. The cost of the project was estimated at $350 million with the state of Connecticut funding $100 million and the state of New York funding the remaining $250 million.

The first piece of Penn Station Access would route some New Haven Line trains down Amtrak's Northeast Corridor to Penn Station. The New Haven Line to Grand Central splits off from the Northeast Corridor near New Rochelle. The Northeast Corridor (also known here as the Hell Gate Line) continues south crossing the Pelham Bay Bridge into the Bronx, the Hell Gate Bridge into Queens, and entering Manhattan through the East River Tunnels also used by the Long Island Rail Road. This phase includes the construction of four new Metro-North stations in the Bronx to be served by the New Haven Line, located in Co-op City, Morris Park, Parkchester/Van Nest, and Hunts Point. The stations would provide fast, direct rides to West Midtown and facilitate reverse-commuting trips to Westchester County and Connecticut. The new stations would provide transit access to the transit-deficient East Bronx.

Previously, a station was also considered to be built in Astoria; however, analysis showed that there wouldn’t be enough riders to justify the high cost of constructing a station. The construction of a station was projected to cost over $20 million, and the station would only be able to be 4-car lengths long. The station would only have a projected annual ridership of 310,367. Since 2014, local residents have pushed to have a Metro-North station built in Queens, either between 41st and 44th Streets in Astoria, or at Northern Boulevard and Broadway in Woodside.

=== Planning ===
On January 8, 2014, former New York Governor Andrew Cuomo voiced support for the project in his 2014 State of the State address. With his support for the project, $695 million was budgeted for the project in the MTA's 2015–2019 Capital Program. In order to accommodate more trains, power and signal systems, and yards at Penn Station and New Rochelle will be upgraded and three railroad bridges will be rehabilitated or replaced. In addition, a third track will be installed between the Parkchester/Van Nest station and north of the Co-Op City station, and additional switches will be added. Metro-North service to Penn Station will begin after the completion of the East Side Access project, which will divert some Long Island Rail Road trains to Grand Central, therefore opening up slots at Penn Station for Metro-North service. During peak hours there will be between six and ten trains to Penn Station. There will be four trains per hour to Connecticut in the reverse peak direction, and there will be two trains per hour to and from Penn Station during off-peak and weekends.

The project would add redundancy to the regional transportation network in case of service interruption. Regional connectivity will be increased with accessible transfers to Amtrak, the Long Island Rail Road and New Jersey Transit at Penn Station. Through-running between the New Haven Line and New Jersey Transit would be possible, linking business centers in Connecticut and New Jersey while providing access to Newark Liberty Airport. The draft Environmental Assessment was to be made available for public review in late 2018.

At the MTA's Metro-North Railroad Committee meeting on January 22, 2019, it was announced that Amtrak and the MTA had reached an agreement regarding track usage rights, and $35 million was approved for initial engineering design work. In addition, HNTB New York Engineering and Architecture received a $35 million contract to consult on the planning of the four new stations. In exchange for being allowed to use the Hell Gate Line and build the four stations, the MTA agreed to replace the Pelham Bay Bridge across the Hutchinson River, as well as pay access fees for using the Hell Gate Bridge. Amtrak and the MTA also agreed to conduct a joint study on the feasibility of extending Amtrak service to Long Island via the tracks used by the LIRR. As part of the project, three track interlockings would be built, one existing interlocking would be rehabilitated, and the line would be widened from three to four tracks between the Hell Gate and Pelham Bay Bridges.

Design for the project began in February 2019, and construction was expected to begin in late 2020, with an expected opening by 2023. By February 2020, the MTA had identified three firms that were qualified to bid on the design–build contracts for Penn Station Access. At that point, the project's opening date was announced as 2024. Shortly afterward, work was placed on hold due to the COVID-19 pandemic in the United States. The Federal Transit Administration (FTA) published a draft environmental impact statement in May 2021, and the state government commenced a request for proposals for the project's development. The project's completion was then announced for 2025. The expanded services will operate at Moynihan Train Hall, an expansion of Penn Station into the neighboring James A. Farley Building.

On September 28, 2021, the FTA issued a Finding of No Significant Impact for the project, allowing the project to move forward.

== Infrastructure ==
Amtrak owns the entire line up to New Rochelle, New York, where it merges with the New Haven Line, which is owned by Metro-North Railroad.

This line is electrified using the former New Haven Railroad's system, which supplies 12.5 kV at 60 Hz.

== Station listing ==
Locality	Milepost	Station	Lat/long	Notes/Connections
The Bronx	0.0	Harlem River Terminal / Willis Avenue		Also connected to IRT spur and NYW&B
The Bronx	NYCR joins HR&PC from Hell Gate Bridge			
The Bronx	0.91	Port Morris		Also connected to NYW&B
The Bronx	1.90	Casanova		Also connected to NYW&B
The Bronx	2.57	Hunts Point		Also connected to NYW&B. Today a retail block
The Bronx	3.19	Westchester Avenue		Also connected to NYW&B
The Bronx		West Farms		
The Bronx		Van Nest		
The Bronx		Morris Park		
The Bronx		Westchester		
The Bronx		Baychester		
The Bronx		City Island		Also called Bartow station
Westchester		Pelham Manor		
Westchester		Woodside		
Westchester	HR&PC joins NYNH&H Main Line			
Westchester		New Rochelle		
Acquired by New York, New Haven and Hartford Railroad in 1927

== See also ==
- New Haven Line
- Oak Point Yard
- List of New York, New Haven and Hartford Railroad precursors

== Sources ==
- PRR Chronology
