= Flying Lady =

Flying Lady may be:

- Flying Lady (TV series), a British 1987–1989 TV series
- Spirit of Ecstasy, the hood ornament on Rolls-Royce cars
- a monorail system by Pelham Park and City Island Railway
