= Hunts Point station =

Planned rail station in the Bronx, New York

Hunts Point
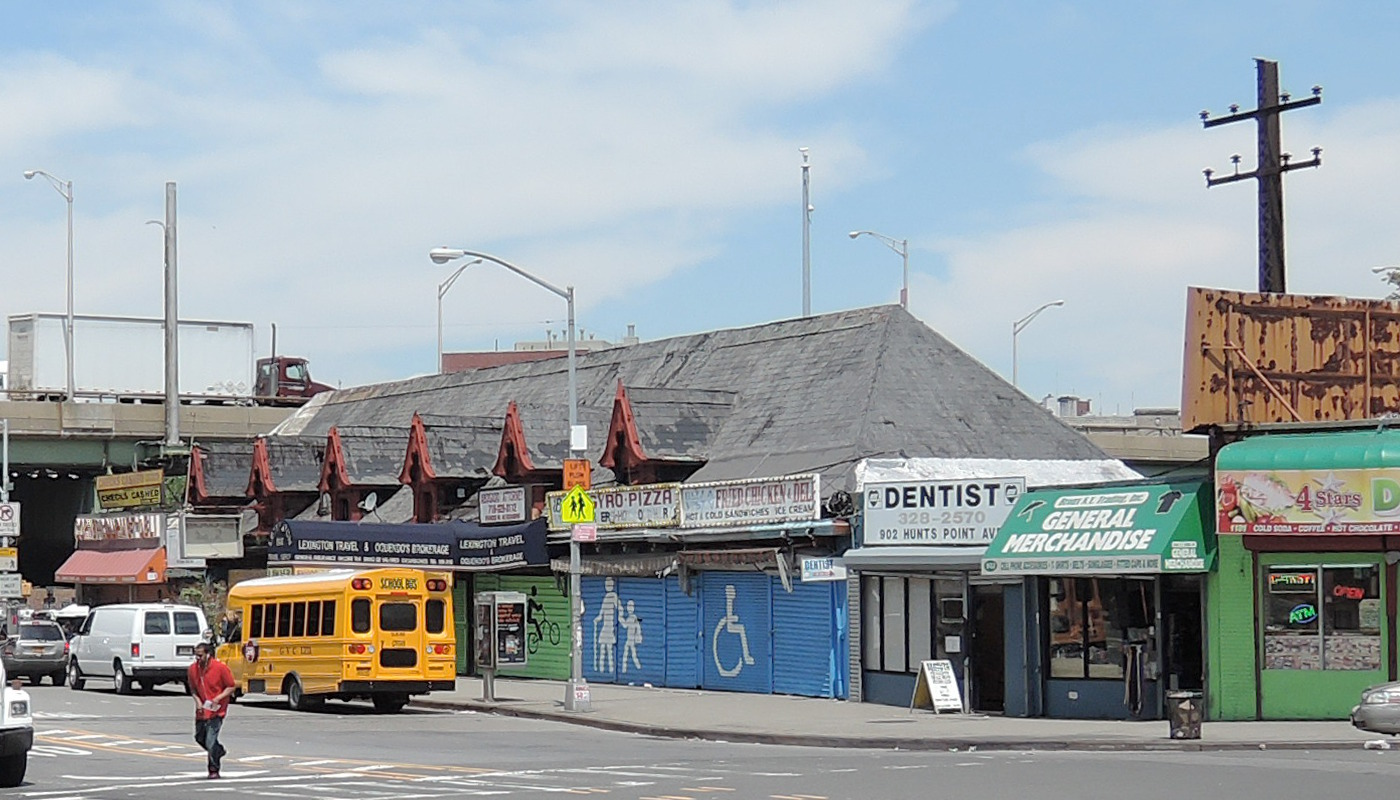
- The former Hunt's Point station in May 2013. The new station will be located below street level behind this building.

General information
- Coordinates: 40.8204°N 73.8892°W
- Owner: Metropolitan Transportation Authority
- Line: Hell Gate Line (Northeast Corridor)
- Platforms: 1 island platform
- Tracks: 3

Construction
- Accessible: Yes

History
- Opening: 2027 (planned)
Former services
Preceding station	New York, New Haven and Hartford Railroad	Following station
Casanova toward New York Harlem River	Harlem River Branch	Westchester Avenue toward New Rochelle
Preceding station	New York, Westchester and Boston Railway	Following station
Casanova toward Harlem River	Main Line	Westchester Avenue toward White Plains or Port Chester via Columbus Avenue

Proposed services
Preceding station	Metro-North Railroad	Following station
Sunnyside toward Penn Station	New Haven Line	Parkchester/Van Nest toward Stamford
Location

Hunts Point station is a planned passenger rail station on Metro-North Railroad's New Haven Line, to be located in the Hunts Point neighborhood of the Bronx in New York City. The station is planned to open in 2027 as part of the Penn Station Access project, which will add four stations in the Bronx. The station will be located north of Hunts Point Avenue, behind the former New York, New Haven and Hartford Railroad station, which was designed by Cass Gilbert.

A 63-month design-build contract for the project was issued in December 2021. Groundbreaking took place in December 2022.
