= Boynton Bicycle Railroad =

Monorail in Brooklyn, New York (1889–90)

Coordinates: 40.575437°N 73.959450°W

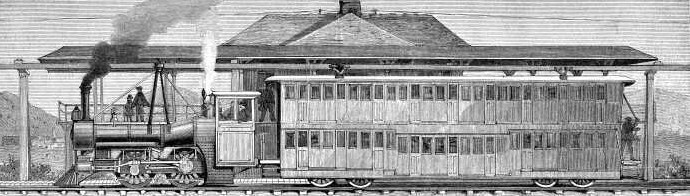
Train of the Boynton Bicycle Railroad

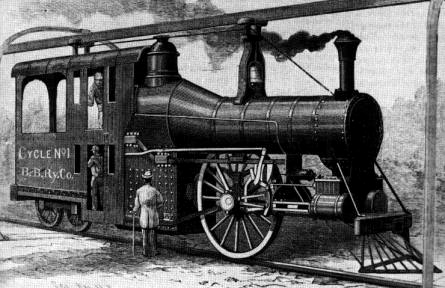
Steam locomotive of the Boynton Bicycle Railroad with a double-deck cab, with the fireman on the bottom and the engineer on the top

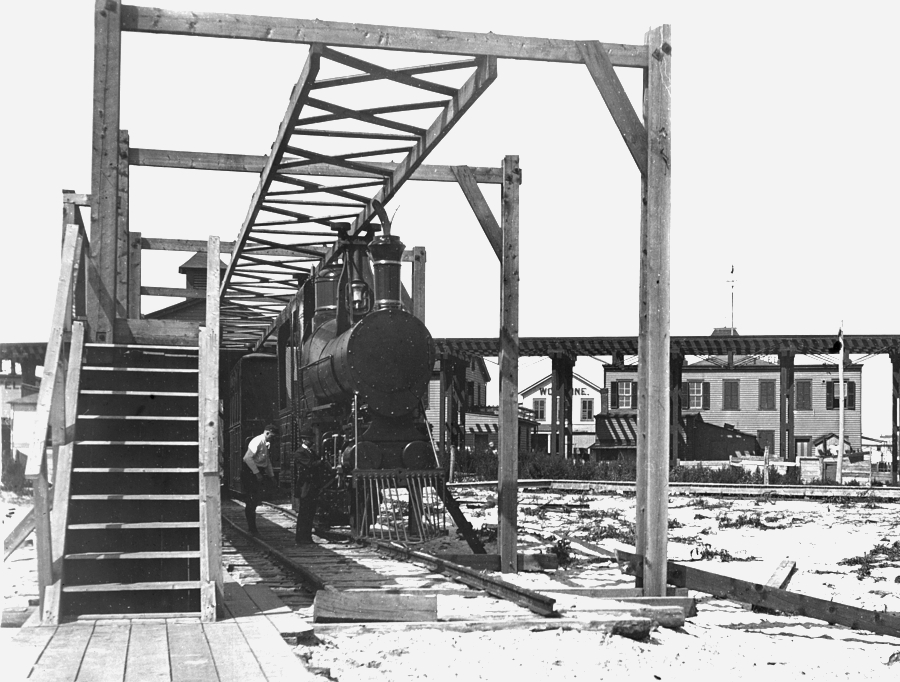
Steam locomotive of the Boynton Bicycle Railroad

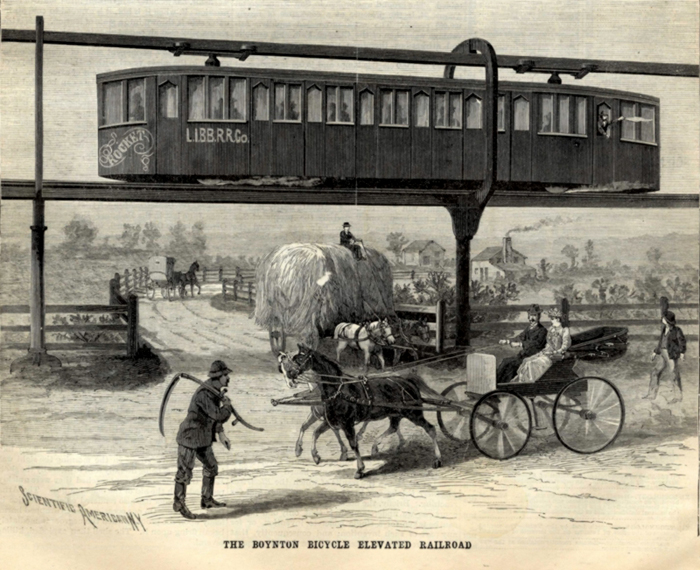
Boynton Bicycle Elevated Railroad as shown in the Scientific American of February 17, 1894

The Boynton Bicycle Railroad was a monorail in southern Brooklyn, New York, within what is now New York City. It ran on a single load-bearing rail at ground level, but with a wooden overhead stabilizing rail engaged by a pair of horizontally opposed wheels. The railway operated for only two years, from 1889 to 1890.

== History ==
The concept was invented by Eben Moody Boynton, who hoped that this would eventually replace the conventional rail road, because it was cheaper to build than a conventional two-rail track and could be used for a double track on the space available for a conventional single track right of way.

According to the Scientific American of March 28, 1891, the steam locomotive and cars were in regular and continuous operation for passenger service during several weeks in the summer of 1890. The service was provided between the Gravesend and Coney Island areas of Brooklyn, on an abandoned section of an old standard-gauge railway track of the Sea Beach and Brighton Railroad. The first locomotive weighed nine tons, and had two 10 by 12 inches (250 by 300 mm) cylinders, the piston rods of both being connected with cranks on each side the single 6 foot driving wheel, and the front of the locomotive being also supported by two 38-inch (970 mm) pony wheels, one behind the other. These wheels had double flanges, to contact with either side of the track rail, as also had similarly arranged pairs of 38 inch wheels arranged under and housed in the floors near each end of the passenger cars.”

A heavier locomotive was especially designed for this method of traction, and built for use on a street railway. It weighed 16 tons and had a pair of 5 feet (1.5 m) drivers. The crank was only seven inches in length, and the engine was designed to readily make 600 revolutions a minute, and maintain a speed of 100 miles per hour (160 km/h) with a full train of passenger cars.

In a true line with, and fifteen feet directly above, the face of the track rail was the lower face of a guide rail, supported from posts arranged along the side of the track, and on the sides of this guide rail run pairs of rubber-faced trolley wheels attached to the top of the locomotive and the cars. The guide rail was a simple stringer of yellow pine, 4¼ by 8 inches in section, and the standards on which the wheels are journaled were placed far enough apart to allow a space of 6 inches between the continuous faces of each pair of wheels, thus affording 1¾ inches for lateral play, or sidewise movement toward or from the guard rail, it being designed that the guide rail shall be arranged in the exact line of the true center of gravity of the cars and locomotive. The standards were bolted to six-inch wide strap iron attached to and extending across the top of the car.

In addition to an ordinary track switch, in which, however, the switch bar is made to throw only one rail, a connection was made by means of a vertical rod and upper switch bar with a shifting section of the guide rail, whereby, on the moving of the track rail and the setting of the signal, the guide rail was simultaneously moved, the adjustment being effected and both being locked in position according to the methods usual in ordinary railway practice.

The passenger cars were each two stories in height, each story being divided lengthwise into nine separate compartments, each of which seated comfortably four passengers, thus providing seats for 72 passengers in each car. Each compartment had its own sliding door, and all the doors on the same floor of the car were connected by rods at the top and bottom with a lever in convenient reach of the brakeman, by whom the doors are all opened and closed simultaneously. The compartments were each four feet wide and five feet long, the seats facing each other. Only one rail of the old single track was used, as only one guide rail had been erected, except at the ends of the route, for switching purposes, but the width of the cars and motor was such that it only required the erection of another guide rail, for the utilizing of the other track rail, to form a regular double-track road of the Boynton pattern.

The section of railroad on which this system has been operated was only 2-mile (3.2 km) long, in which distance the curves were considerable, but, although they were mostly in one direction, the indications of wear upon the traction wheels, and upon the guide rail and trolley wheels, were hardly perceptible. During a portion of the season, when the summer travel to Coney Island was at its height, trains were run on regular schedule time, 50 three-car-trains daily each way, carrying up to 300 passengers per trip.

== Locomotive designs ==
At least four different locomotive designs for the Boynton Bicycle Railroad were produced but it is unclear how many were actually built.

Wheel arrangement	Driver diameter	Boilers	Service
0-1-2	8ft	1 horizontal	passenger
2-1-0	6ft	1 vertical	passenger
0-2-0	5ft	1 horizontal	passenger
0-3-3-0	?	2 vertical	freight

The freight locomotive resembles a Double Fairlie.

== See also ==
- Pelham Park and City Island Railway
- Lartigue Monorail
- Wuppertal Schwebebahn
