= Pelham Park and City Island Railway =

Short street railway in the Bronx, New York

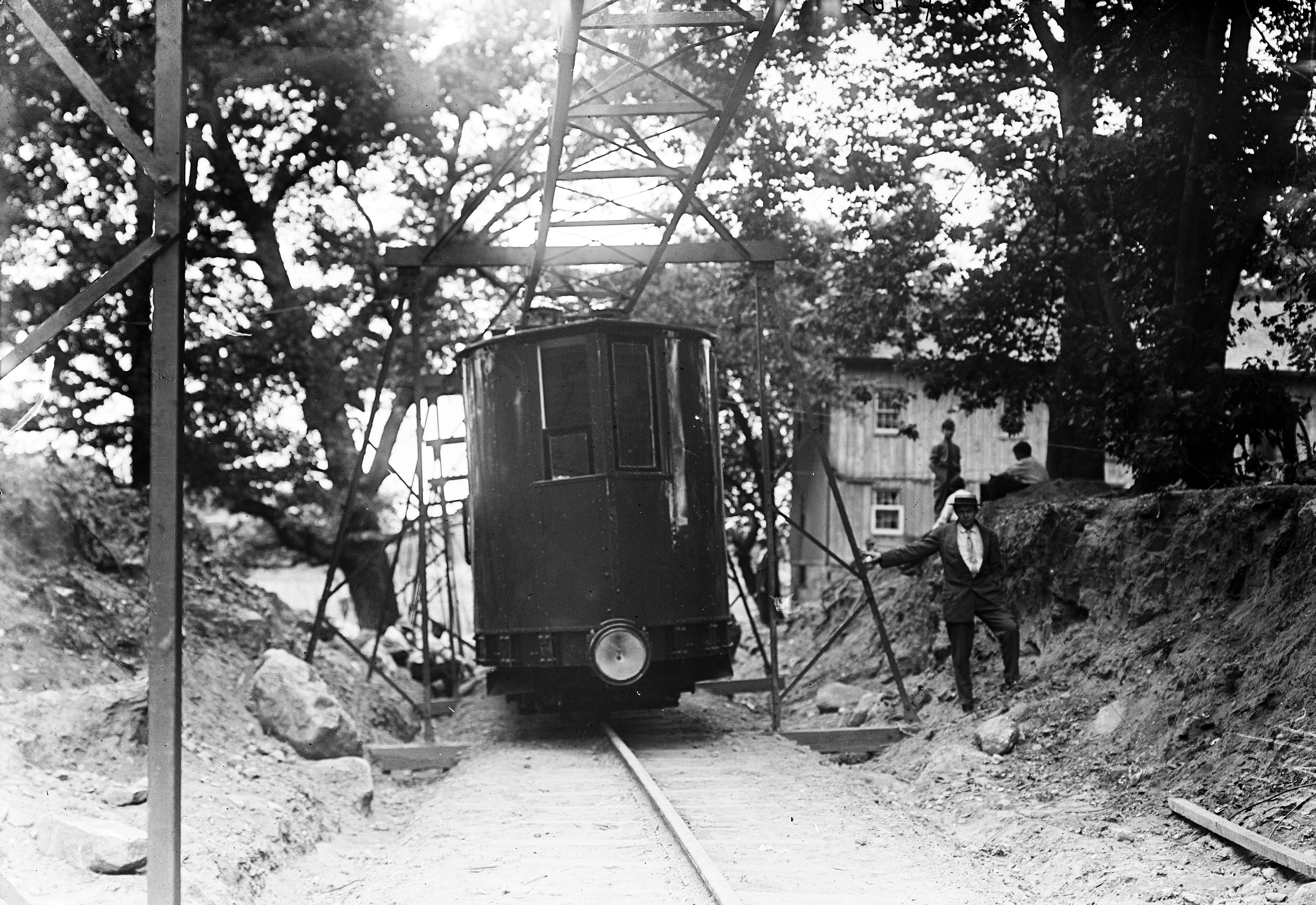
- Exterior view of City Island Railroad car, c. 1910

Overview
- Locale: the Bronx, New York City
- Dates of operation: 1884 as two companies 1913 merger–1914
- Predecessor: Pelham Park Railroad Company; City Island Railroad
- Successor: Third Avenue Railway

Technical
- Track gauge: 4 ft 8 1/2 in (1,435 mm)
- Previous gauge: 3 ft 6 in (1,067 mm) and monorail

The Pelham Park and City Island Railway was a short street railway in the Bronx, New York City, which connected City Island with the Bartow station of the Harlem River and Port Chester Railroad on the mainland. The line existed from 1884 to 1919, most of that time as a horse-drawn system. The mainland portion was converted to an electrically-driven monorail in 1910, unique in the country at the time, nicknamed The Flying Lady. Prior to the railway, a stagecoach operated between City Island and Mount Vernon.

The railroad experienced two serious accidents, one during the horse-drawn era, and the second on the inaugural day of monorail service. The line was never a commercial success and eventually ceased operation when the company went bankrupt.

== Early services ==
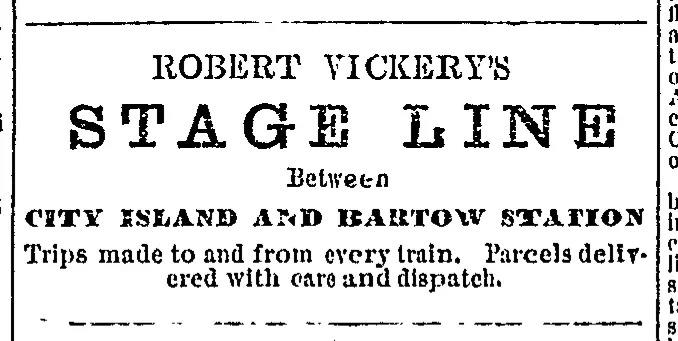
Advertisement in the Mount Vernon Chronicle, May 25, 1877

Before the first bridge to City Island was built, the only way to reach the island was via a ferry pulled by a rope. In 1868, a bridge was built using timber salvaged from the USS North Carolina which had been scrapped in David Carl's shipyard on City Island the previous year.

Prior to the building of Bartow Station, a stagecoach service operated by Robert Vickery ran between Mount Vernon and City Island. This ran until 1887. Another stagecoach service was operated by two brothers who ran a grocery store on the island; the stagecoach was used to make deliveries to local residents.

== Horse drawn railway ==
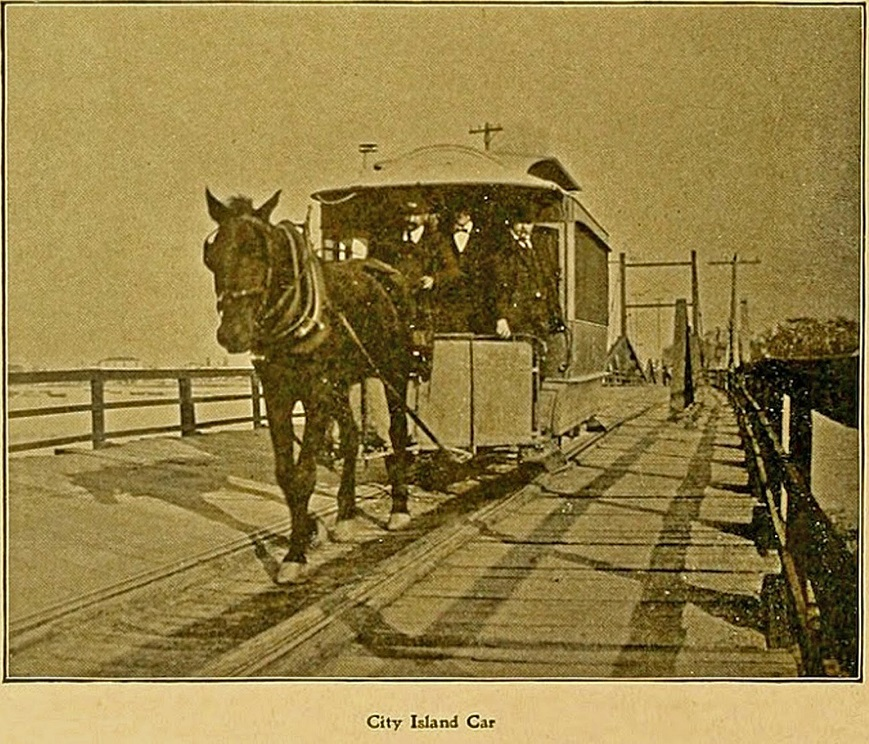
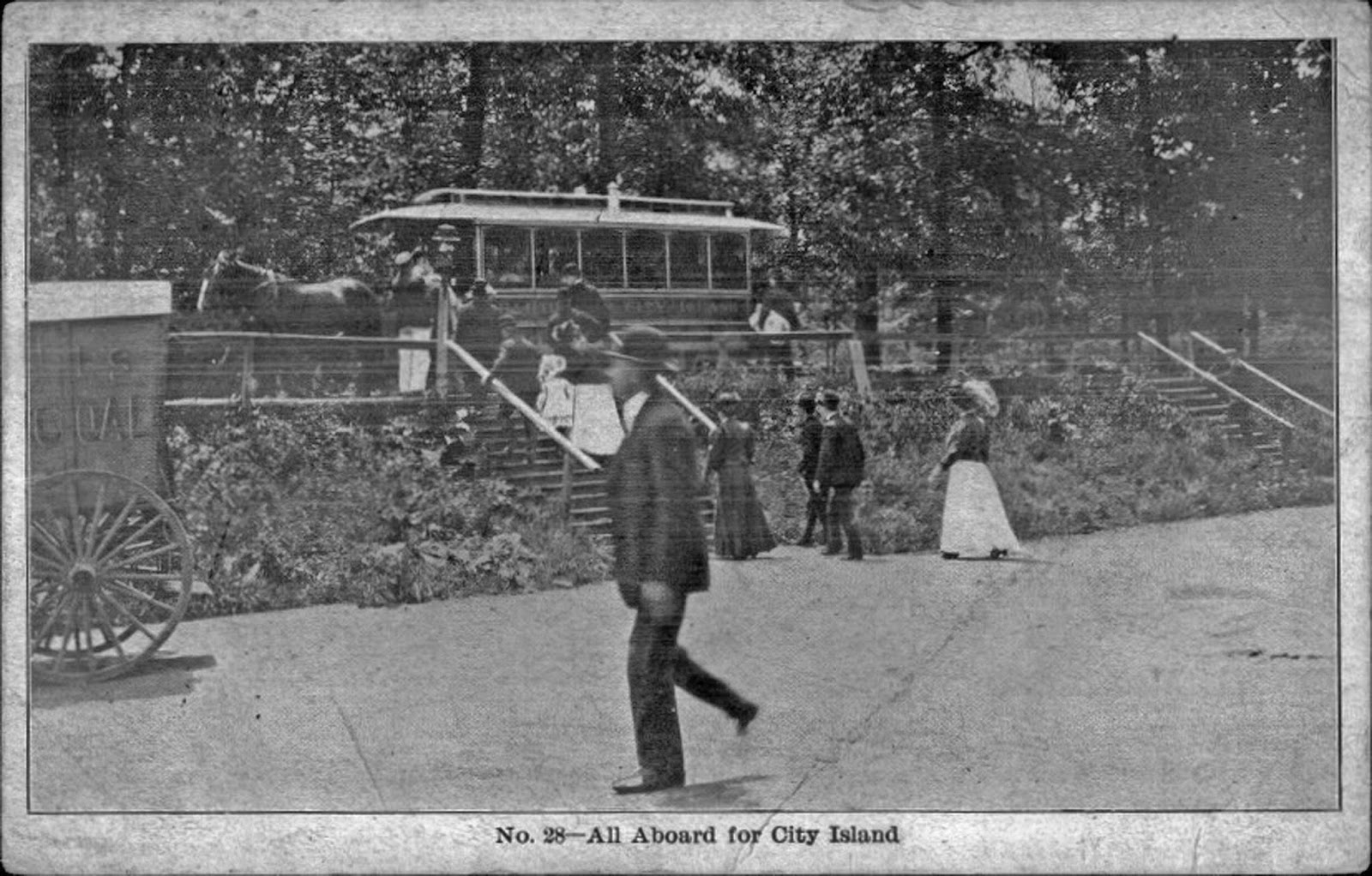
Two views of horse-drawn carriages on the Pelham Park Railroad

The line was incorporated as two companies on August 30, 1884; the Pelham Park Railroad Company and the City Island Railroad. The two would connect end to end at Marshall's Corner on Rodman's Neck, just short of the bridge to City Island. At the time the territory to be traversed lay entirely within the Town of Pelham in Westchester County. The Pelham Park Railroad Company, with Samuel McMillan as president, was designated as the operator of the system. The 3 ft 6 in (1,067 mm) narrow gauge track was constructed of 30 lb rail and was equipped with 16 horses, 9 horse cars, and 2 freight cars. The line opened from the Cass Gilbert-designed Bartow station to Marshall's Corner on May 20, 1887. Five days later operations were extended across the bridge to City Island and along City Island Avenue to Brown's Hotel. By 1892 the line had reached Belden's Point, its final terminal. The length of the combined system was 3.2 miles (5.1 km).

On April 8, 1889, an accident occurred. Several hundred passengers had taken the Harlem River Branch Railroad to Bartow station, where they transferred to horse-drawn cars for the trip to City Island; six passenger cars were augmented by two horse-drawn flatbed freight cars, on which 50–60 of the passengers were conveyed, many of them standing. The lead car overturned on a sharp curve approaching the City Island Bridge, resulting in many injuries, some of them severe. There were reports that the driver was intoxicated; officials of the railroad denied that, but stated that he might have been guilty of reckless driving.

In 1895, New York City annexed what is now the East Bronx, including the area through which the horsecars ran. The same year, City Island resident Richard S. Williams filed a complaint with the Board of State Railroad Commissioners that the two companies were unlawfully double-charging passengers. Mr. Williams contends that as the two companies were "practically one railroad line", they should be charging a single 5-cent fare, instead of the 5 cents being individually charged by each.

In 1897, the Pelham Park Railroad Company applied for a franchise to operate a railroad line through Pelham Bay Park, along Shore Road, and across the Pelham Bridge. The line would connect New Rochelle in Westchester County, New York, to the Bronx's existing trolley network, which included lines to Harlem in Manhattan. Residents of the surrounding area opposed the franchise because a new rail line on that route would require tearing up Shore Road's pavement. On November 30, 1897, the New York City Board of Aldermen voted to grant a 25-year franchise on a vote of 25 to 3. The granting of the franchise did not necessarily entitle the railroad to operate the line later. New York City's mayor at the time, William L. Strong, indicated he would veto the franchise. On December 8, the New York Supreme Court placed an injunction to prevent the franchise from being sold to the Pelham Bay Railroad.

On March 14, 1902 (two years before it began operating the first line of the New York City Subway), the Interborough Rapid Transit Company (IRT) took control of the two companies. August Belmont Jr., the IRT's operator, had paid $32,000 for the City Island Railroad, which the IRT then acquired for $4.5 million. The City Island Railroad was to be expanded to the planned New York and Port Chester Railroad, as well as the then-under-construction IRT subway line. As such, the Crawford Real Estate and Building Company sold some land in 1902 for an expansion of the City Island Railroad.

A mortgage was recorded in December 1902 for $27,750 (equivalent to $960,000 in 2025) for a 1-year term.

== Monorail ==
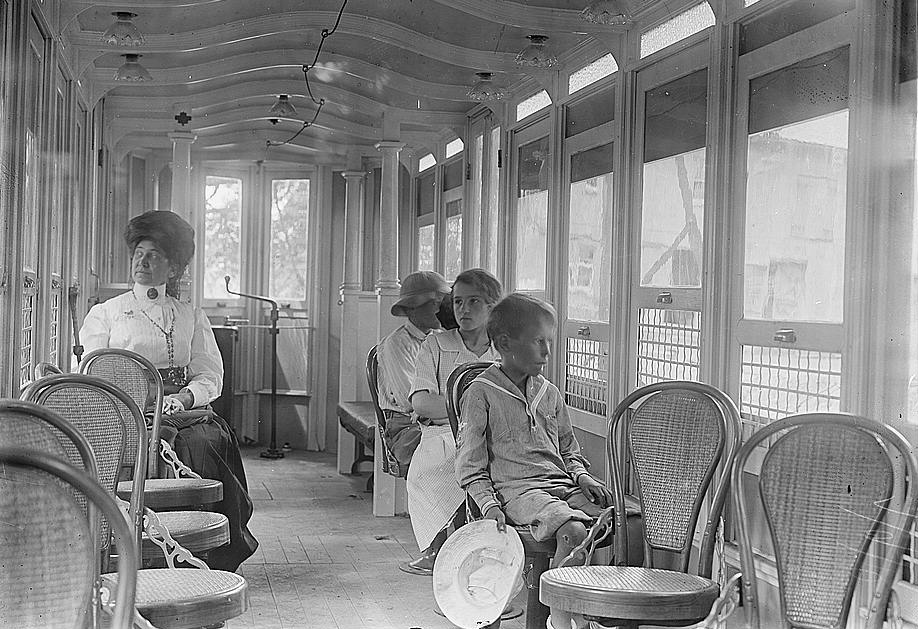
Interior view of car, c. 1910

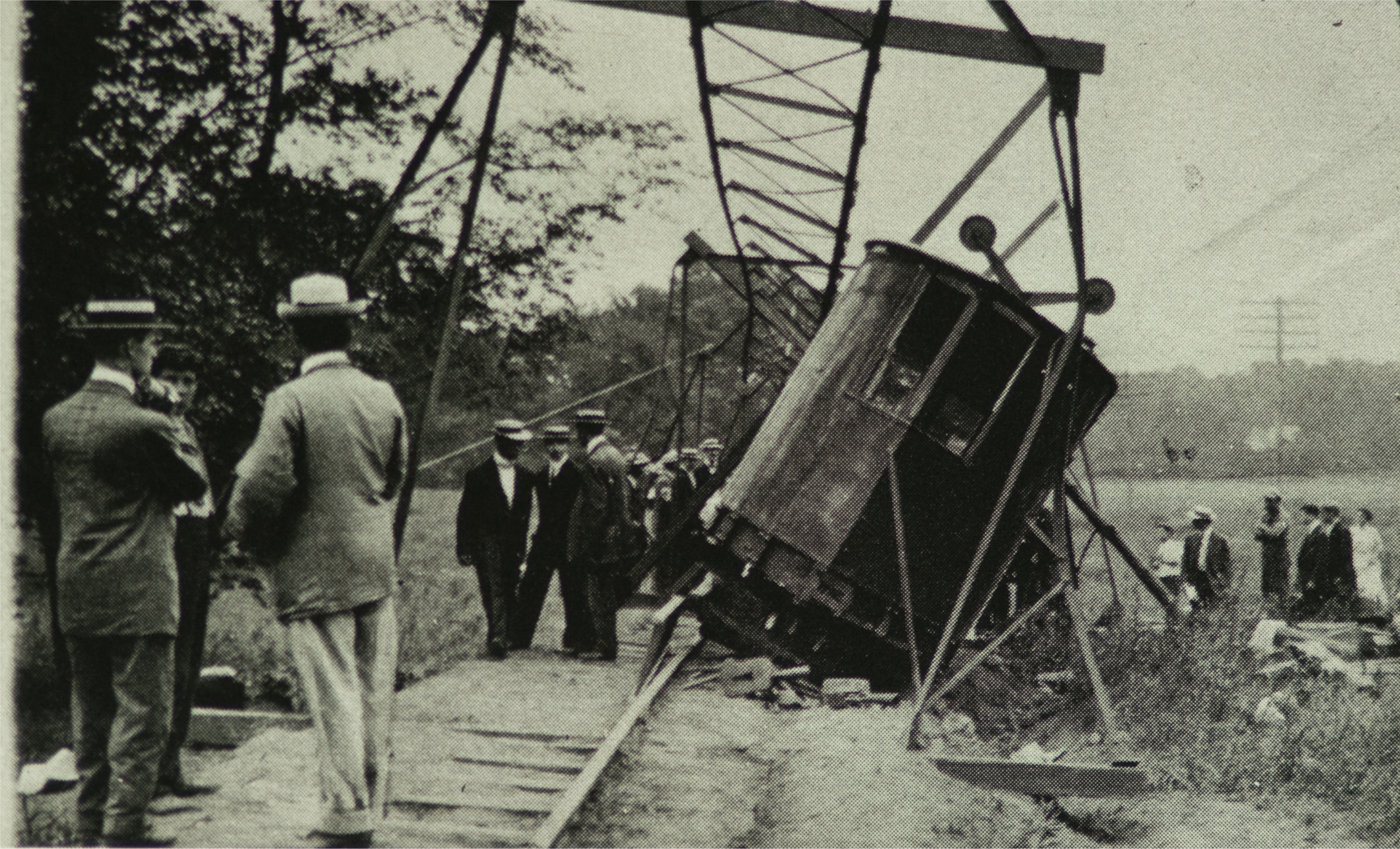
The Flying Lady derailment, 1910

US Patent 690539

An experimental operation of a monorail by Howard Hansel Tunis at Virginia's Jamestown Exposition of 1907 impressed the management of the Pelham Park Railroad, which sought permission for its own construction with support from his Monoroad Construction Company. The proposed cars were 50 feet (15 m) long by 6.5 feet (2.0 m) wide, with pointed ends. The plans called for a car which was supported by 4 double-flanged wheels riding on a single rail, with two 4-wheeled trucks on top of the car engaging with an overhead guide rail. John H. Starin predicted that the cars would be capable of 80–100 miles per hour (130–160 km/h). The trip from Bartow Station to City Island would take 3 to 5 minutes, compared to the 40 minute trip by the horse-drawn car.

City Island residents had complained about the horse-drawn service, and one newspaper reported that "the cars were off the rails almost as much as they were on them". In October 1908, application was made to the New York State Public Service Commission to change the motive power of the railroad from horse to overhead electric current. A hearing was held on November 6 and final approval issued on November 17. The route was described as:

Beginning at or near Bartow Station on the Harlem River and Portchester Railroad; then to along and through the street known as Third street to the highway known as the Shore road; thence along and across the said Shore road to the highway known as the City Island road; then through, along, and upon the said City Island road to a junction with the City Island Railroad at or near Marshall's Corner.

It was the first commercial monorail in the city, and the only in the United States at the time. After its brief run from 1910–1914, it was a half-century before the city saw another, the temporary exhibition of the AMF Monorail at the 1964 New York World's Fair.

=== Operating history ===
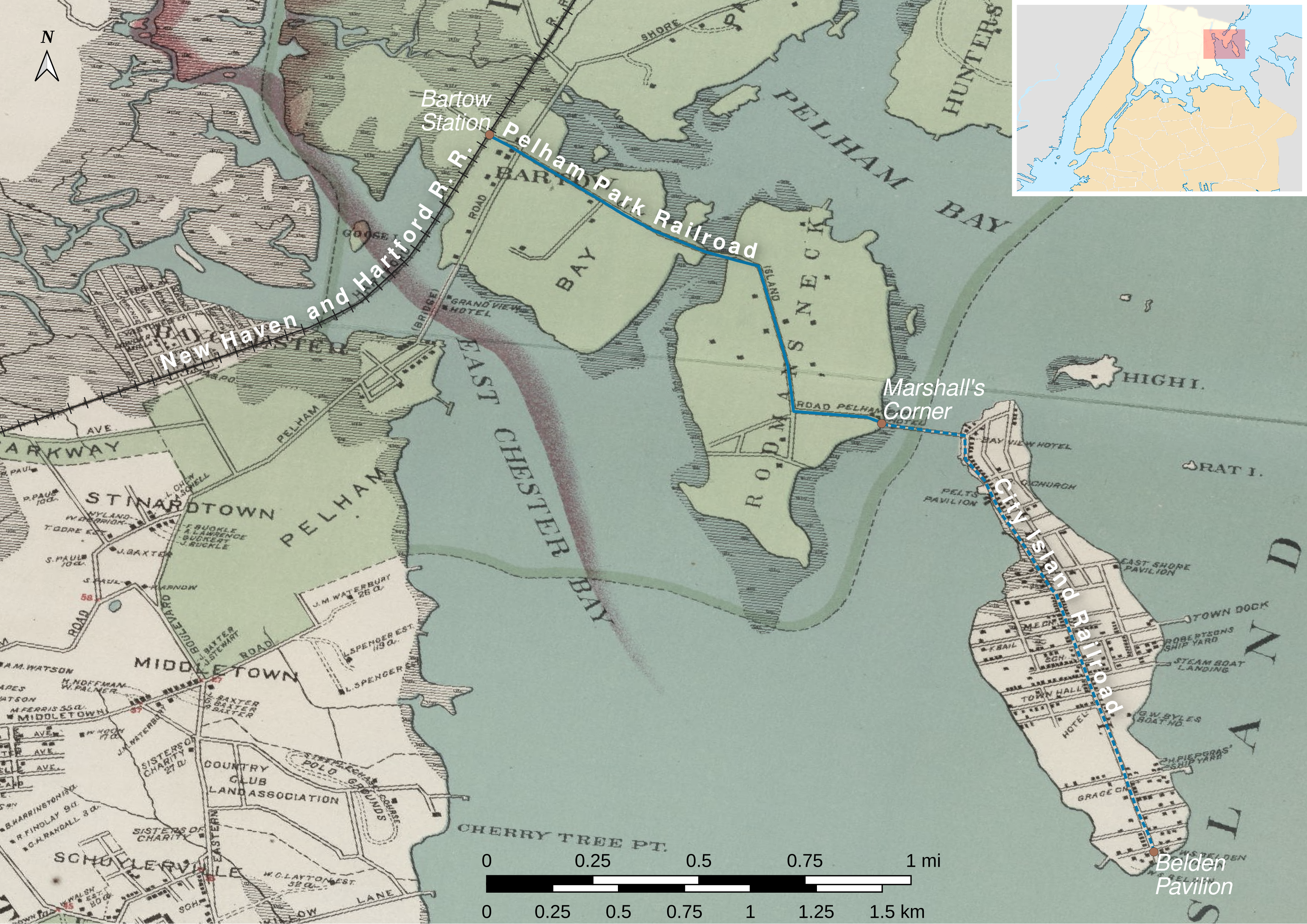
Route of Pelham Park and City Island Railroads shown on a contemporary (1893) map.

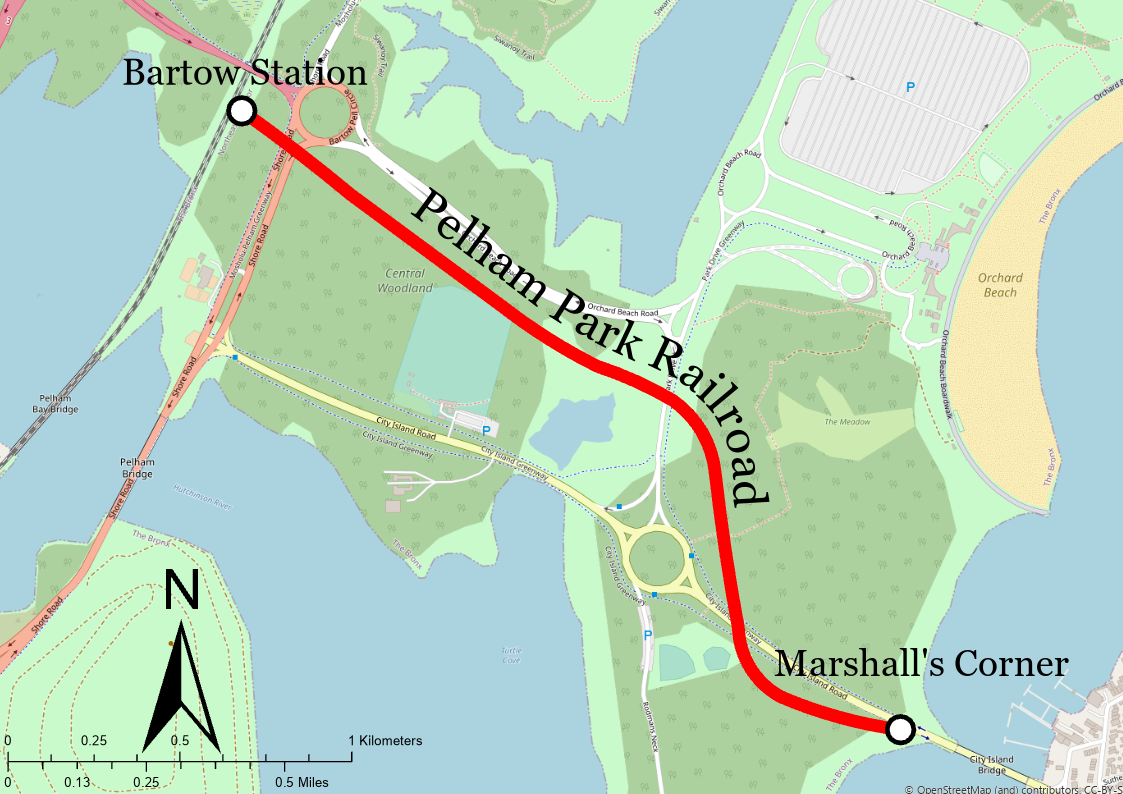
Detail of the route of Pelham Park Railroad on a modern map. Shoreline and road locations are significantly different from what they were at the time the railroad was built.

The monorail plans were prepared by January 1909. The service between the Bartow station and Marshall's Corner opened for regular service in mid-July 1910 (variously reported as the 16th or 17th), although it unofficially began carrying passengers two days earlier. Service was provided by a single car, nicknamed The Flying Lady, capable of reaching 50–60 miles per hour (80–97 km/h). Although previously proposed to be 50 feet (15 m), it was later reported to be 75 feet (23 m) long, and variously described as yellow or orange in color. Electric power was supplied by two overhead rails, which also served to stabilize the car.

The car toppled over on its maiden voyage while rounding a curve with 100 passengers aboard, more than twice the normal capacity of 40 people. A number of passengers were injured, one seriously. Howard Tunis, who was operating the vehicle, received a broken rib, and his 6 year old daughter Eugenia suffered bruises.

Tunis blamed the accident on "cheaply built" roadbed; it was supported by loose dirt which was unable to support the weight of the car, causing the track to sink several inches. This resulted in a loss of contact with the upper rails on the third curve of the route. The accident was within sight of the line's power house, allowing an engineer to cut the electrical power as soon as the derailment happened.

Operation was immediately suspended with service restored on November 14, 1910. The monorail was not a financial success and the IRT forced the companies into bankruptcy on December 4, 1911. The monorail on the line's western end and the narrow gauge horsecar line on the eastern end continued to operate until 1914.

== Conversion to standard gauge ==
In 1913, the IRT decided to convert the line to a 4 ft 8 1/2 in (1,435 mm) standard gauge electric trolley system and with this in mind, merged the two companies into a new entity, the Pelham Park and City Island Railroad, which took over operation on July 1, 1913. The trackage across the bridge and on City Island was converted to standard gauge, with leased New York Railways horsecars taking over the service. The monorail ceased operation on April 3, 1914, with service temporarily operated by a leased bus from Fifth Avenue Coach Lines.

On July 9, 1914, the IRT sold the company to the Third Avenue Railway. After taking control on August 1, 1914, the Third Avenue quickly completed construction of the standard gauge railway, but did not install overhead wire. The last horsecar in the Bronx completed its run on August 18, 1914. The first storage battery car began operation from Bartow to the line's end on City Island at 12:30 p.m. that same day.

== Termination of service ==
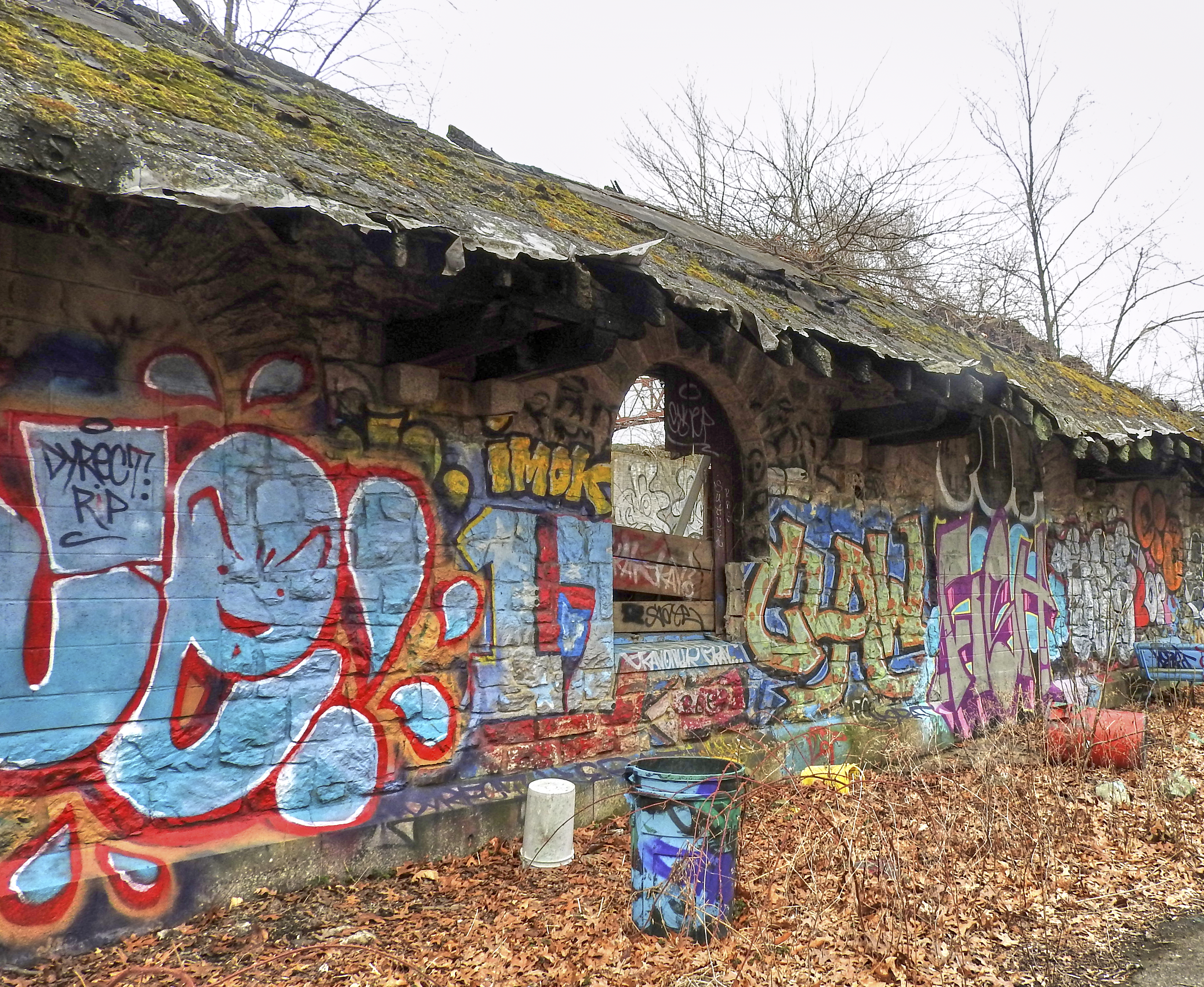
Bartow Station in 2022.

In 1919, the Third Avenue Railway petitioned the New York Public Service Commission to permit abandonment, on the grounds of insufficient funds to continue operation; the PSC granted the permission. Operation ceased on August 9, 1919. On August 11, New York City mayor John Francis Hylan also wrote to the commission, noting that the railway had been losing almost $18,000 (equivalent to $330,000 in 2025) per year and that he was opposed to continuing to run the railroad as a municipally owned service. Hylan suggested that the equipment be sold to "people who deal in second-hand railroad scrap, who are commonly called junk dealers".

As of 2022, Bartow Station is abandoned, and in extremely poor condition. The roof is partially missing, the building is overgrown with trees which have damaged the structure, and the walls are covered in graffiti.

== See also ==
- Boynton Bicycle Railroad
- 1881 map of the area
- 1893 map of the area
