= Co-op City station =

Planned rail station in the Bronx, New York

Co-op City
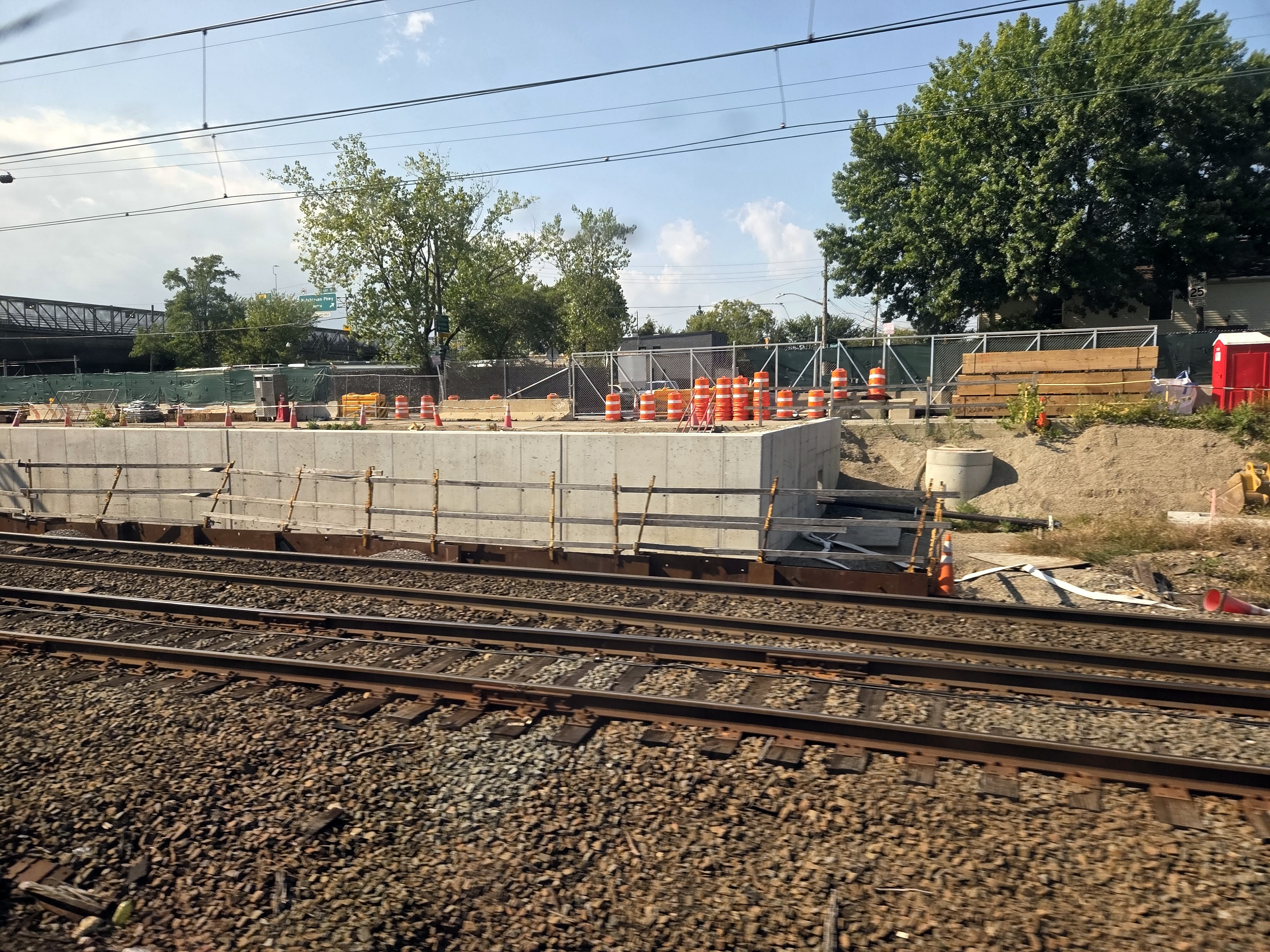
- The station under construction in September 2025

General information
- Location: Erskine Place and De Reimer Avenue; Co-op City, The Bronx, New York
- Coordinates: 40.8593°N 73.8268°W
- Owner: Metropolitan Transportation Authority
- Line: Hell Gate Line (Northeast Corridor)
- Platforms: 1 island platform
- Tracks: 4

Construction
- Accessible: Yes

History
- Opening: 2027 (planned)

Proposed services
Preceding station	Metro-North Railroad	Following station
Morris Park toward Penn Station	New Haven Line	New Rochelle toward Stamford
Former services
Preceding station	New York, New Haven and Hartford Railroad	Following station
Westchester toward New York Harlem River	Harlem River Branch	Bartow toward New Rochelle
Location

Co-op City station is a planned passenger rail station on the Metro-North Railroad's New Haven Line, to be located in the Co-op City neighborhood of the Bronx in New York City. The station is planned to open in 2027 as part of the Penn Station Access project. The station will be located under Interstate 95 along the southern edge of Co-op City, with two entrances on the north side of the tracks.

== History ==
The Baychester station of the New Haven Railroad was located at the same site. A new station building was designed by Cass Gilbert around 1908, but never built.

A 63-month design-build contract for the project was issued in December 2021.
