= Harlem River and Port Chester Railroad =

Railroad branch in New York

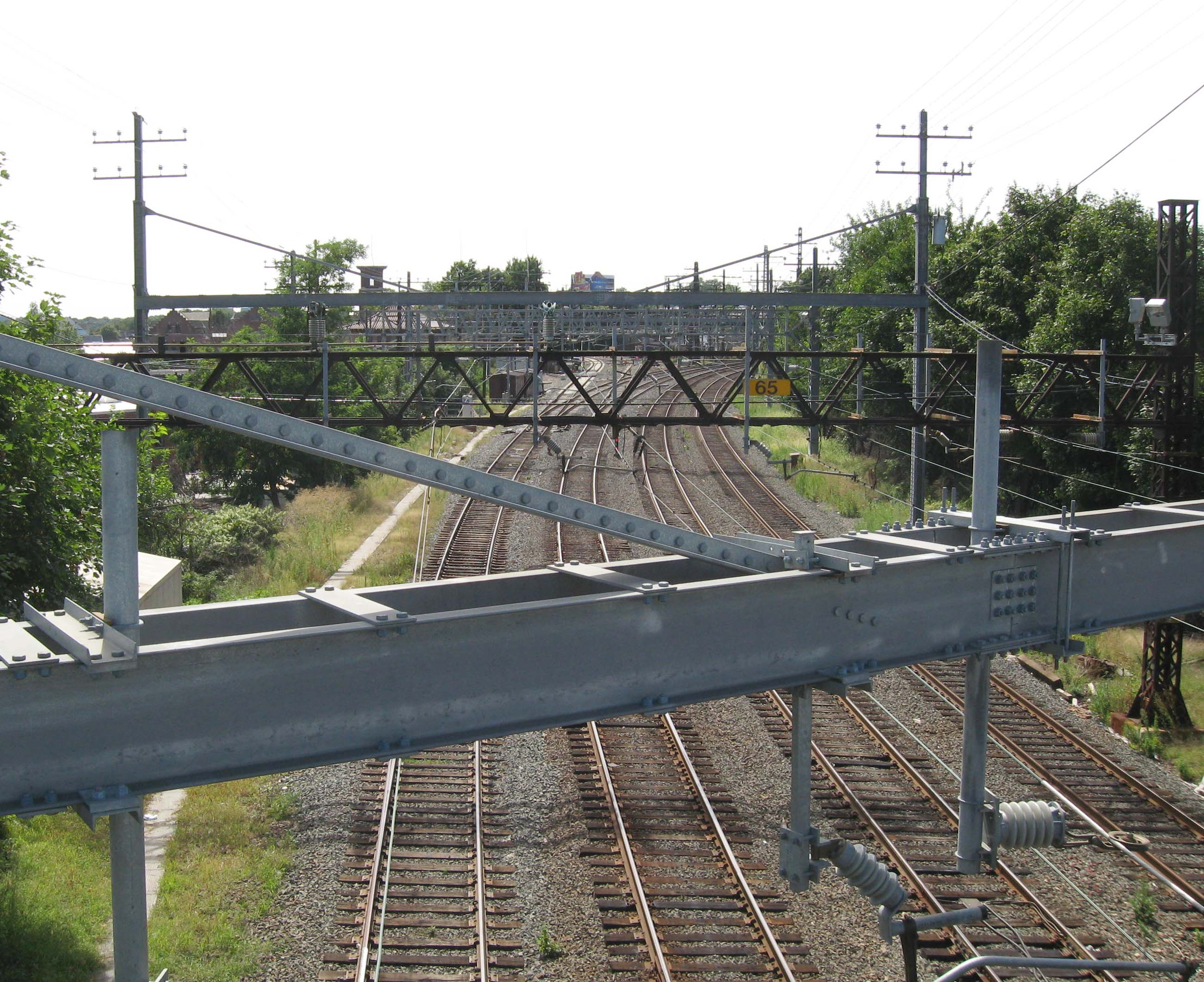

Overview
- Locale: New Rochelle, New York to Bronx County, New York City
- Dates of operation: 1873–1927
- Successor: NYNH&H

Technical
- Track gauge: 4 ft 8 1/2 in (1,435 mm) standard gauge

The Harlem River and Port Chester Railroad (HR&PC) was chartered in 1866 as a branch line railroad between New York City and Port Chester, New York. The line opened in 1873 as part of the New York, New Haven and Hartford Railroad and served in various capacities until 1971. The HR&PC is now part of the Hell Gate Line section of Amtrak's high-speed Northeast Corridor.

== History ==
=== Early history ===
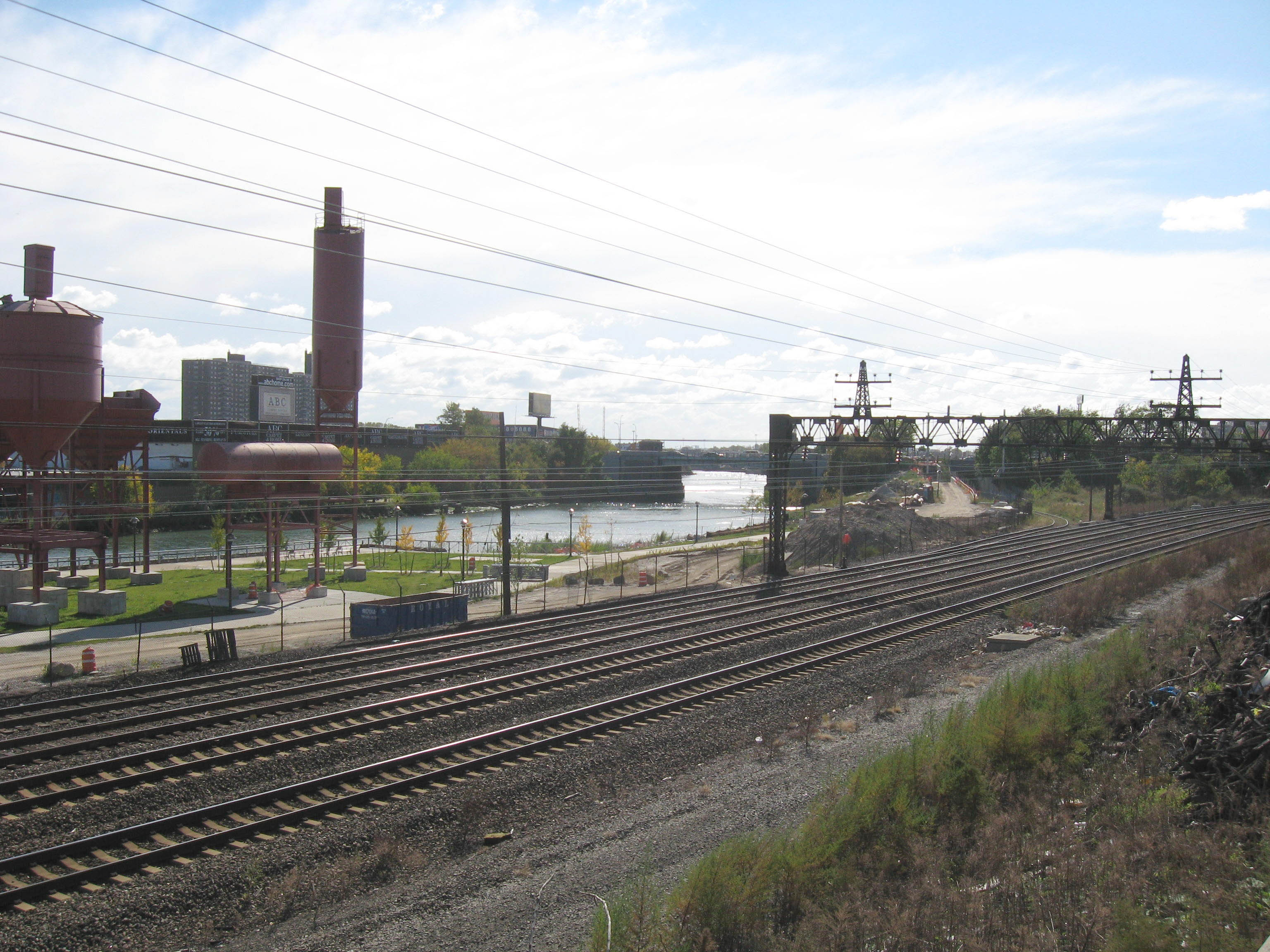
Tracks along the Bronx River, south of Westchester Avenue

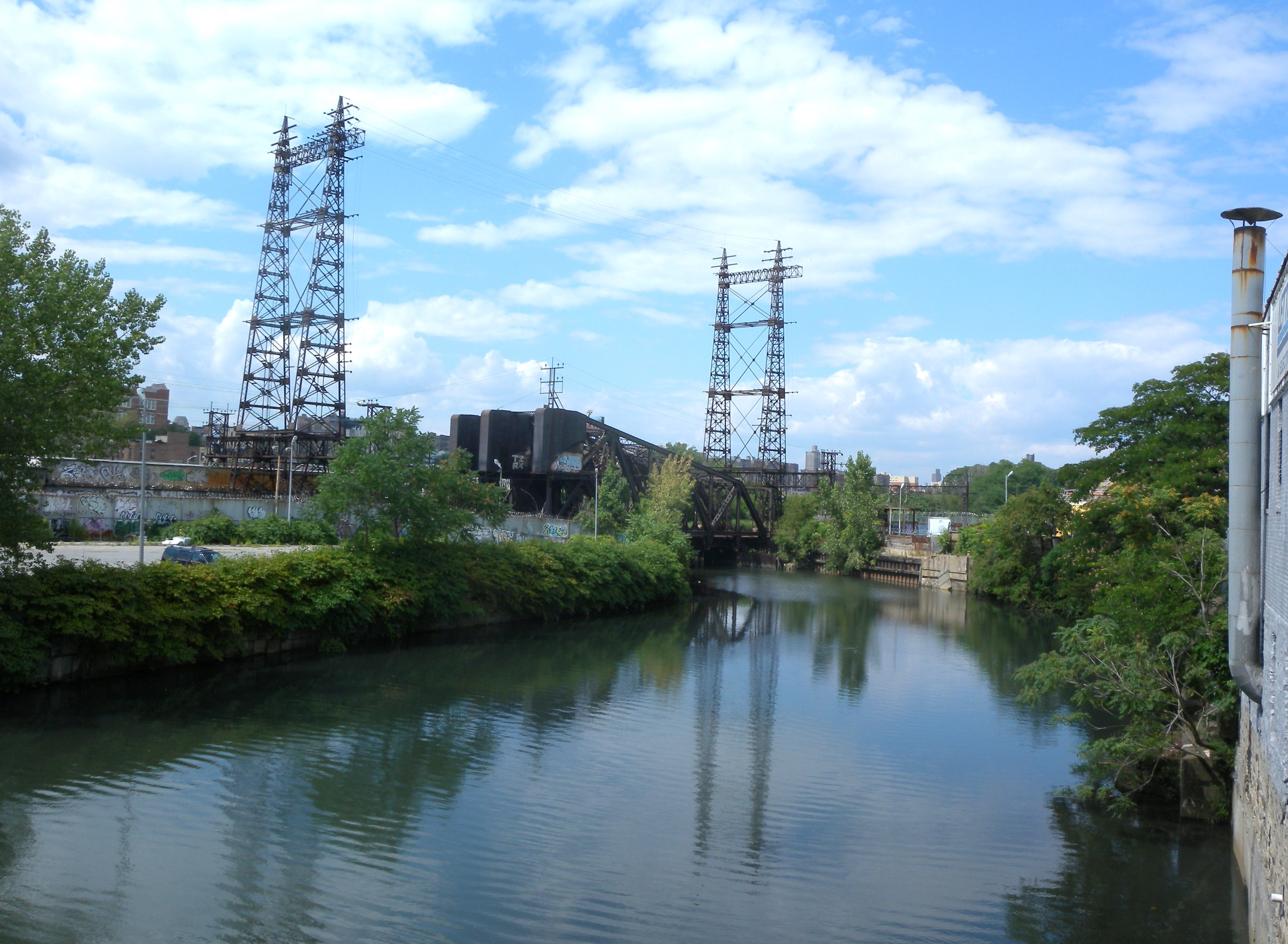
Bronx River crossing

The Harlem River and Port Chester Railroad was chartered April 23, 1866 as a branch line from the Harlem River at the north end of the Harlem Bridge (now the Third Avenue Bridge) in New York City to the Village of Port Chester in Westchester County, New York at the Connecticut state border. Only the southern portion was completed, terminating instead about five towns southwest of Port Chester in New Rochelle. At the time, New Rochelle was the final railroad station when traveling from Connecticut before entering New York City.

The New York and New Haven Railroad and the Hartford and New Haven Railroad merged to create the larger New York, New Haven and Hartford Railroad in 1872. The HR&PC was leased by the New Haven Railroad in 1873 and opened later that year, running from the New Haven at New Rochelle south into the Bronx. Leasing the line enabled the New Haven to establish a continuous line of service from Connecticut to Manhattan. The HR&PC provided freight service between New York City and the Harlem River Yard. Commuter service ran along the line from the Harlem River Terminal up to the New Haven main line in New Rochelle until 1931.

The New York, Westchester and Boston Railway commuter rail line opened in 1912, paralleling the HR&PC just to the west, south of the crossing of the Bronx River. Until 1924, when a new combined station was built, the short Willis Avenue Spur of the elevated IRT Third Avenue Line ran to the Harlem River terminal of the HR&PC and the NYW&B.

In 1917 the New York Connecting Railroad opened for passenger service between the HR&PC at Port Morris and the Pennsylvania Tunnel and Terminal Railroad at Sunnyside Yard. This allowed NYNH&H trains to run over the HR&PC and into New York Penn Station, though most continued to serve Grand Central Terminal until Amtrak took over intercity operations in 1971.

=== Later years ===
On January 1, 1927 the HR&PC was merged into the New York, New Haven and Hartford Railroad. It became the Harlem River Branch. The NYNH&H was merged into Penn Central in 1969, and Penn Central became part of Conrail in 1976. The HR&PC was ultimately sold to Amtrak and is now part of their Northeast Corridor used by its high-speed Acela.

== Station listing ==
Locality	Milepost	Station	Lat/long	Notes/Connections
The Bronx	0.0	Harlem River Terminal / Willis Avenue		Also connected to IRT spur and NYW&B
The Bronx	NYCR joins HR&PC from Hell Gate Bridge			
The Bronx	0.9	Port Morris		Also connected to NYW&B
The Bronx	1.9	Casanova		Also connected to NYW&B
The Bronx	2.6	Hunts Point		Also connected to NYW&B. Today a retail block
The Bronx	3.2	Westchester Avenue		Also connected to NYW&B
The Bronx	3.9	West Farms		
The Bronx	4.8	Van Nest		
The Bronx	5.4	Morris Park		
The Bronx	5.8	Westchester		
The Bronx	7.2	Baychester		
The Bronx	8.2	City Island		Also called Bartow station
Westchester	9.8	Pelham Manor		
Westchester	10.8	Woodside		
Westchester	HR&PC joins NYNH&H Main Line			
Westchester	11.5	New Rochelle		
Acquired by New York, New Haven and Hartford Railroad in 1927

== See also ==
- New Haven Line
- Oak Point Yard
- List of New York, New Haven and Hartford Railroad precursors

== Sources ==
- PRR Chronology
