= New Rochelle station =

Train station in New York

New Rochelle
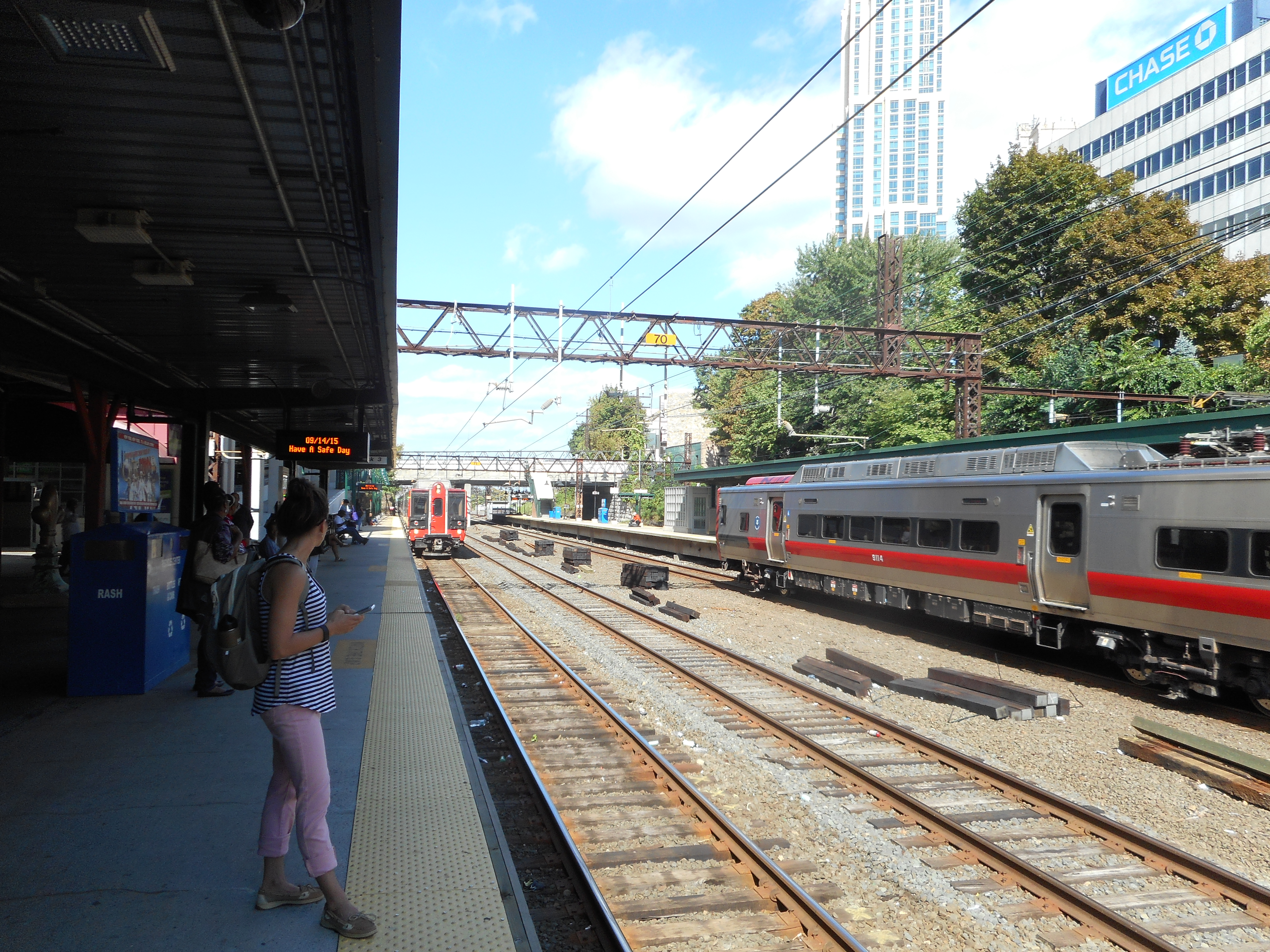
- Two trains at New Rochelle station in September 2015

General information
- Location: 1 Railroad Plaza; New Rochelle, New York; United States
- Coordinates: 40°54′44.34″N 73°47′5.77″W
- Owner: Metropolitan Transportation Authority
- Line: MTA New Haven Line (Northeast Corridor)
- Platforms: 1 side platform and 1 island platform
- Tracks: 4
- Connections: Bee-Line Bus System (see New Rochelle Transit Center below)

Construction
- Platform levels: 2
- Parking: 1,585 spaces
- Accessible: Yes

Other information
- Station code: Amtrak: NRO
- Fare zone: 12 (Metro-North)

History
- Opened: December 25, 1848
- Rebuilt: 1887, 1991

Passengers
- FY 2025: 155,000 (Amtrak)
- 2006: 1.045 million 0% (Metro-North)
- 2018: 6,112 daily boardings

Services
Preceding station	Amtrak	Following station
New York toward Norfolk, Newport News or Roanoke	Northeast Regional	Stamford toward Boston South or Springfield
Acela does not stop here
Vermonter does not stop here
Preceding station	Metro-North Railroad	Following station
Pelham toward Grand Central	New Haven Line	Larchmont toward Stamford
Former services
Preceding station	New York, New Haven and Hartford Railroad	Following station
Pelham toward New York	Main Line	Larchmont Manor toward New Haven
Woodside toward New York Harlem River	Harlem River Branch	Terminus
Future services
Preceding station	Metro-North Railroad	Following station
Co-op City toward Penn Station	New Haven Line	Larchmont toward Stamford
- New Rochelle Railroad Station
- U.S. National Register of Historic Places
- New York State Register of Historic Places
- Location: Between North Avenue and Memorial Highway; New Rochelle, New York, USA
- Built: 1887
- Architectural style: Late Victorian
- NRHP reference No.: 09000837
- NYSRHP No.: 11942.000010

Significant dates
- Added to NRHP: October 14, 2009
- Designated NYSRHP: August 28, 2009
Location

New Rochelle station is a Metro-North Railroad and Amtrak train station located in New Rochelle, New York. The station serves Metro-North's New Haven Line and Amtrak's Northeast Regional; Bee-Line Bus System buses serve a bus stop just outside the station. As of August 2006, weekday commuter ridership was 4,020, and there are 1,381 parking spots. It is the busiest New Haven Line station in Westchester County.

On October 14, 2009, it was listed on the National Register of Historic Places. The NRHP listing is limited to the historic station building and just the land underneath its roofline, as the pedestrian bridge elevators, track and other associated structure is all much newer and lack historical merit. The building was built in 1887 for the New York, New Haven, and Hartford Railroad. The architect of the building is unknown; it was built by George O. Hawes, a local builder. The building was remodeled in 1931.

== History ==
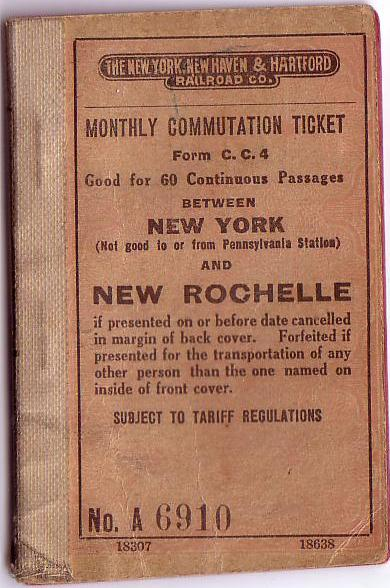
Early New Rochelle ticket book

On December 25, 1848 the first train steamed through New Rochelle, part of the New York and New Haven Railroad built in the early 1840s. At the time, New Rochelle was the final railroad station before entering New York City. A fatal head-on collision in New Rochelle in 1851 led to the construction of a second track in 1853. By 1869, six trains traveled between the two cities daily. NY&NH was consolidated into the New York, New Haven & Hartford Railroad a year later. In 1873, the railroad acquired the Harlem River and Port Chester Railroad and linked it to the station. In 1884, the railroad drew up plans for its present brick structure which was constructed in 1887 to replace the original Gothic Revival structure that had stood just northeast of what is now North Avenue.

The 1½ story station is built of brick and has a gabled roof punctuated by a series of hipped dormers. A centered hexagonal dormer projects away from the building to allow views along the tracks. Its eaves overhang beyond the exterior walls of the building, and is supported by unadorned wood brackets. The interior of the 3,670 square feet (341 m^{2}) still retains many original features. By the start of the 20th century, the New York, New Haven & Hartford Railroad had five tracks through New Rochelle. The population had surged to 15,000 inhabitants. A roundhouse for steam engines, tracks for passenger cars and a large freightyard near Cedar Street was built.

Over the years, New Rochelle became one of the busiest stations on the line. As it developed into a commuter town, local travel increased even more. The city obtained national fame in 1906 when George M. Cohan wrote the song entitled "Forty-five Minutes from Broadway". The average 36-minute train ride and 10-minute walk from Grand Central to Broadway places the station about 45 minutes away.

As with all New Haven Line stations in Westchester County, the station became a Penn Central station upon acquisition by Penn Central in 1969, and eventually became part of the MTA's Metro-North Railroad. On October 25, 1987, New Rochelle became eastern Westchester County's Amtrak station, replacing Rye, which served as the county's eastern Amtrak station since 1972. The station was fully renovated in 1990, and careful attention was placed on restoring it to its original historical accuracy. The waiting room is reflective of New Haven line stations, with plaster walls, a wood ceiling and wood wainscot sheathing. The original floor was probably wood, but was replaced sometime in the 1930s with Terrazzo. There are wood moldings around the doors, and crown moldings enhance the perimeter at the ceiling line.

During 2021, a limited number of Acela trains stopped at New Rochelle station on weekends.

== Intermodal Transportation Center ==
An increase in Metro-North and Amtrak ridership late in the 20th century caused a demand for additional parking. In 1994, the city launched a plan to create a transportation center, including a parking structure with bus and taxi connections. The parking garage has a capacity in excess of 900 cars, which is two and a half times the on-site parking capacity prior to its construction. On the ground level of the structure is a bus terminal, complete with a waiting area and ticket office. The center was designed to be home to long-distance bus carriers such as the Trailways Transportation System, however they have since moved out of the Center, back to a stop two blocks away on Main Street. Routes on the Westchester Bee-Line are still served here. Several taxi companies operate from the structure, and Connecticut Limousine provides service to regional airports. The center was completed in 2001. The old station and the new transportation center have been blended together to meet the needs of the growing commuter population while at the same time preserving historical and architectural integrity of the 1887 station house.

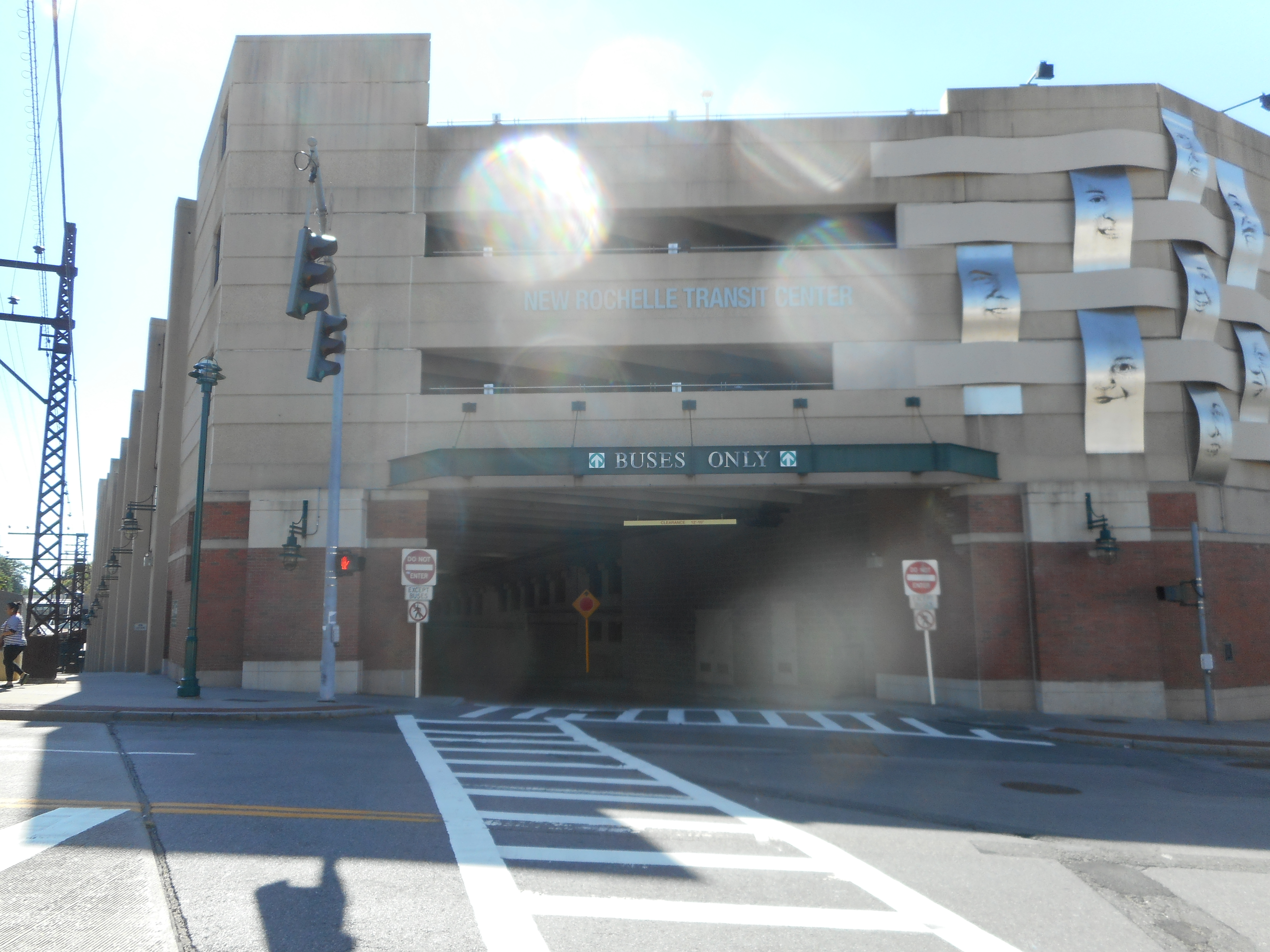
Bus entrance from North Avenue

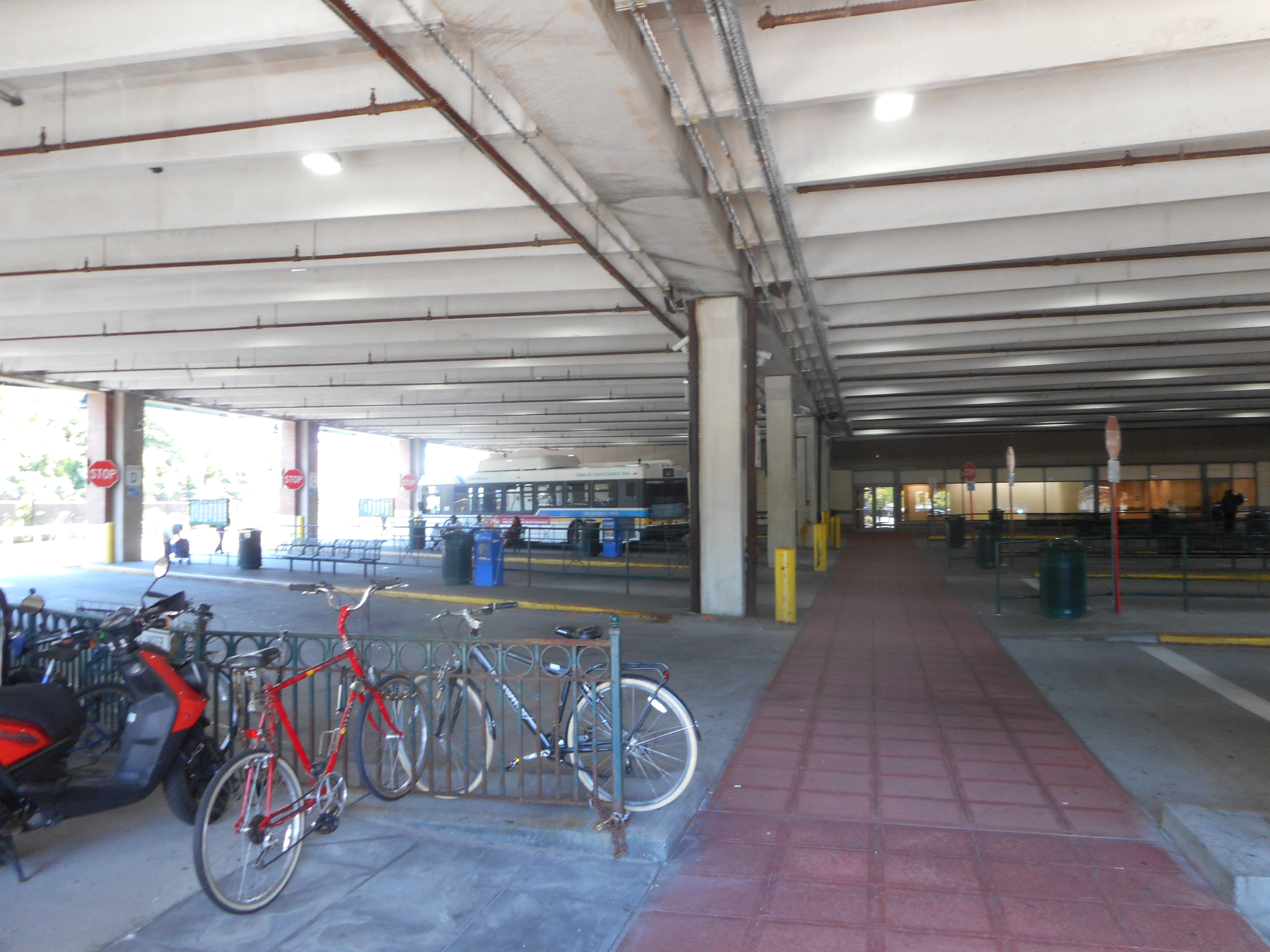
Bicycles and buses at the station.

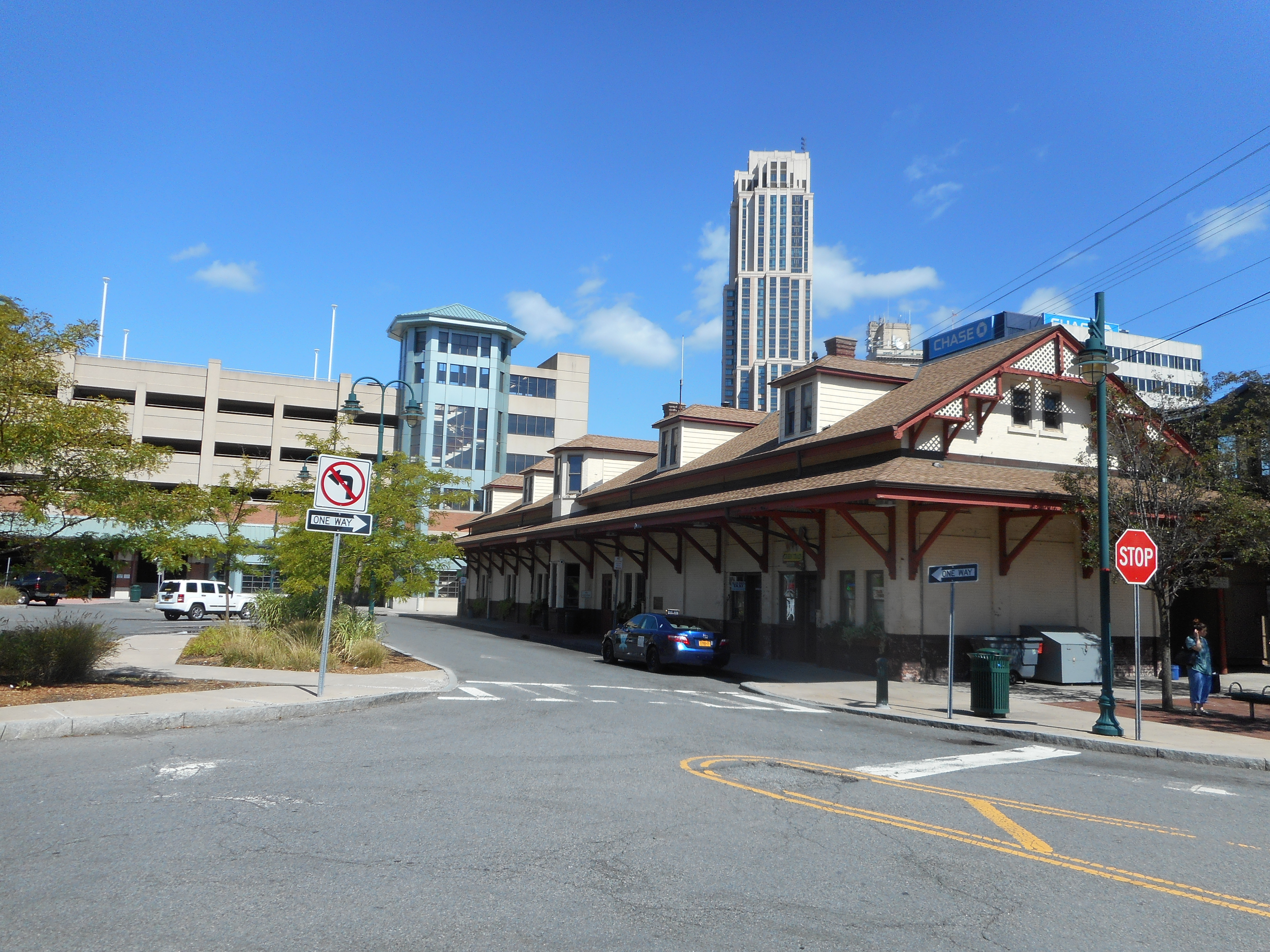
The intermodal center in the background of the old New Haven station house.

== Station layout ==
The station has two high-level platforms. The north one is a nine-car-long side platform and the south one is an 8-car long island platform.

=== Bus list ===
The following bus routes serve the New Rochelle Transit Center area; the 60 local buses stop on Main Street and Church Street eastbound, and Huguenot Street and North Street westbound, south of the station.

Route	Stop location	Terminal(s)		Via	Notes
Bee-Line Bus
7	Platform C	to Yonkers; Getty Square; Riverdale Avenue		Yonkers Avenue, Lincoln Avenue	
30	Platform B	to Yonkers; Getty Square; Riverdale Avenue		Palmer Road, Pondfield Road, Webster Avenue	No Sunday service.
42	Platform B	to Wakefield, Bronx; 233rd Street and White Plains Road at 233rd Street ( 2 5 trains)		West First Street, Pelhamdale Avenue	Weekend and evening service ends at 241st Street instead of 233rd Street.; The last PM trip to the Bronx operates via Sound Shore Medical Center in New Rochelle.
45	Platform D	Pelham Bay Park, Bronx; Bruckner Boulevard at Pelham Bay Park ( 6 <6> trains)	Eastchester; Mill Road and White Plains Road	Pelham Road, North Avenue	Most trips loop through downtown New Rochelle.; Open-door in the Bronx.
45Q	Platform D	New Rochelle; Main Street and Church Avenue	New Rochelle; Pine Brook Boulevard and Stratton Road (Top of the Ridge)	North Avenue, Pine Brook Boulevard	
61	Platform D	Fordham Plaza Bus Terminal at East 189th Street and Third Avenue (southbound or Fordham Road and Third Avenue (northbound)	Port Chester	Boston Post Road, Fifth Avenue, Halstead Avenue	U-Turns at NY-CT line
62	Platform D	Fordham, Bronx (at Tiebout Avenue and Fordham Road near Fordham Road ( B D trains)	White Plains TransCenter	Boston Post Road, New England Thruway, Westchester Avenue	Express to White Plains
66	Platform C	to Dobbs Ferry at either Dobbs Ferry railroad station or Mercy College		Ashford Avenue, Ardsley Road, Weaver Street, Palmer Avenue	Weekday service only.; Some rush hour service originates/terminates at Dobbs Ferry railroad station instead of Mercy College.
91	Platform C	Yonkers; Yonkers station	Rye Playland	Yonkers Avenue, South Fulton Avenue, Sandford Boulevard, Pelhamdale Avenue, Boston Post Road, New England Thruway	Limited-stop service, Nonstop from New Rochelle to Playland.

== Bibliography ==
- Beacher, Melvin, Architect (February 2005). Interview regarding 1989 restoration.
- Hawes, George (January 1884). NY,·NH, & HRR Passenger Station Plans. New Rochelle, New York.
- Stage JA Archaeological Survey of the Inter-modal Transportation Center. New Rochelle, New York: Historical Perspectives, Inc. 1999.
- Jenkins, Stephen (1912). The Story of the Bronx from the Purchase Made by the Dutch from the Indians in 1639 to the Present Day. New York, New York: G.P. Putnam's Sons.
- Marchant, Robert (December 11, 1989). "Officials finishing restoration plans for the New Rochelle Train Station". Standard Star.
- Taylor, David L. (1998). Building-Structure Inventory Form: Metro North Railroad Station. New Rochelle, New York.
- Wald, Matthew (July 23, 1989). "Resolving the Fate of New Rochelle's Station". New York Times.
- Wines, Roger (March 1, 1991). "Railroad Station Re-dedication". New Rochelle, New York.
