= Ernest Daltroff =

French perfumer

- Born: Ernest Léon René Lucien Daltroff; 17 November 1867; Sainte-Cécile, Saône-et-Loire, France
- Died: 3 February 1941 (aged 73); New York, US
- Occupations: Perfumeur; entrepreneur
- Known for: Founding Parfums Caron

Ernest Daltroff (17 November 1867 – 3 February 1941), was a French perfumer and the founder of Parfums Caron in 1904.

== Biography ==
Ernest Léon René Lucien Daltroff was born to an upper middle class family originally from Russia. His mother Ida-Caroline Bing used to put a drop of her perfume behind her son's ears before bed as a child.

In his youth Ernest Daltroff travelled and then worked in the clothing industry. In 1900, he visited the Exposition Universelle.

Shortly after, as he memorised the captivating scents of flowers, fruits and spices and developed an exceptional olfactory memory, without any formal training, he chose to embark on the profession of perfumer.

In 1903, with his brother Raoul, he established a workshop in Asnières-sur-Seine in the former perfumery "Emilia", 12 avenue de la Lauzière. Then in 1904, at the age of thirty-seven, he set up his company in premises located in the heart of Paris, at 10 rue de la Paix. Already planning to reach an international market, he partly adopted the name of the small "Mercerie Parfumerie Caron" at 20 rue Rossini (9th arrondissement of Paris), bought from Madame Anne-Marie Caron on 1 August 1903. He chose "Parfums Caron", a short name easily remembered and pronounced in several languages while still being associated with France, rather than his own foreign sounding name, in a country still troubled by the Dreyfus affair.

In 1906, he met Félicie Wanpouille, a young milliner who worked on the same rue de la Paix; She introduced him to her clients and became his collaborator and muse.

While Daltroff created fragrances, Wanpouille designed bottles and served as an artistic director, together they launched great women's perfumes such as Narcisse Noir in 1911, N'aimez Que Moi in 1917.

After World War I, in 1918, Ernest Daltroff was invited to attend the Bronx International Exposition of Science, Arts and Industries in New York with his competitor François Coty. He won the prize for the most go ahead company, which opened up the American market for him during the inter-war period.

Many creations followed, including: Tabac Blond, En Avion, Fleurs De Rocaille and Nuit de Noël; In his innovative palette, like François Coty, Daltroff often incorporated the bases produced by Mr. Naef and the Fabriques de Laire, in particular Mousse de Saxe.

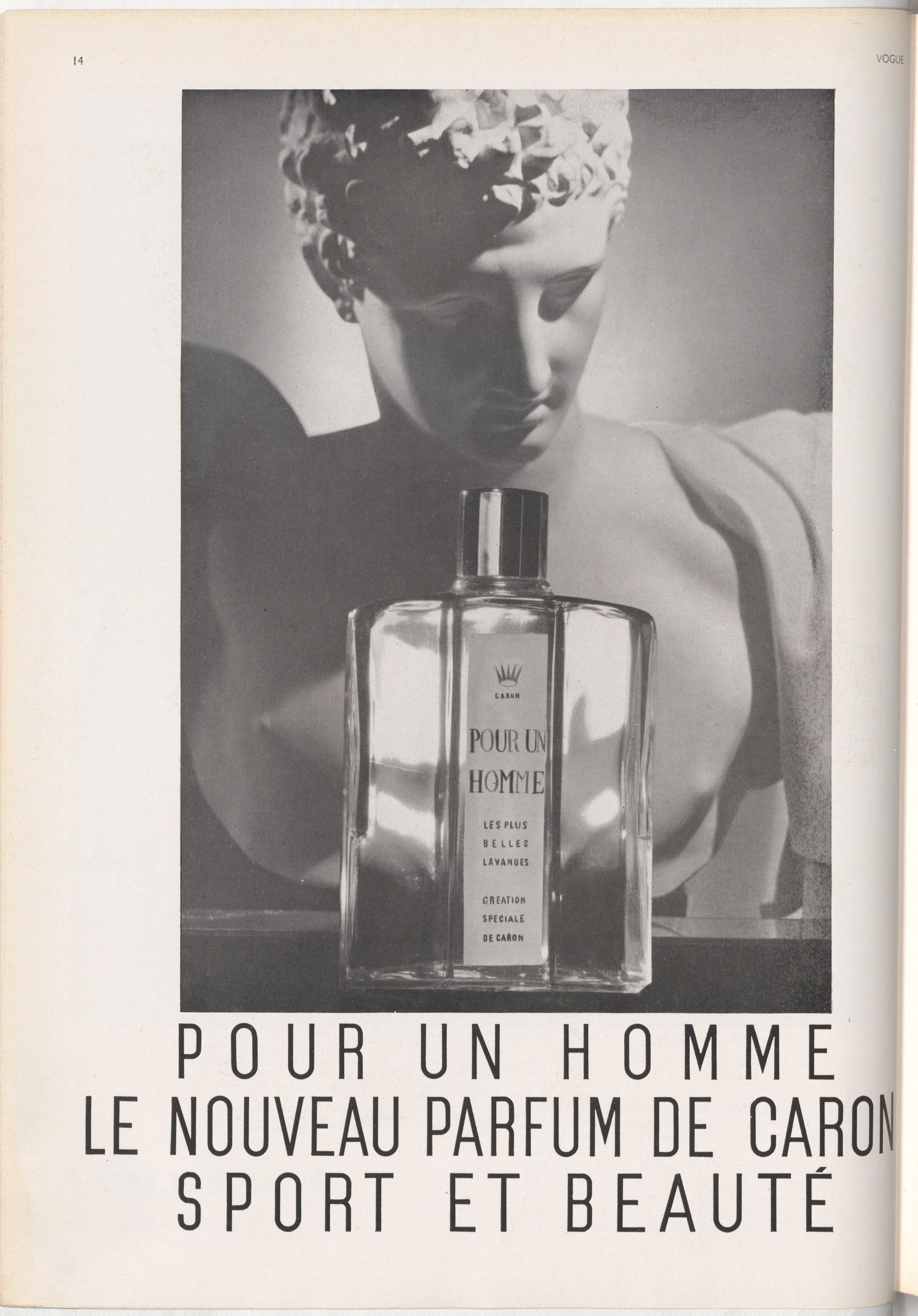
Parfums Caron, Vogue 1934.

In 1923 a Caron boutique was opened on Fifth Avenue in New York. In 1932, Daltroff marries Madeleine Briet (1888-1987), and in 1934, Ernest Daltroff, who was always convinced that a man should wear perfume, launched Pour Un Homme, at a time, when men mainly used cologne.

In 1939, the rise of antisemitism led Ernest Daltroff to take refuge in the United States, arriving early 1940 on board The Manhattan and registering at Ellis Island. In France, Félicie took over the reins of the house until 1962 with Michel Morsetti, a perfumer trained by Daltroff. Ernest Daltroff never returned to Europe, and died in New York on 3 February 1941.

== Posterity ==
In 2000, in homage to Ernest Daltroff, perfumer Richard Fraysse created for the house of Caron, Lady Caron presented in a bottle engraved with the Statue of Liberty. "The challenge was, fifty years later, to imagine what Daltroff would have liked to create for the American woman".

Ernest Daltroff is described by Nathalie Chahine as the most subtle perfumer of his time whose work was closest to that of painters and musicians. His legacy continues in the world of perfume and still influences modern perfumers, says Michael Edwards.
