= Nancy Wallace (environmentalist) =

American environmentalist

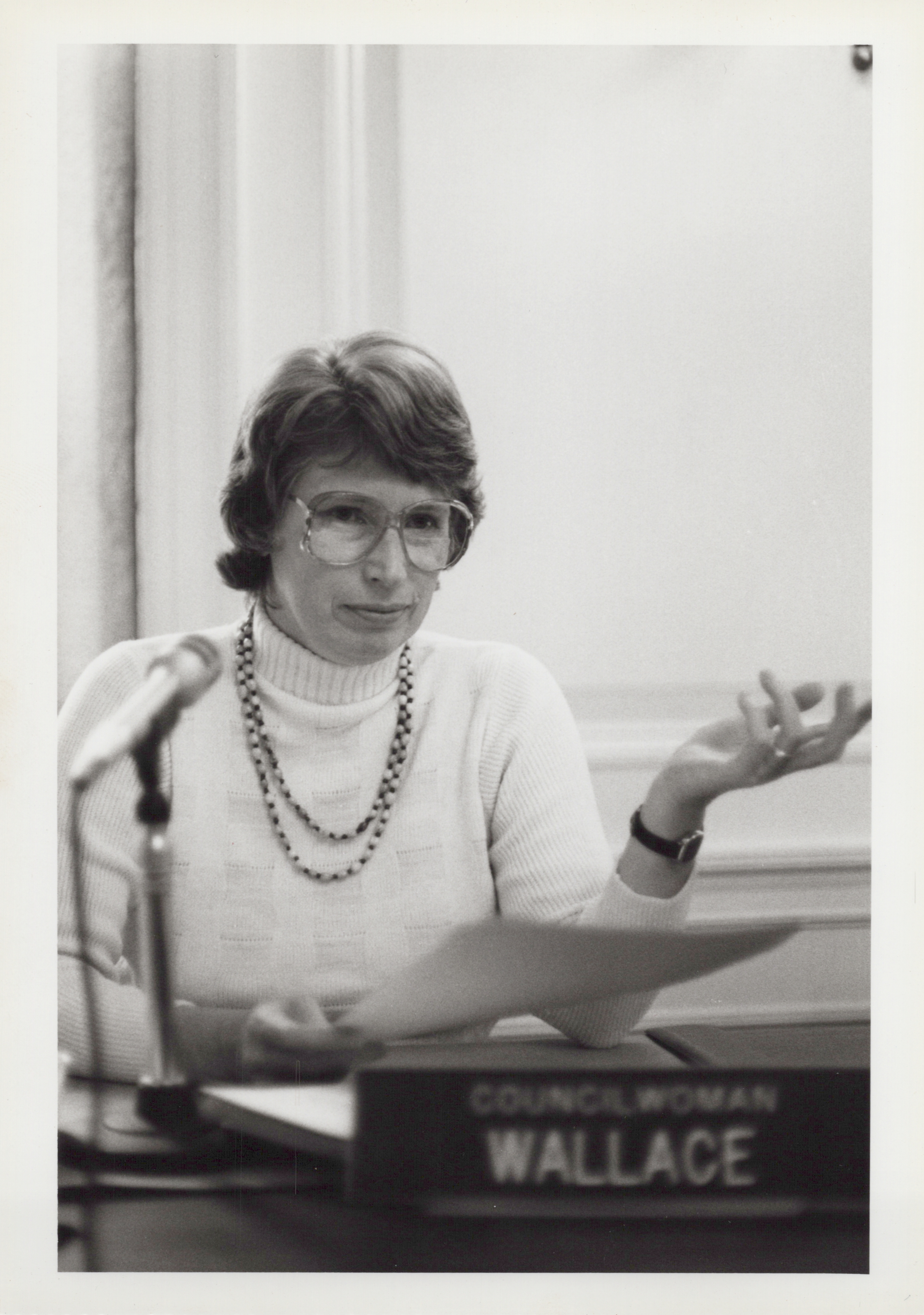
- Born: September 2, 1930; Marblehead, Massachusetts
- Died: February 15, 2024 (aged 93); Marblehead, Massachusetts
- Spouse: Bruce A. Wallace
- Children: 3

Nancy Wallace (September 2, 1930 - February 15, 2024) was an American educator and civic leader known for her work cleaning up the Bronx River in New York City.

== Early life and education ==
Wallace was born Ann Seaver Coolidge Upton, to Anna Pennypacker Upton and Edward Upton on September 2, 1930. Although she was formally named Ann, she was called "Nancy" from birth. When she ran for public office in 1977, she had her name legally changed to "Ann U. Wallace AKA Nancy Wallace," because everyone knew her only as Nancy.

Wallace graduated from Marblehead High School in 1947, and from Smith College with a bachelor's degree in English in 1951. She married Bruce A. Wallace, an MIT graduate and mechanical engineer, on December 26, 1954. After living in numerous locations around the country and overseas for his work, they finally settled in White Plains, New York in 1959, where they lived for almost 54 years. In 2013, they moved back to Nancy's childhood home in Marblehead, MA. They had three children; David, Gail, and Lane.

== Career ==
After graduating from Smith college, Wallace began working with inner city teenagers, first with the YWCA in Patterson, NJ and then in Harlem, NY as part of her graduate studies at Union Theological Seminary. In the mid-1960s, after she and her husband Bruce moved to White Plains, NY, she became heavily involved in community issues there, including working with the local PTA on a plan to desegregate the public school system and advocating for responsible community development and conservation as president of the Fisher Hill Neighborhood Association. That community involvement and organizing led to her serving on the city's Planning Commission, and then, in 1977, being elected to the White Plains Common Council. As a Councilwoman she was responsible for passing the city's groundbreaking, anti-discriminatory Fair Housing Law and for negotiating greater greenspace in the city's urban development plans.

After leaving government, Wallace joined the non-profit organization Bronx River Restoration (BXRR), first serving on its Board of Directors and then becoming its executive director in 1983. It was a natural fit. "I'd always been interested in environmental issues and causes," she explained. "Even my children were taught to fold their paper lunch bags very carefully and bring them home so we could reuse them.

When Wallace took over as executive director, the Bronx River was "a no man's land;" so polluted that almost no fish were living in it, and silt, refuse and debris were stacked more than six feet tall along large stretches of its banks. Tires, cars and other discarded trash filled the river, and raw sewage was still being dumped into it.

To tackle the challenge of cleaning up such an immense environmental disaster, Wallace had only two part-time employees and a total annual operating budget of $130,000. But she drew upon a combination of "political acumen, a knack for consensus-building and skills in community organizing" to create a critical mass of support and a public, private, and community coalition to clean up both the Bronx River and the land along its banks.

Wallace began by organizing small clean-up projects and creative public events to increase the organization's financial and community support, as well as visibility for the clean-up effort. In addition to ribbon cuttings and Clean Water Festivals, she helped gain the support of public officials by arranging innovative photo opportunities, such as having both New York City Parks Commissioner Henry J. Stern and New York City Mayor Ed Koch paddle canoes down newly-cleaned stretches of the river. Another time, she organized a Bronx River Golden Ball Festival where people had the opportunity to paddle down the river alongside a three-foot gold colored floating sphere. "It’s almost spiritual in nature," Wallace was quoted as saying. "We’re starting to see the river as one universal link between all these communities — in a way unifying them."

Wallace also understood that any lasting change was going to require involvement and ownership of the clean-up effort by the local community. In 1980, Bronx River Restoration had published a Master Plan which aimed to create "A clean, swimmable river enhanced with bike and walkways along its banks." But to help community awareness and support for that goal, Wallace developed environmental education curricula for school, after-school, and summer programs for local elementary, junior high, high school, and college students. She also got grants to provide local teenagers with summer jobs cleaning up the river and testing its water quality. In addition, she helped forge partnerships with other non-profit groups and worked with other institutions in the Bronx to do community outreach locally as well as in Manhattan to help people learn more about the Bronx and their interdependence with it.

In 1996, Wallace expanded those efforts by developing a "Riverkeeper" program to encourage community members to take responsibility for monitoring particular stretches of the river for garbage and water quality. The program proved enormously successful in garnering support not only from the community, but also from both private and public sources. Con Edison agreed to sponsor it, along with the New York City Parks Department. Later that year, Parks Commissioner Henry Stern announced the formation of a "Bronx Riverkeeper Alliance," consisting of the Parks Department, Con Edison, and Bronx River Restoration. Two years later, Stern declared 1999 "The Year of the Bronx River," a pronouncement that came with over $3 million in funding for projects to further the projects outlined in BXRR's 1980 Master Plan. At the same time, partnership efforts by the Bronx Riverkeeper Alliance drew more than 20 additional organizations together to work on the river as part of the Parks Department's newly formed Bronx River Working Group.

Between 1999 and 2001, the Riverkeeper Alliance was awarded an additional $71 million in city, state and federal funding for river clean up and land acquisition along the river. And with that money came enough support to create the same kind of public-private consortium that ran Prospect Park in Brooklyn. In 2001, the Bronx Riverkeeper Alliance and the Bronx River Working Group were folded into a broader and more formal coalition called "The Bronx River Alliance," representing more than 60 organizations and groups. Wallace called the achievement "the fulfillment of a dream."

Today, the Bronx River Alliance has more than 100 partners and an annual operating budget of approximately $3 million. The Bronx River Restoration's original 1980 vision of a swimmable, boatable, fishable, clean Bronx River with an 8-mile hike-bike pathway dotted with parks and greenspace along its entire route through the borough of the Bronx, is now a reality. In 2019, The New York Times listed the Bronx River Greenway as one of the top five hike/bike trails in New York City.

What's more, as one reporter noted, "As the river came back to life, so did the surrounding community." Wallace had foreseen that effect from the beginning; as she explained in 1994, "When kids get a sense that you can do something about the river, they also sense you can do something about their community."

After 23 years as the Executive Director of Bronx River Restoration, Nancy Wallace finally retired in 2006. The very next year, the Wildlife Conservation Society in the Bronx reported a sighting of a beaver in the river for the first time in two hundred years.
