= Westchester Avenue station =

Former railroad station in the Bronx, New York

Westchester Avenue
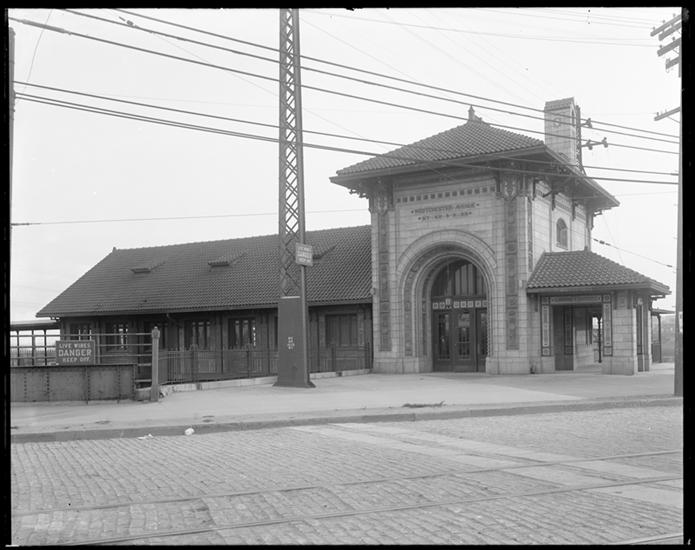
- Circa 1915

General information
- Location: Near southeast corner of Westchester Avenue and Sheridan Boulevard, Longwood, The Bronx, New York, United States
- Coordinates: 40.827660°N 73.885417°W
- Owner: Amtrak

Construction
- Architect: Cass Gilbert

History
- Opened: 1908
- Closed: 1937

Former services
| Preceding station | New York, New Haven and Hartford Railroad | Following station |
|---|---|---|
| Hunts Point toward New York Harlem River | Harlem River Branch | West Farms toward New Rochelle |
| Preceding station | New York, Westchester and Boston Railway | Following station |
| Hunts Point toward Harlem River | Main Line | 180th Street toward White Plains or Port Chester via Columbus Avenue |
Location

The Westchester Avenue station is a former railroad station located in the Bronx in New York City, partially suspended over Amtrak's busy Northeast Corridor line. It was built in 1908 with rich terra cotta detailing to a design by Cass Gilbert, who would later employ similar terra cotta detailing in his 1910 design for the Woolworth Building. Train service to the station ceased in 1937, and as of 2022 the station was a ruin in poor condition.

The Westchester Avenue station is located just to the southeast of the intersection of Westchester Avenue and Sheridan Boulevard, in the Longwood section of the South Bronx. The Bronx River is a short distance to the east. The structure consists of a taller entry hall portion that stands on solid ground immediately to the west of the tracks, and a shorter waiting room section that is suspended over the tracks on metal beams. Formerly, this section had staircases that led down to low platforms at track level, but these were removed long ago. The entry hall portion has colorful glazed architectural terra cotta ornamentation, including a caduceus near the eaves, topped with the letters NYH. Though this seems to refer to the New York, New Haven and Hartford Railroad, the original builder of the station, the caduceus was also the symbol of the New York, Westchester and Boston Railway, a local commuter railroad that also served the station.

== Historic use ==
The station was built in 1908 as part of the New York, New Haven and Hartford Railroad, which expanded its Harlem River Branch line into an electrified main line into New York. The railroad planned twelve new stations along the route to serve local commuters, and commissioned the architect Cass Gilbert to design them. Gilbert, who was already renowned for having designed the U.S. Custom House in Lower Manhattan, produced plans for each of these in a number of different styles, though not all were actually built. For the station at Westchester Avenue, Gilbert chose a richly ornamented exterior with glazed terra cotta details and signage with gold colored metallic lettering. Gilbert would later incorporate glazed terra cotta details into his design for the Woolworth Building, which was completed in 1913.

The line became very active with intercity train service, and remains presently as part of the Northeast Corridor between Boston, Massachusetts and Washington, D.C. The line failed to attract local commuter traffic, however, particularly once the New York City Subway with its five-cent fare was extended to much of the area beginning in 1920, and the local stations along the route became uneconomical to maintain. New Haven trains stopped serving Westchester Avenue and other local stations in 1931, and all the stations were finally abandoned when the New York, Westchester and Boston ceased operations in 1937.

During the Prohibition era the ground-floor commercial space beneath the waiting room was home to a well-known speakeasy nicknamed "The Platform", which made no serious effort at concealment. Patrons would simply walk up the wide terra-cotta staircase as if buying a ticket and ask for a "11:47" before continuing into the former baggage room. It was openly discussed by law enforcement officers who made no move to shut it down, partially due to it sitting on a jurisdictional gray zone.

== Planned restoration ==
By 2009, the Westchester Avenue station was in an advanced state of disrepair and in danger of collapse. Three other Gilbert stations, all in the Bronx, were also extant. One of these, the Bartow/City Island Station, was also abandoned and near collapse, while the other two, somewhat altered, have found other uses, Morris Park as a gun club and Hunts Point as a commercial building.

Amtrak owns the station and the land it occupies and has listed it as a trackside structure in need of demolition. The New York Landmarks Conservancy, a private advocacy group, has placed the station on its list of endangered landmarks in New York City, but no governmental agency has extended protection or even recognition to the structure. It is not a designated New York City landmark nor is it listed on the National Register of Historic Places.

Several proposals for restoration and reuse have come and gone over the years. In 2011, architects Amanda Schachter and Alexander Levi received a grant to develop a new proposal, which they presented in late 2012. Their plan would split the station into two pieces. The tower entry hall would remain where it is and serve as a pedestrian entryway to Concrete Plant Park, which was completed in 2010, and to the Bronx River Greenway, which was still under development at the time. The waiting room portion over the tracks would be removed and rebuilt very nearby on a pier in the Bronx River. This plan gained some notice in the press, but as yet no source of funding for the project seems to have been identified. In July 2015 the plan was integrated with the Bronx River Greenway extension plan.

== Gallery ==
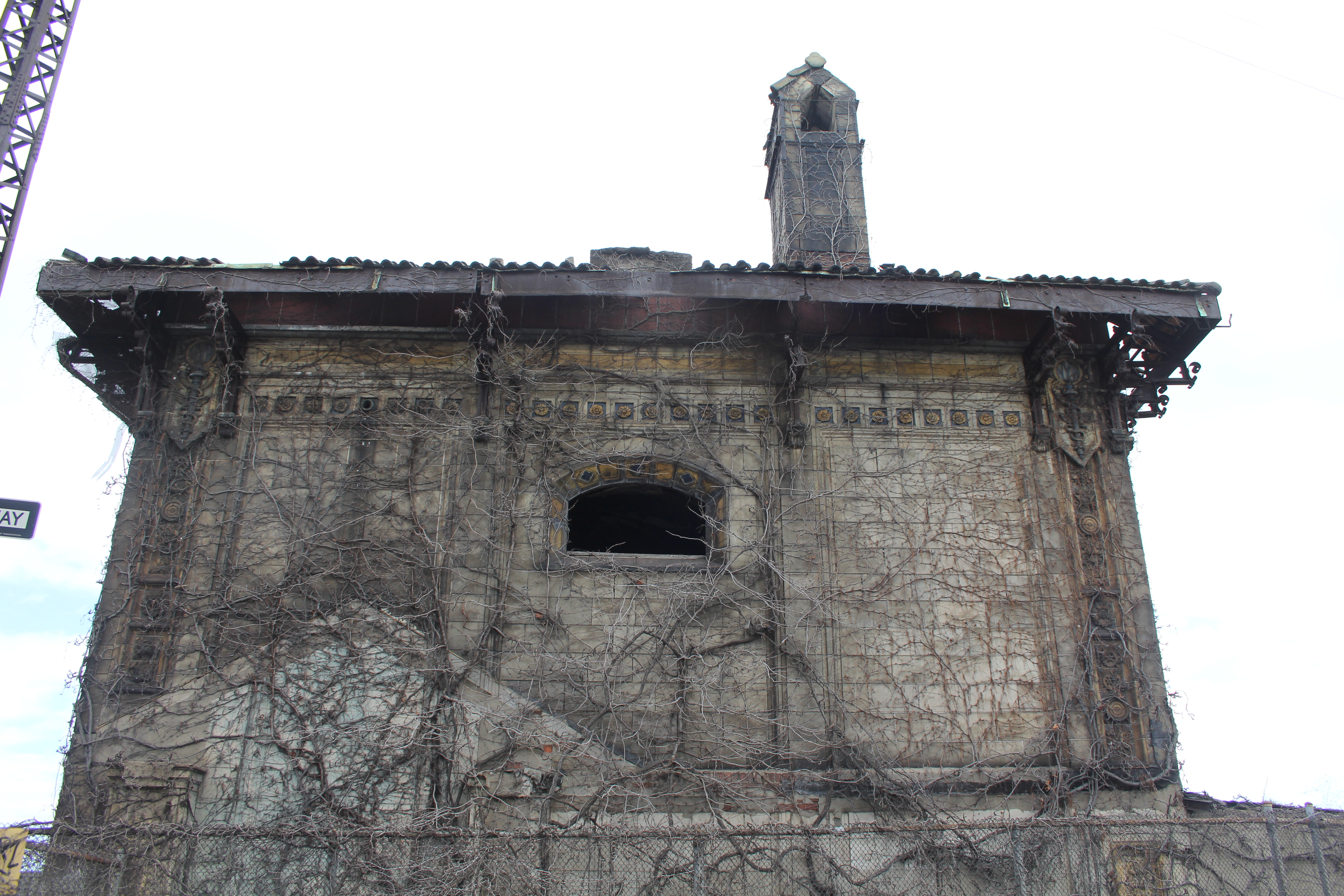
Detail of roof line tower entry hall portion of station

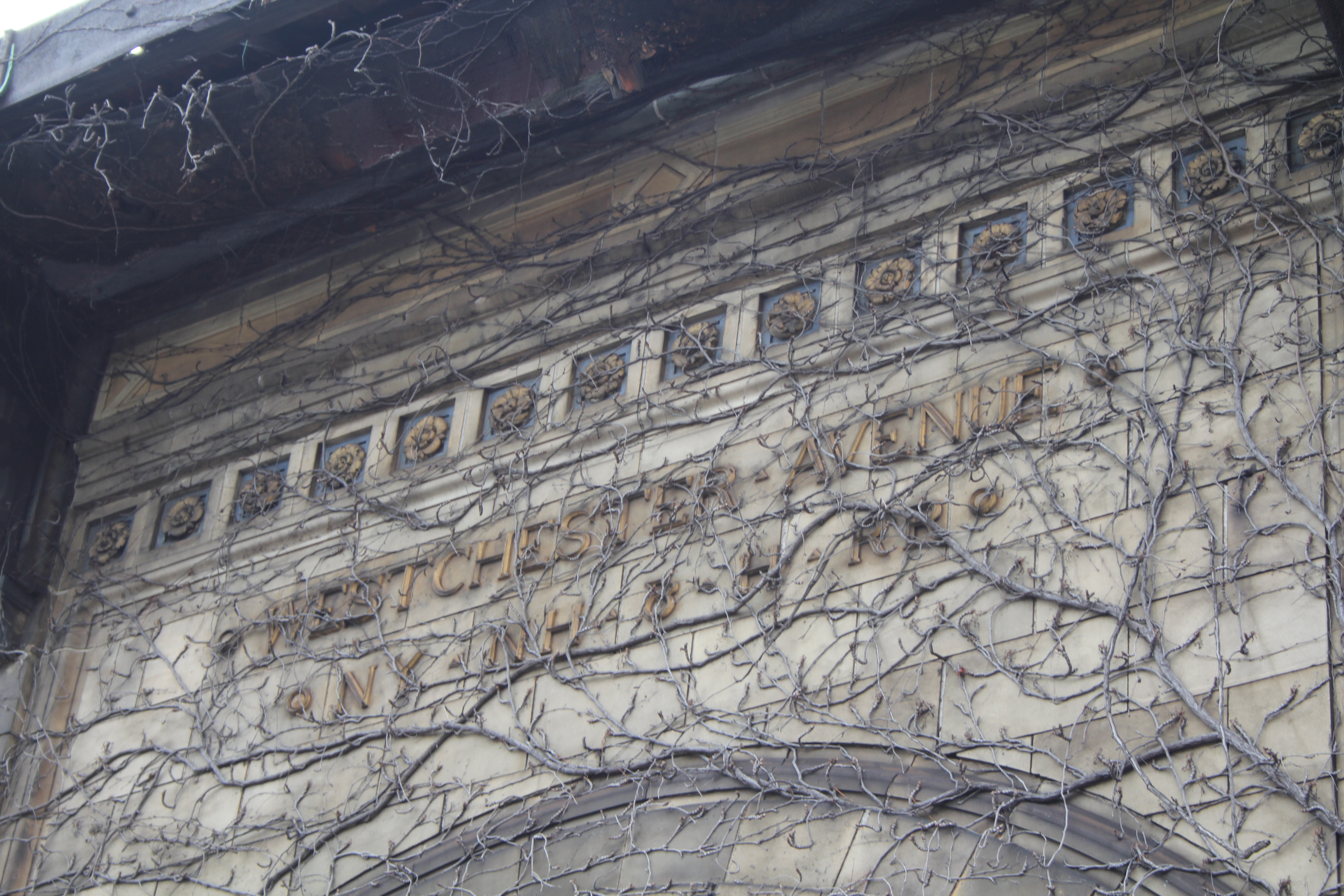
Signage of metallic letters that remains largely intact

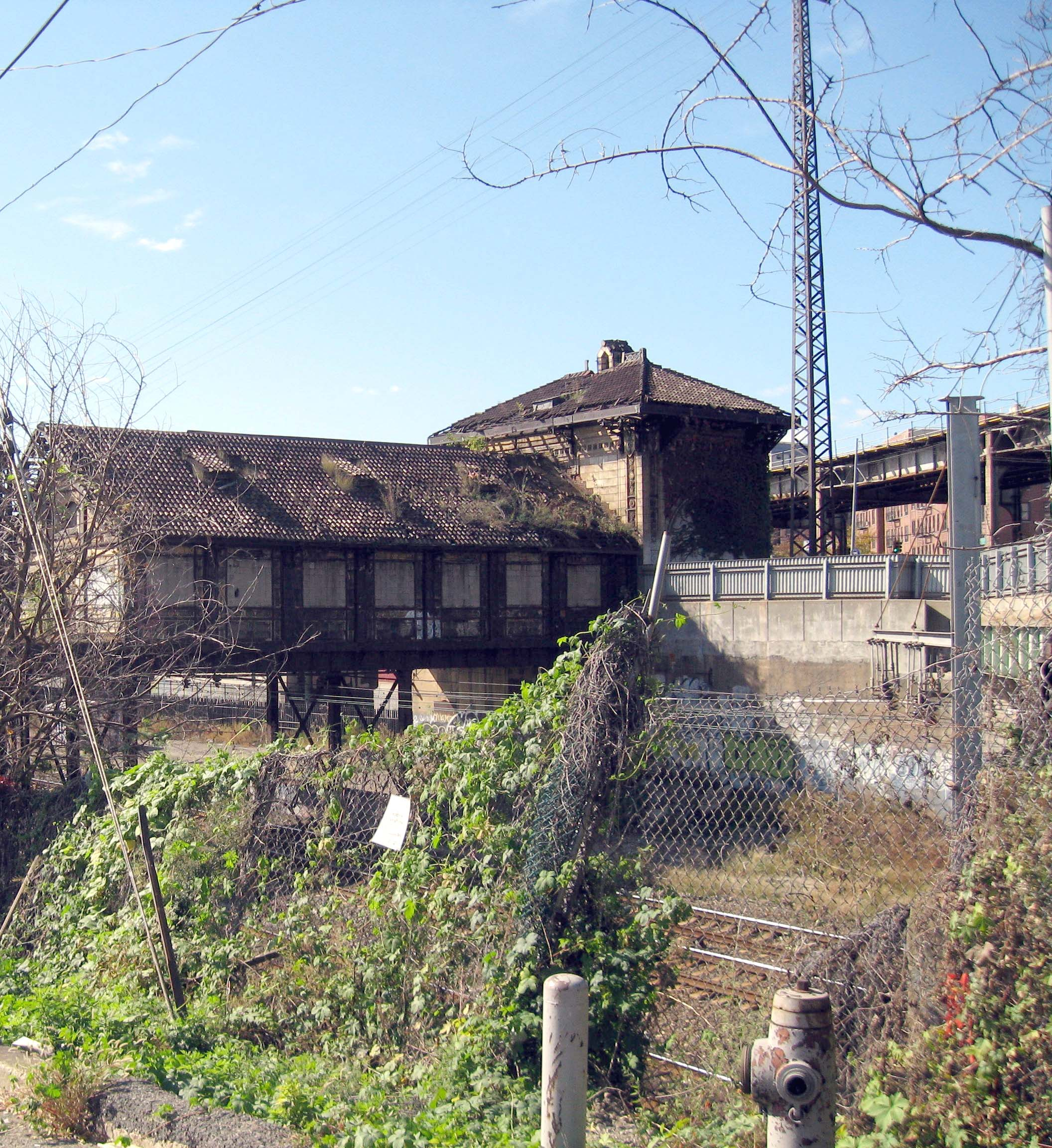
As seen from the northeast (Concrete Plant Park entry)

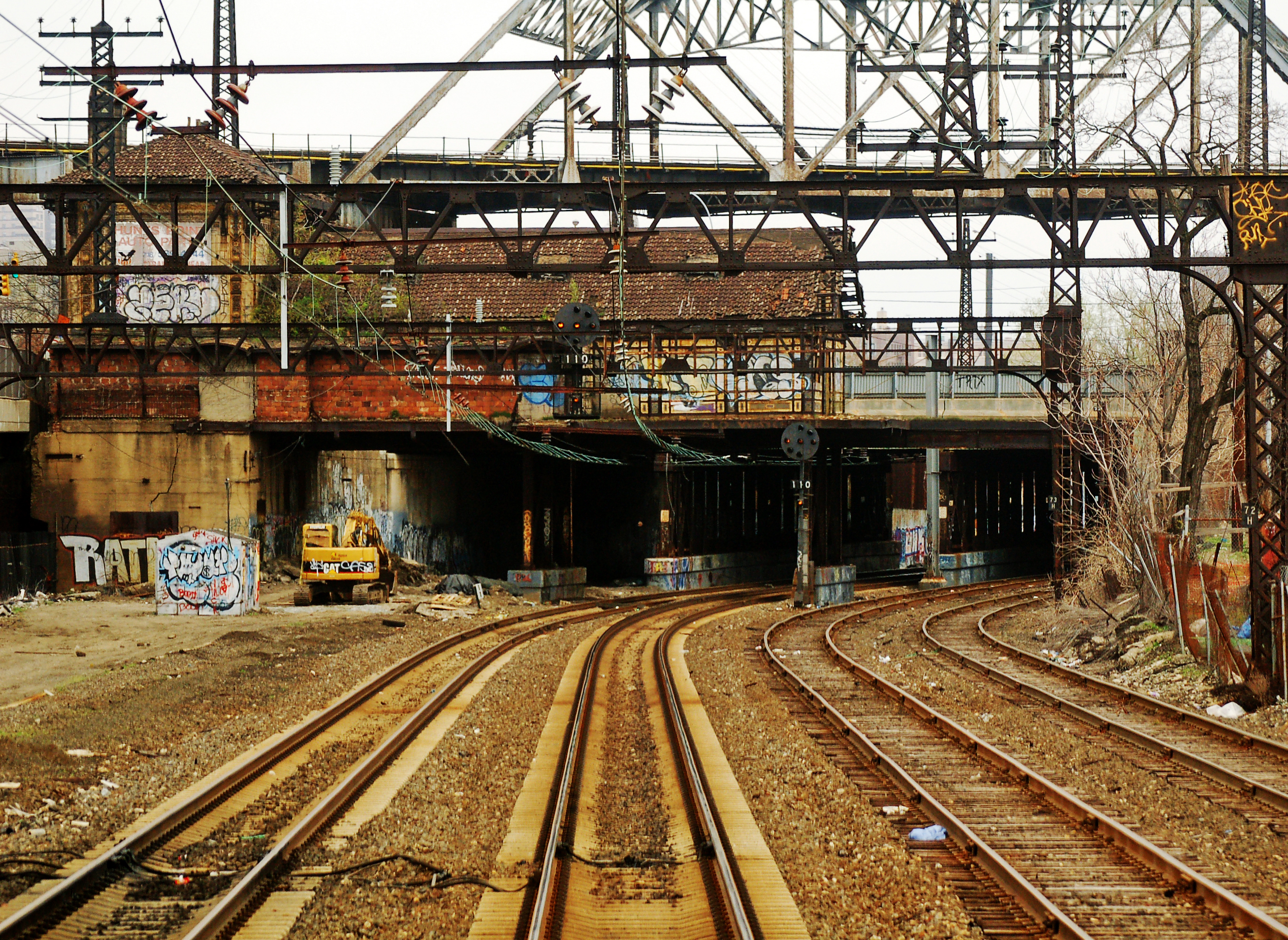
As seen from the rear of a southbound train on the Northeast Corridor

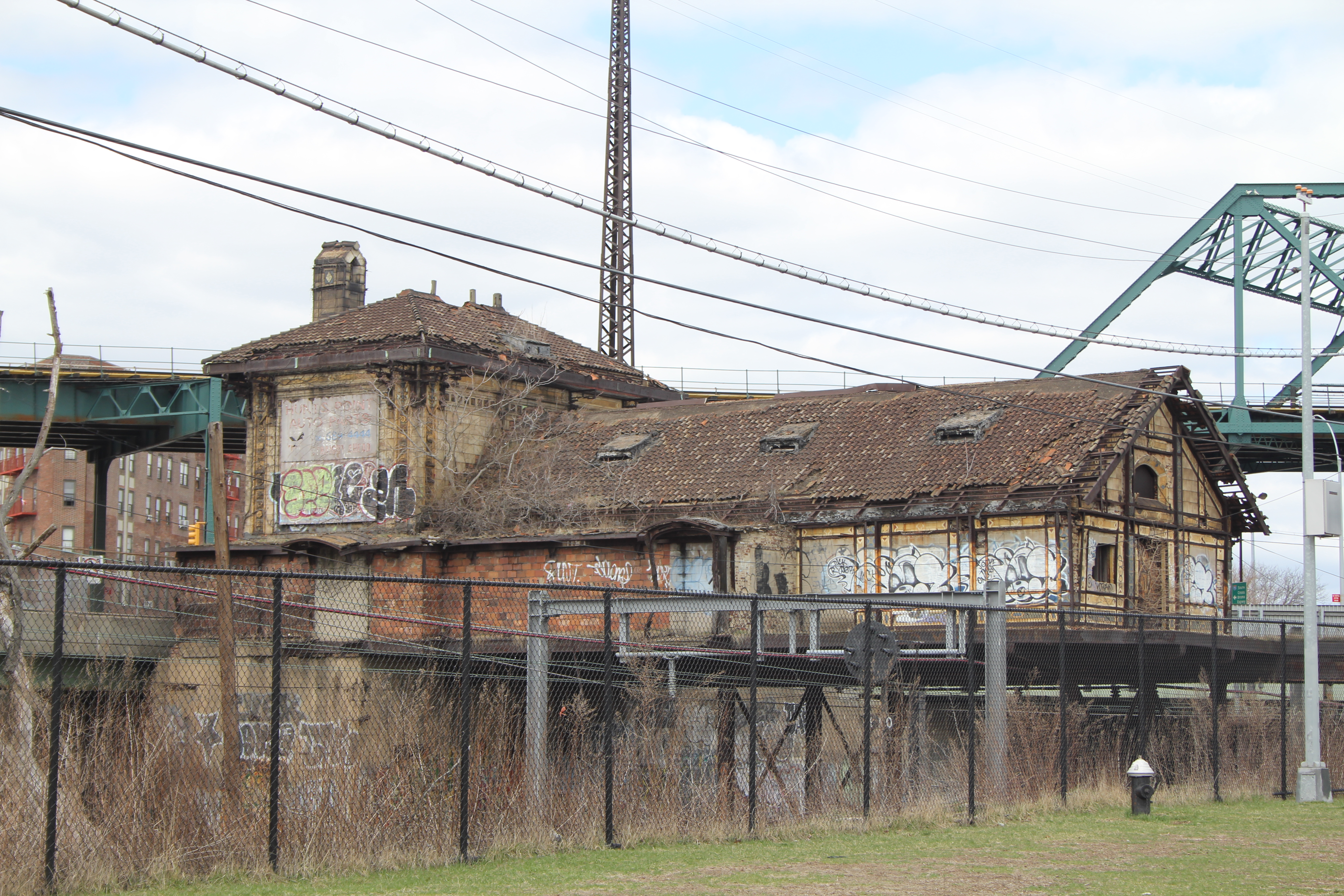
Seen from the southeast showing waiting room section suspended over tracks
