= Parfums Caron =

French perfume house

Caron
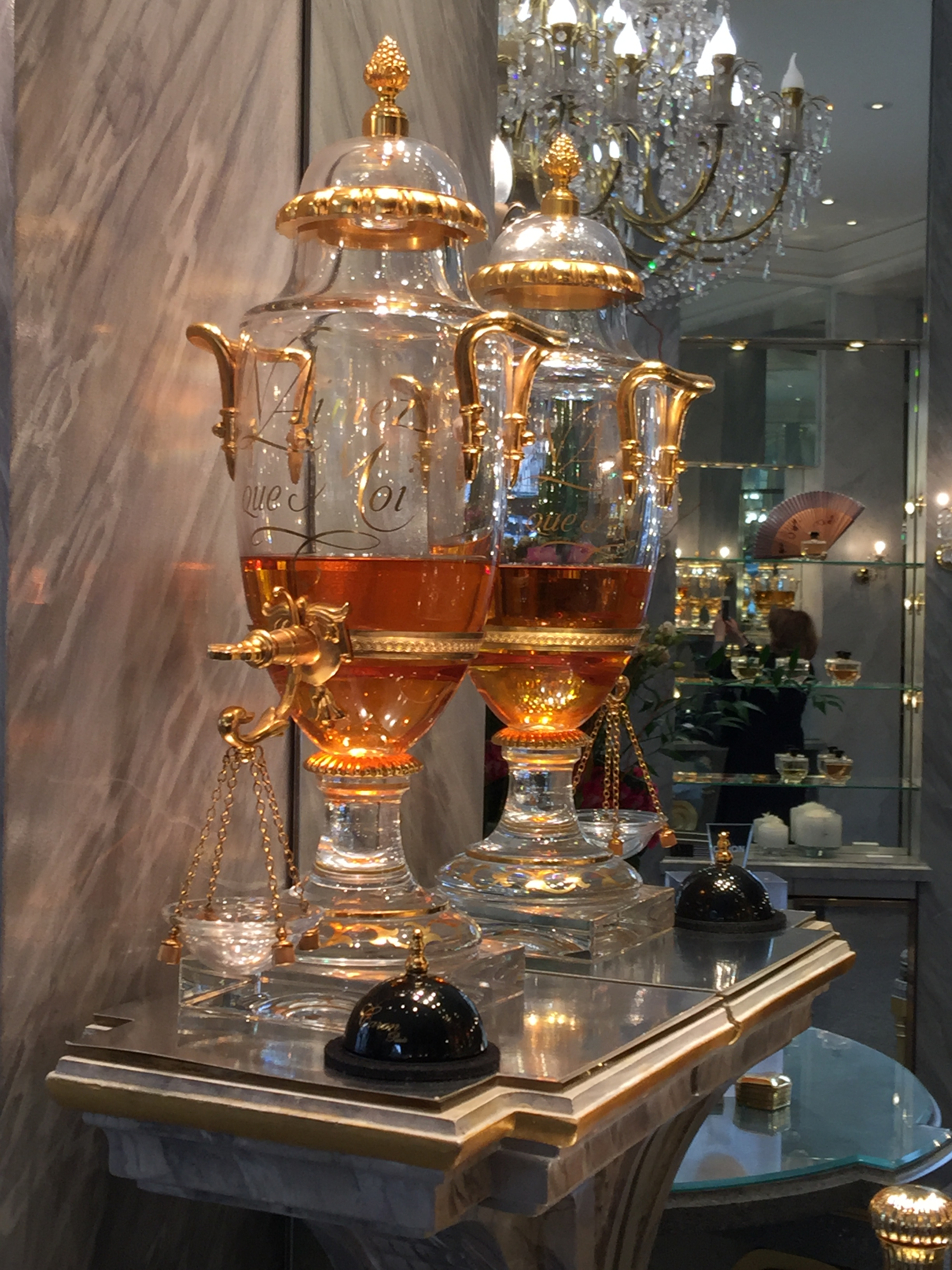
- Perfume Urns, Caron, Paris.
- Type: Société par actions simplifiée
- Industry: Perfume
- Founded: 1904; 122 years ago
- Founder: Ernest Daltroff
- Headquarters: 8th arrondissement of Paris
- Key people: Félicité Wanpouille; Michel Morsetti
- Products: Perfume, Powder
- Website: Official website

Parfums Caron is a French perfume house founded in 1904 by Ernest Daltroff. Over the course of the years, many Caron Perfumes were created. As of 2019, the brand is owned by Luxembourg-based Cattleya.

== Foundation ==
Caron was founded in 1904 by Ernest Daltroff (1867-1941) who chose a short name, easy to remember in several languages while still being associated with France. The house was first located at 10 rue de la Paix in Paris.

In 1906, Daltroff met Félicie Wanpouille (1874-1967), a young milliner who also worked on rue de la Paix, she introduced him to her clients, and soon became his business partner and muse. He created the perfumes and she created the bottles.

Perfumes and powders were distributed in France through a network of Parisian department stores, then as early as 1923 Caron entered the American market.

== Perfumes ==
The house's first famous perfume, Narcisse Noir (1911), reached Hollywood. In the 1950s, on the set of Sunset Boulevard, Gloria Swanson pronounces the name of the perfume. The title of the 1947 film Black Narcissus refers to this very perfume.

First created in powder form, the perfume N'Aimez Que Moi was launched in 1917, designed for young women waiting for the return of their beloved who had gone to war.

In 1919, World War I was over and women discovered the pleasure of smoking tobacco. Caron invented the perfume Tabac Blond.

In 1932, after the exploits of the first female pilots, Daltroff launched En Avion.

As women discover sport and speed, Daltroff created a light and dynamic fragrance that reflected the new lifestyle. In 1933, he launched Fleurs de Rocaille, which represents the modern femininity of the 1930s.

In 1934, at a time when men mainly used colognes, Daltroff, who was always convinced that a man should wear perfume, boldly launched a masculine fragrance Pour un homme.

After World War II, in 1954, Félicie Wanpouille launched a new perfume called Poivre.

The production of Caron fragrance bottles was at times entrusted to workshops such as Baccarat or Daum.

The house is also known for its loose powders scented with Bulgarian Rose, the Pompon Poudre.

== Business ==
Caron is one of the oldest French perfume houses still exclusively dedicated to perfume.

After World War I, in 1918, Ernest Daltroff was invited to the Bronx International Exposition of Science, Arts and Industries in New York with his competitor François Coty, where he won the prize for the most go-ahead company, opening up the American market for him for the Interwar period.

In 1923 a New York affiliate, "The Caron Corporation", opened a store on Fifth Avenue, and a factory outside the city. In 1925, three quarters of Caron's total business was in the United States.

In 1939, Ernest Daltroff moved to New York and left the management in France to Félicité Wanpouille. During the German military administration in occupied France during World War II, the company was heavily taxed and in 1941, Caron risked spoliation.

As soon as the war ended, Félicité Wanpouille, who ran the company with her husband Jean Bergaud and perfumer Michel Morsetti trained by Daltroff, moved Caron to sumptuous quarters decorated by Maison Jansen at 10 Place Vendôme. When she retired in 1962, the company was bought by Revillon Frères. President Jean-Paul Elkann sold the salons on Place Vendôme and trivialised the brand, which nevertheless remained in French hands in spite of an offer to purchase 80,000 shares by Robins of Richmond, Virginia. In 1979, manager Henri Bertrand, who came from Jean Patou, wished for a return to the brand's original values and opened a boutique on Avenue Montaigne. In 1986, during the Révillon-Cora merger-acquisition, the group did not wish to support its manager in the prestigious direction he had taken.

In 1997 Caron was sold to L.T. Piver and the following year was acquired by Ales Groupe, which modernised some fragrances and insisted on quality and natural ingredients, opened a boutique near the Élysée Palace and another on Madison Avenue in New York, also aiming at opening the Middle East market, and targeting the Russian one. Ales sold the brand at the end of 2018 to Cattleya Finance.

Caron received the "Living Heritage Company" label from France and is a member of the Comité Colbert.

== Bibliography ==
- Jean-Marie Martin-Hattemberg (2000). Caron. Milan (fr/en). ISBN 9782841138616.
- Monsen and Baer (2001). The Magic of Perfume: The perfumes of Caron. Michael DeFina, Randall Bruce Monsen. ISBN 9781928655015.
