= Starlight Park =

Public park in the Bronx, New York

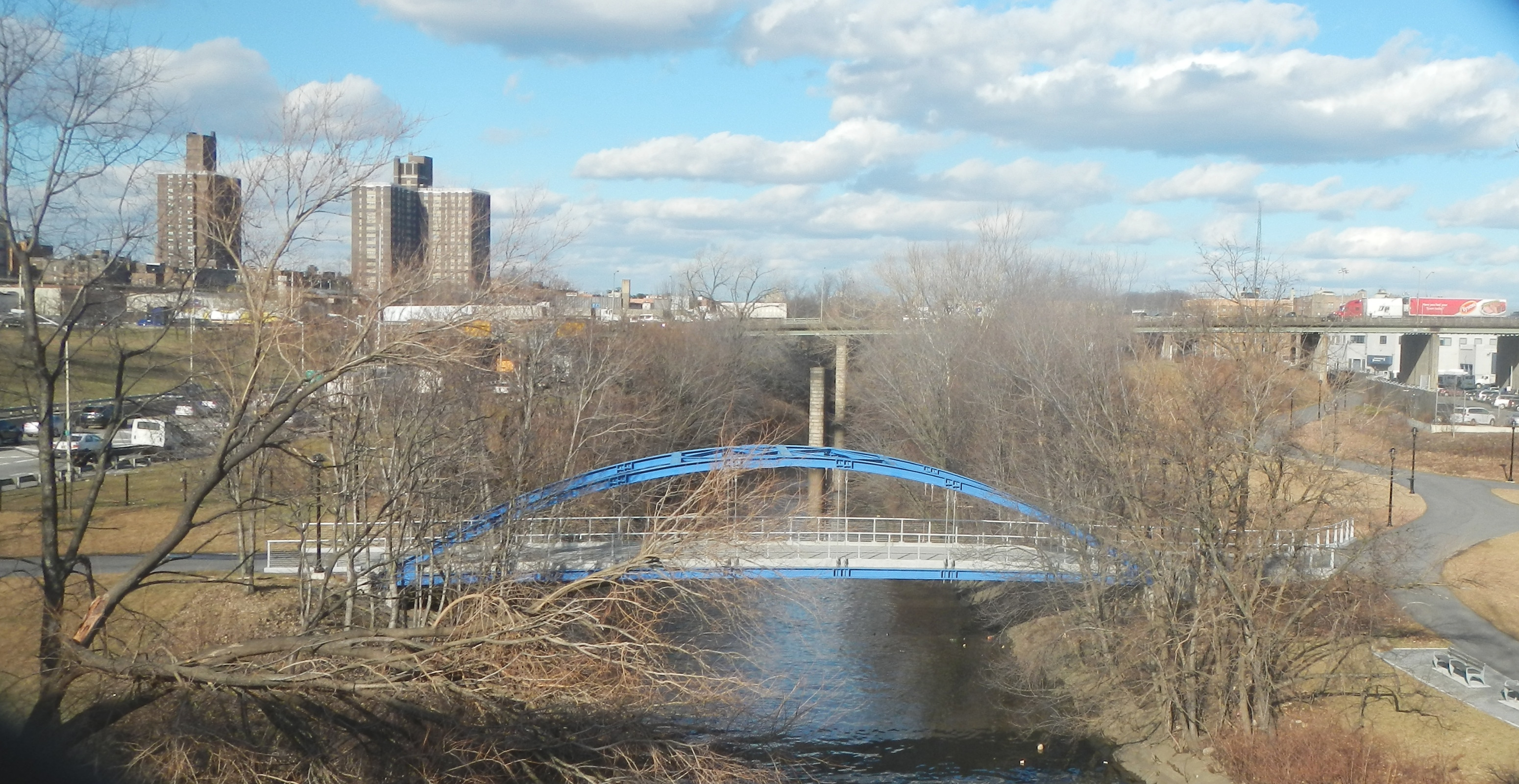
- Pedestrian bridge north of the 174th Street bridge
- Interactive map of Starlight Park
- Type: Urban park
- Location: West Farms and Crotona Park East, Bronx, New York City
- Coordinates: 40°50′13″N 73°52′48″W
- Area: 13 acres (5.3 ha)
- Opened: 1950s
- Operator: NYC Parks
- Status: Open
- Public transit: Subway: to Whitlock Avenue, to West Farms Square–East Tremont Avenue; Bus: Bx11, Bx36

Starlight Park
- Previously known as Exposition Park (during the 1918 Bronx International Exposition of Science, Arts and Industries)
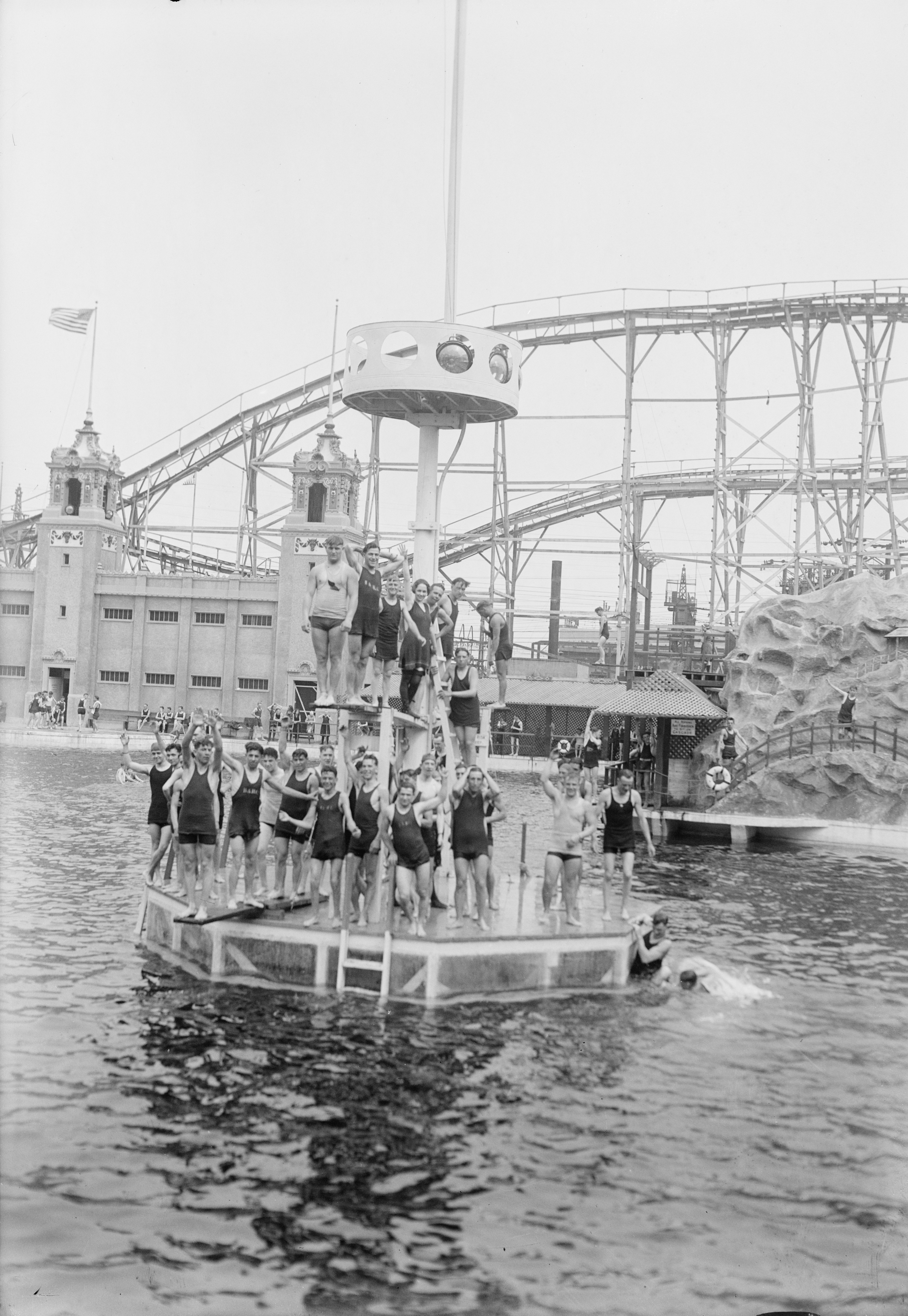
- Bathers at the Cascade in Starlight Park, 1921.
- Interactive map of Starlight Park
- Location: Bronx, New York, United States
- Coordinates: 40°50′13″N 73°52′48″W
- Opened: 1918
- Closed: 1937
- Theme: Amusement park

Starlight Park is a public park located along the Bronx River in the Bronx in New York City. Starlight Park stands on the site of an amusement park of the same name that operated in the first half of the 20th century.

The amusement park was originally built for the Bronx International Exposition of Science, Arts and Industries, which was hosted in 1918, and as such the park was known as Exposition Park during that time. During its heyday, Starlight Park featured various amusement rides, as well as the Bronx Coliseum and the submarine USS Holland. Much of the park was destroyed in a 1932 fire, though the remaining attractions continued to operate until 1946.

The northeastern part of the amusement park became the West Farms Depot of MTA Regional Bus Operations. A city park, operated by the New York City Department of Parks and Recreation, was built in the late 1950s as part of the construction of the Sheridan Expressway. The highway was built parallel to the Bronx River on the former site of the amusement park.

== History ==
=== Amusement park ===
==== Early years ====
The site had originally contained the estate of politician William Waldorf Astor. Exposition Park was initially leased in 1914 as part of the plans for the Bronx International Exposition of Science, Arts and Industries, which opened in 1918. The exposition, intended to showcase the recent creation of Bronx County, was so unsuccessful that it only attracted one country, Brazil. The park was renamed Starlight Park on October 18, 1919, shortly after the exposition's close. The Bronx Expositions Corporation purchased numerous rides and attractions, and converted the "exhibition hall" to an ice rink and dance hall.

The rebranded Starlight Park opened in 1920. Throughout that year Starlight Park's operators added several attractions and concessions, including shooting galleries, games of chance, and a dark ride through an exhibit of "grottos and other worldly sights". The park continued to add attractions and events for the 1921 season, including a baseball field, several shows, and a kid's club. Further additions in 1922 included a sound system by the pool area; a program of movies broadcast from a projector; and rides such as electric riding cars, the Gyroplane, and the Maelstrom. Numerous promotional events were also held that year, including a Film Players Club fundraiser, a singing contest, and a "Surprise Week" featuring a different performance each day of the week.

==== Lawsuit and incidents ====
In December 1920 the Bronx Expositions Corporation was the subject of a breach of contract lawsuit filed by Exposition Catering, which at the time was one of the largest lawsuits filed in the entertainment industry. According to the lawsuit, the Expositions Corporation had failed to uphold a contract to build an elaborate entrance, a convention center, and a permanent exposition, and had instead erected "a cheap amusement park" because of their mismanagement of money. The outcome of the lawsuit was unknown. During this time, several other lawsuits were filed against the park because of numerous incidents which resulted in injuries.

In 1922, there were two accidents that damaged the park's reputation. On May 21, a rider decided to stand up on the roller coaster as it rounded a curve, fell off, and was killed. The operator applied the emergency brake, injuring six other riders. That November, Starlight Park's large Exposition Hall was destroyed in a fire, and the park's Ferris wheel and scenic railway were also badly damaged. Two smaller dance halls replaced the Exposition Hall. Furthermore, the park in general was susceptible to fire because most of the buildings were flammable wooden structures. A thunderstorm on June 23, 1922, burned down several structures.

There were several other incidents that brought negative attention to Starlight Park. For instance, throughout the park's operation, there were numerous drownings in the pool area. Additionally, over two hundred bathers' items were stolen during a mass robbery in 1925. The following year, a boxer died in a match at Starlight Park. A circus performer died in 1930 after falling 40 feet (12 m) from a high wire.

==== Later years and closure ====
The park was at its largest in 1926 when it had 150 concessions and 26 rides. The following year saw the installation of the Forest Inn, a combined restaurant/performance venue. Many of the original attractions still remained, including the Bug House, Nonsense House, the Whip, a Noah's Ark, a Skee-Ball game, the wooden coaster, the Ferris wheel, the Frolic, the Motor Dome, the Whirlpool, Witching Waves, and the Canals of Venice. In 1929, the 15,000-seat Bronx Coliseum opened at Starlight Park, becoming the park's new sporting arena. With the start of the Great Depression in 1929, Starlight Park's operators installed several rides, as well as launched promotions such as free-admission days and contests, in an attempt to increase its visitor count. The park increased its schedule of events, as they were seen as more efficient than adding new rides.

On August 8, 1932, a large section of Starlight Park was destroyed in a fire that started under the already disused roller coaster and spread to numerous concessions. Fifteen thousand guests saw the fire, which was said to be started by several young boys. In the aftermath of the fire, the Coliseum was the largest remaining attraction and continued to keep the park profitable. Several political rallies, including those of the Communist Party USA, were held at the Coliseum. However, Starlight Park also continued to make a profit from the swimming pool, picnic areas, and sporting fields. Furthermore, in 1933, Starlight Park's manager added several recreational facilities in order to keep the park solvent. By this time, it was no longer envisioned as an amusement park.

By 1940, Starlight Park was bankrupt, and a portion of the park and Coliseum were sold at auction. The new owner, Richard F. Mount, leased the structures to a syndicate in May 1941, which in turn proposed building new sporting fields on the site. However, these plans were abridged by World War II and the United States Army took over the Coliseum between 1942 and 1946. The stucco and wood bathing pavilion was damaged in a fire in July 1946 and was totally destroyed by another blaze the next year. The park site was condemned, and the Coliseum became the West Farms bus depot, operated by MTA Regional Bus Operations.

=== Conversion to city park ===
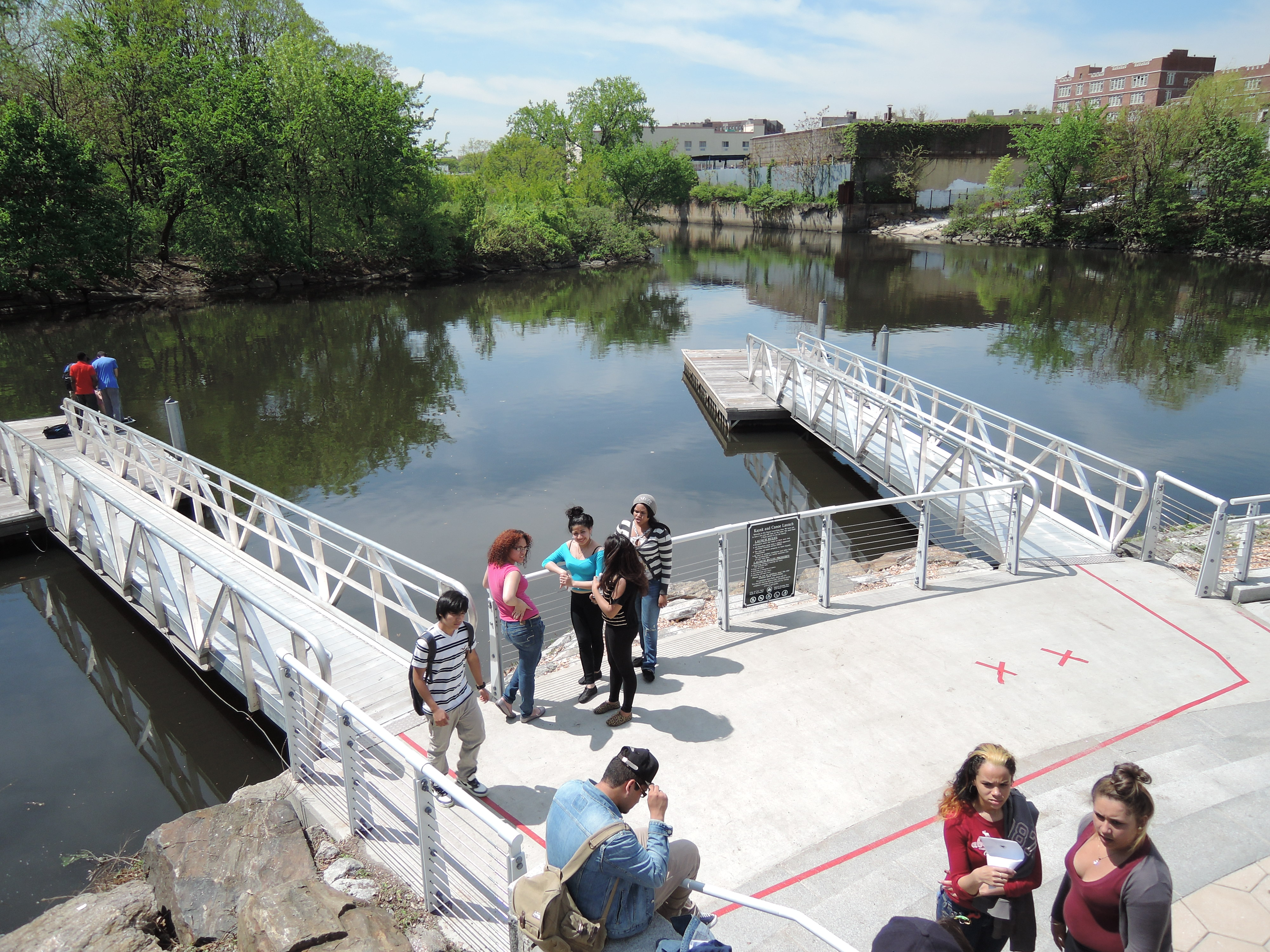
Boat dock on reopening day in 2013

A city park, operated by the New York City Department of Parks and Recreation, was built in the late 1950s as part of the construction of the Sheridan Expressway. The highway was built parallel to the Bronx River on the former site of Starlight Park, which had been condemned to provide the right-of-way for both the Sheridan and Cross Bronx Expressways. As part of the project, a city park with the same name was created in its place, east of the expressway. The city park comprised land west and south of the original site of the amusement park, along both banks of the river.

In the 1990s, after Youth Ministries had made the state aware of pollution on the Bronx River, the New York state government started to clean up the river. Cleanup efforts were delayed when chemicals from an old gas plant at the site were discovered in 2003. As part of the plan to clean up the pollution, the New York State Department of Transportation agreed to rebuild the park and connect it to the Bronx River Greenway, a proposed waterfront path along the Bronx River. In 2013, after a 10-year renovation that cost $18 million, NYC Parks reopened a 13-acre (5.3 ha) section of the public park. Another 11-acre (4.5 ha) segment remained closed because of a disagreement with Amtrak, who owned the Northeast Corridor railroad tracks on the park's eastern edge. A $13 million environmentally-friendly headquarters for the Bronx River Alliance, described in The New York Times as "the greenest building in the South Bronx", opened within the park in 2016.

In 2017, an expansion of the new Starlight Park was announced. As part of this expansion, parts of the park would undergo environmental cleanups. The Phase 2 project would also connect Starlight Park to Concrete Plant Park south of Westchester Avenue via new bridges across the Bronx River and the Northeast Corridor. This coincided with another plan to downgrade Sheridan Expressway to a street-level boulevard so that the surrounding community could more easily access Starlight Park. At the time, the park was only accessible via the East 174th Street bridge that crosses both the expressway and the Bronx River. The project was undertaken to improve pedestrian safety and increase access to both Starlight Park and the Bronx River shoreline. The project to downgrade the Sheridan Expressway began in late 2018 and was completed in December 2019. Contractors renovated the park during the early 2020s. Following a $41 million renovation, NYC Parks opened an 2.7-acre (11,000 m^{2}) section of the park in April 2023.

== Current attractions ==
Current recreational facilities in Starlight Park include four baseball fields (two made of grass and two of asphalt), as well as five checkers tables and eight handball courts. A soccer field overlaps with two of the baseball fields, and a basketball court and playground are located south of the 174th Street bridge over the park. A seasonal canoe launch is located in the park as well. During the summer, the Bronx River Alliance operates a canoeing program called Community Paddle; the program charges a fee on Saturdays but is free on Fridays. Plans for the park, announced in 2017, call for a waterfront greenway, as well as the opening of the parkland on the eastern bank of the Bronx River.

== Former attractions ==
=== Rides ===
Starlight Park amusement park featured fireworks displays, a roller coaster, a swimming pool, and carnival games of skill and chance. The initial attractions were built for the Bronx International Exposition. The swimming pool was marketed as the world's largest saltwater pool, measuring 300 by 350 feet (91 by 107 m) with a capacity of 2,500,000 U.S. gallons (9,500,000 L), and ranging from 0 to 10 feet (0.0 to 3.0 m) deep. The pool contained diving boards and a wave pool machine at the deep end, as well as a 50-by-55-foot (15 by 17 m) beach with sand brought from Rockaway, Queens. The fair also contained a scenic ridable miniature railway on the Bronx River, a "mountain" exhibit with a 65-foot-tall (20 m) waterfall, and a hotel nearby. LaMarcus Adna Thompson built a wooden roller coaster at the site, which featured a dual track. The Eli Bridge Company's Ferris wheel from the Panama–California Exposition was brought over to the Bronx World's Fair. Other attractions included a bathing pavilion that could fit 4,500 people; a convention center; and 15 large pavilions, including Chinese and North Sea-themed pavilions, as well as those for fine arts, liberal arts, and American achievements.

At the end of the 1918 Exposition, the "exhibition hall" became an ice rink and dance hall. When the Exposition Hall was burned down in 1922, it was replaced with two smaller dance halls. By 1927, the park had installed Witching Waves, an undulating flat ride. A Tilt-A-Whirl, a scooter ride, a new Noah's Ark and a "Snap o' the Whip" ride were added in 1929 to draw patrons. Additions in 1931 included a miniature golf course on the site of Witching Waves, as well as a roller rink.

=== Other attractions ===
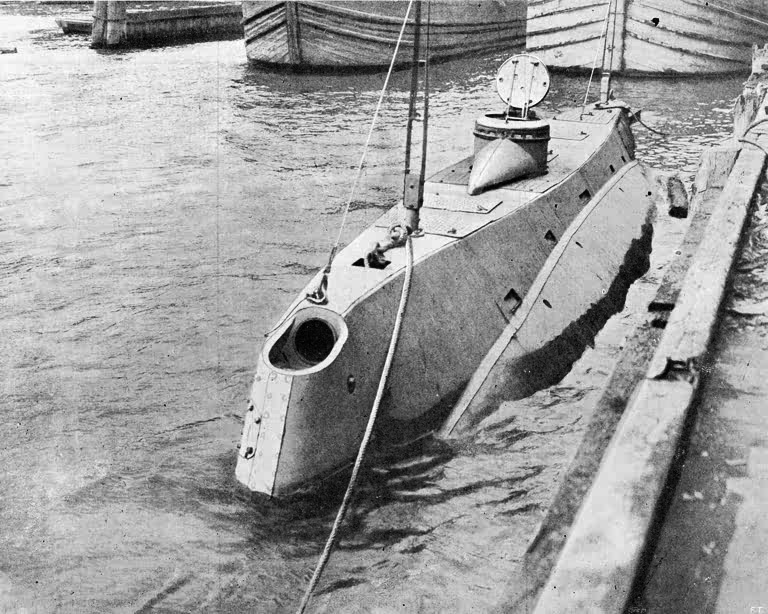
The Holland, exhibited at Starlight Park in 1918

One of the park's most popular attractions was the submarine Holland. After being constructed by Irish-American inventor John Philip Holland in 1888, the Holland became the first submarine commissioned by the United States Navy. She had been maintained by the navy at Norfolk, Virginia, for training purposes until 1914, when she became a museum ship in Philadelphia and Atlantic City, New Jersey. The submarine then moved to Starlight Park in 1918 and remained there until 1932, when she was disassembled for scrap as part of the entire park's demolition.

The 15,000-seat Bronx Coliseum was also located in Starlight Park, and was opened in 1929. It was the home field of the New York Giants soccer team, but also featured numerous other sporting events as well as circuses. The Coliseum also held events when Madison Square Garden in Manhattan was already hosting another event. The stadium was originally built for the 1926 Sesquicentennial Exposition in Philadelphia, Pennsylvania, and was transported to 177th Street and Devoe Avenue in 1928. It came to be called the New York Coliseum, which had no relation to the building with the same name that was later built at Columbus Circle in Manhattan.

=== Other structures ===
The amusement park was also home of the studios of radio station WBNX, which started broadcasting in 1926 and was known as "the official broadcasting station of the New York Coliseum". It was located at Starlight Park until 1932, when the park's partial closure forced the station to relocate.

== Events ==
The first summer music festival in Starlight Park was hosted in 1921 when the Russian Symphony Orchestra Society performed Wagner at the park. Starting in 1926, the park offered free 14-week-long programs of opera music in the summer, in an attempt to give the masses access to high culture at no cost. The first of these operas, Rigoletto, was performed in May 1926. The shows were given in the open air until the Starlight Park Stadium was erected, after which performances were moved to the stadium. On Saturday nights, big-band jazz played for dancers on an outdoor dance floor, giving the park a feeling of "blue collar country club".

Semiprofessional sports teams would compete at Starlight Park's baseball field, added in 1921. Events such as baseball and soccer games, boxing matches, horseshoe throwing, and track and field competitions also drew crowds to Starlight Park. One such match in October 1926 resulted in the death of boxer Joseph Geraghty; his opponent was later cleared of any wrongdoing. After the Coliseum opened in 1929, these events were moved to the stadium.

Children were also able to join a club called the Kiddie Klub, which entitled the member to several designated free-admission days at numerous amusement parks in New York City. Prospective members had to clip three coupons from different newspapers in exchange for a membership pin. The first Kiddie Klub day on July 13, 1921, saw over 20,000 children. The following year, there was a miscommunication about the Kiddie Klub event. On July 12, 1922, the Kiddie Klub free day had been held at Coney Island's Luna Park, but about 50 children showed up at Starlight Park instead. The actual Kiddie Klub day at Starlight Park was held two weeks later.

Vaudeville acts and high diving performances were other popular events hosted in Starlight Park. Toward the late 1920s, in the park's attempt to bring back patrons, more tawdry shows began performing at Starlight Park.

== See also ==
- History of the Bronx
- List of amusement parks
- List of New York City parks

== Sources ==
- Gottlock, Barbara; Gottlock, Wesley (2013). Lost Amusement Parks of New York City: Beyond Coney Island. Arcadia Publishing. ISBN 978-1-62584-556-6.
