= New York Coliseum (1928) =

Arena in the Bronx, New York (1929–1997)

Coordinates: 40°50′17.74″N 73°52′40.93″W

- Interactive map of New York Coliseum
- Former names: Bronx Coliseum; Starlight Park Stadium
- Address: 1100 East 177th Street; New York City; United States
- Owner: City of New York
- Capacity: 16,800 (seated); +2,000 (chairs on field); +2,000 (standing room)

Construction
- Opened: 1929; 97 years ago
- Closed: 1995; 31 years ago
- Demolished: 1997; 29 years ago

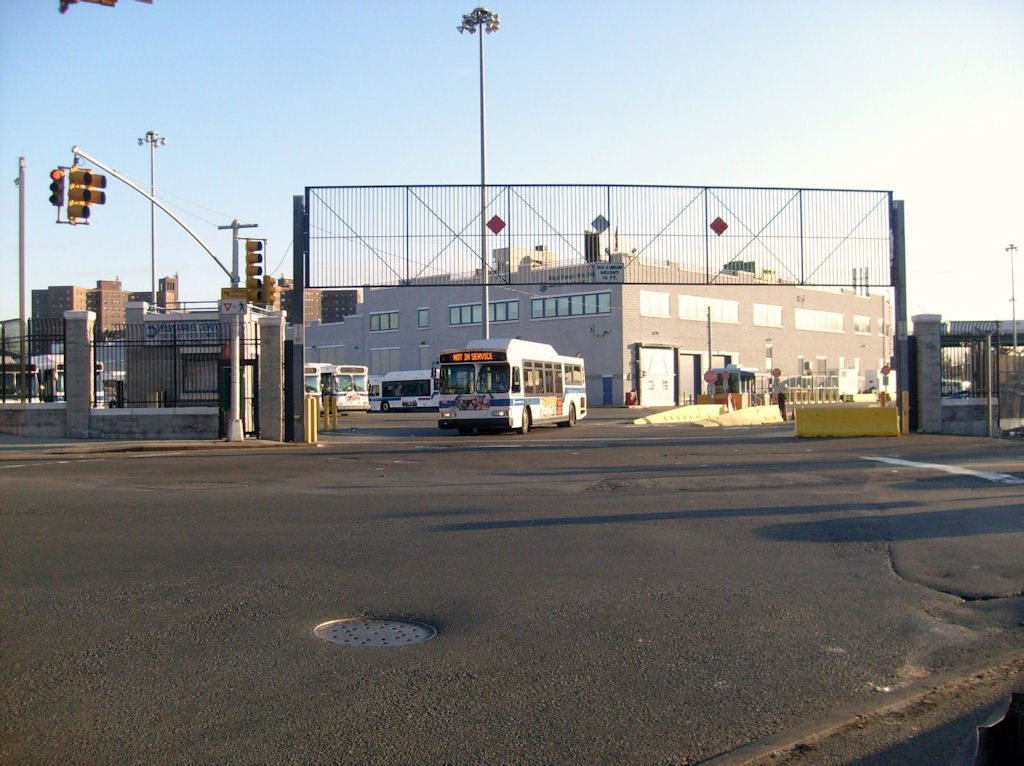
The modified Coliseum as of 2009, now the West Farms Bus Depot

The New York Coliseum, also known as the Bronx Coliseum and Starlight Park Stadium, was a sports venue and auditorium in the West Farms section of the Bronx, New York City. The 105,000-square-foot (9,800 m^{2}) auditorium was originally built for Philadelphia's 1926 Sesquicentennial Exposition, was bought by the Bronx Expositions Corporation and transported in 1929 to add to its Starlight Park at 177th Street and Devoe Avenue.

The 16,800-seat edifice was used for circuses, boxing, political rallies, opera, and midget auto racing. The Coliseum hosted the defunct Eastern Amateur Hockey League's Bronx Tigers franchise for two seasons, 1933–34, and 1937–38. In late 1939, it was the home of the New York Giants of the short-lived National Professional Indoor Baseball League.

The United States Army controlled the building, and the land of adjoining Starlight Park, from 1942 through 1946, after which the Coliseum was used by New York City Transit Authority buses as the Coliseum Depot. In 1995, the Transit Authority closed the depot and demolished it in 1997. A new building was constructed on the site, incorporating some of the façade of the Coliseum Depot. It opened in 2003 as the West Farms Bus Depot.
