= Concrete Plant Park =

Public park in the Bronx, New York

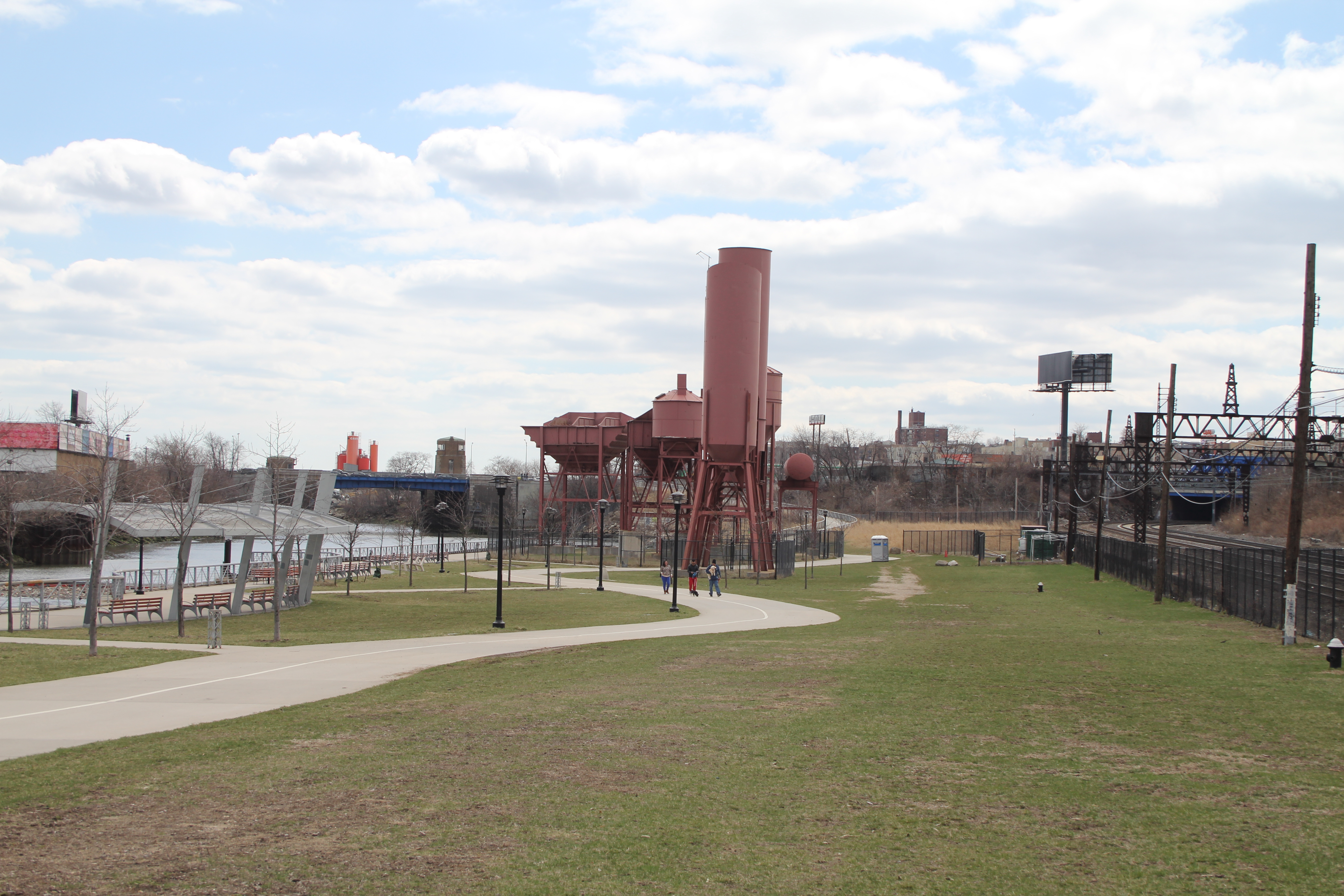
- Concrete Plant Park, looking south
- Interactive map of Concrete Plant Park
- Type: Public park
- Location: The Bronx, New York City
- Coordinates: 40.825201°N 73.885117°W
- Area: 7.39 acres (2.99 ha)
- Created: 2009
- Operator: New York City Department of Parks and Recreation
- Status: Open all year
- Water: Bronx River
- Public transit: New York City Subway: Whitlock Avenue, Simpson Street; New York City Bus: Bx4, Bx4A, Bx11, Bx27
- Website: www.nycgovparks.org/parks/concrete-plant-park

Concrete Plant Park is a public park in the Longwood section of the Bronx, New York City. It consists of 7.39 acres (2.99 ha) located on the west bank of the Bronx River between Westchester Avenue and Bruckner Boulevard. The centerpiece and namesake of the park is a group of restored structures from the concrete plant which once occupied its site. It is maintained by the New York City Department of Parks and Recreation.

== History and description ==
The Transit-Mix Corporation operated a concrete plant on the site from the late 1940s through its abandonment in 1987, according to NYC Parks, although the city's land records indicate the property was foreclosed for non-payment of taxes in 1981. In 2000, the property was transferred to NYC Parks, which formed a partnership with community organizations, including the Bronx River Alliance, to design and construct the park. The city stabilized the old structures from the abandoned plant, cleared tons of debris, and constructed other park facilities. The park was opened to the public in 2009.

Besides the restored concrete plant structures, which have fences around them, the park includes a walk along the Bronx River, grassy lawns, seating (some of it under a small metal canopy), a "reading circle" of concrete chair-like structures, and a paved bicycle and pedestrian trail that is part of the developing Bronx River Greenway. The park's north entrance is on Westchester Avenue just east of Whitlock Avenue, and its south entrance is on Bruckner Boulevard west of Bronx River Avenue.

The ruined Westchester Avenue station, which was built in 1908 and designed by architect Cass Gilbert, stands near the park's northern entrance, where it is partly suspended over Amtrak's busy Northeast Corridor. One proposal to save the station from demolition involves moving part of it to a pier in the park. However to date no source of funding for the project has been identified.

== Gallery ==
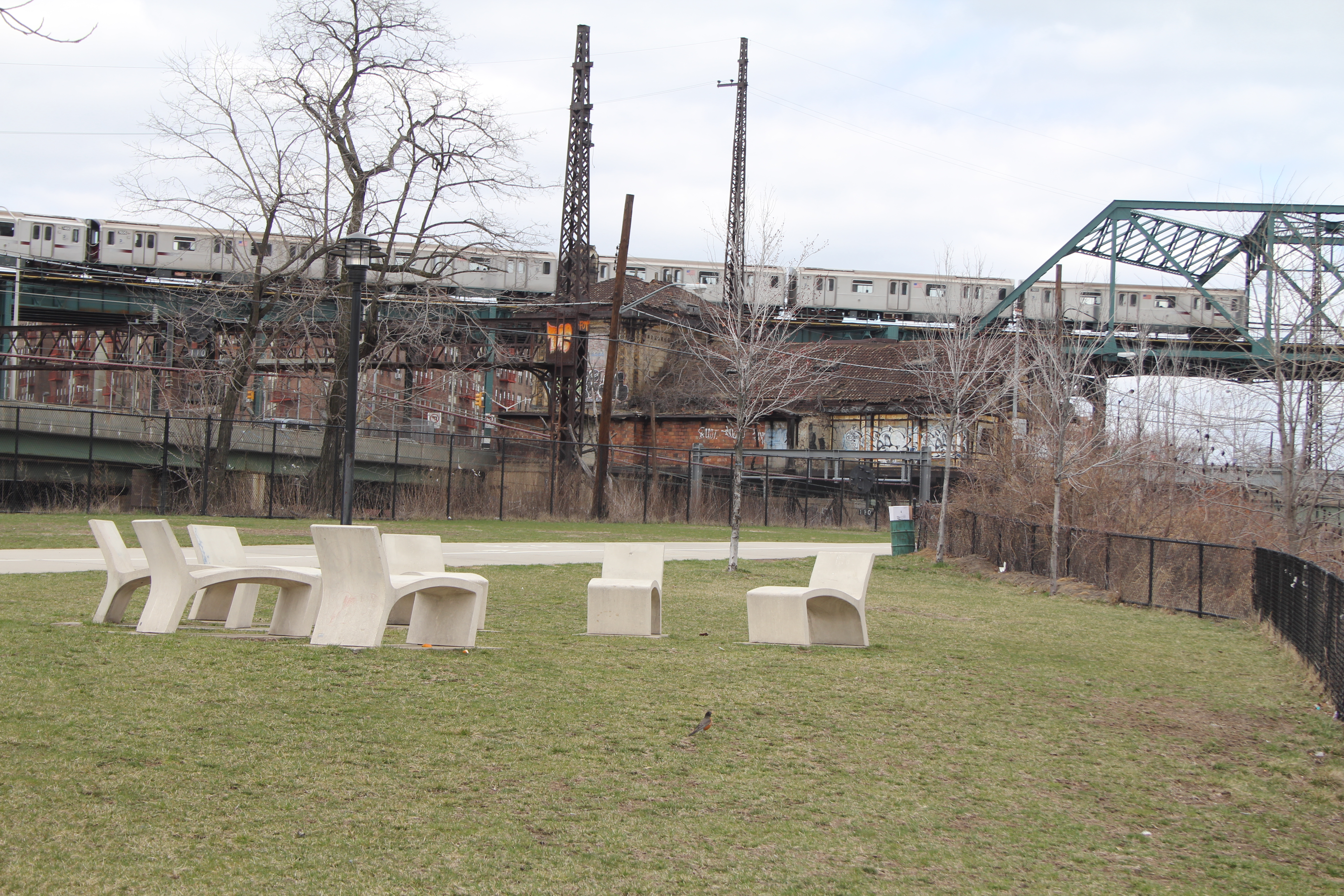
Reading circle, with Westchester Avenue station ruin and a New York City Subway train on 6 train service in the background

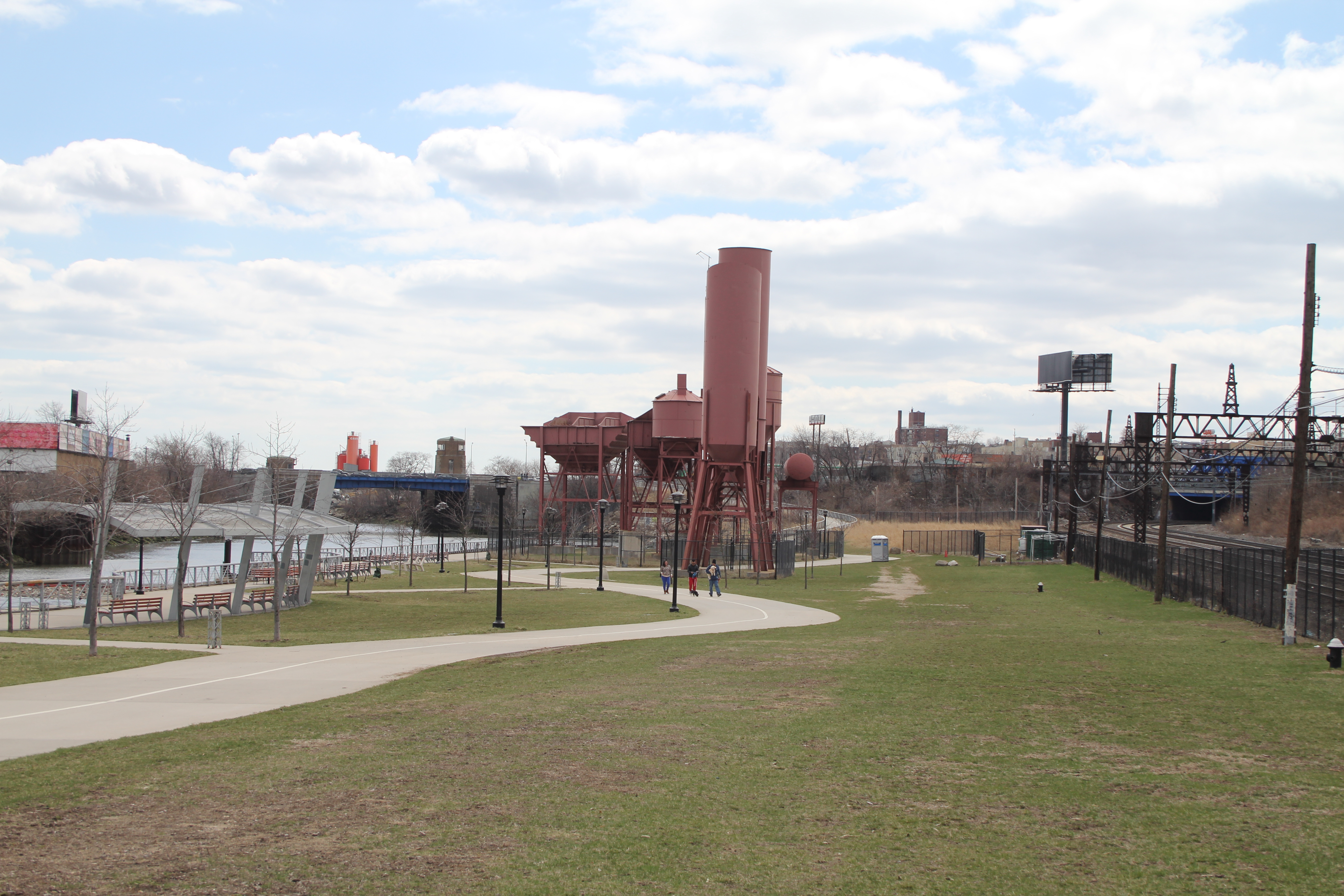
Looking south towards the concrete plant structures. Bronx River is on the left and Northeast Corridor on the right

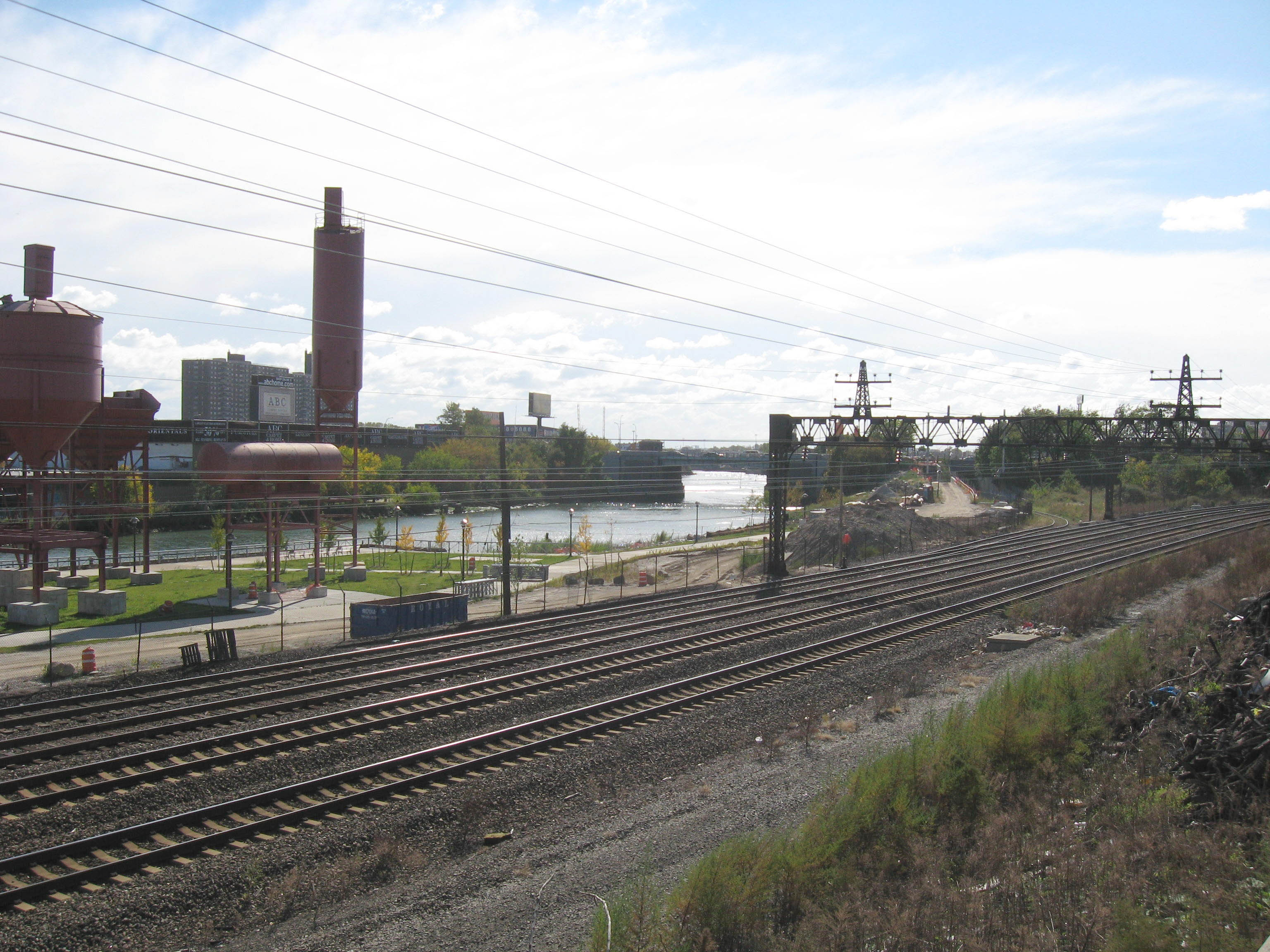
A view of the park from across the tracks
