= Ales Groupe =

French cosmetics and fragrances company

- Type: Private
- Industry: Cosmetics, fragrance
- Founded: 1969
- Founder: Patrick Alès
- Headquarters: Paris, France
- Area served: Worldwide
- Key people: Romain Alès (Chairman, from 2018)
- Products: Haircare, dermocosmetics, fragrances
- Brands: Phyto, Lierac, Caron (until 2018)

Ales Groupe is a cosmetics and fragrances company based in Paris, France. The company has been founded by Patrick Alès, a hair stylist, dating back before 1969 when he created Laboratoires Phytosolba, a botanical hair care brand formulated with plants.

== History ==
The company was founded in 1969 by Patrick Alès, a hairdresser who invented the technique of blow-drying in 1964, after his own salon had gone bankrupt.

It began operating under the name Phytosolba Laboratories, supported by a loan from Jacques Dessange, producing and selling plant-based hair treatments (phytotherapy) in pharmacies under the brand Phyto.

In 1979, the L'Oréal group purchased 49% of the company's capital, allowing it to acquire the plant-based cosmetics brand Lierac, created four years earlier. In 1983, Phytosolba Laboratories acquired the Laboratoires de médecine végétale.

The group:s international expansion began in the early 1990s, accelerating its growth.

In 1995, following a successful lawsuit against L'Oréal, Patrick Alès bought back its shares for 90 million francs, largely through debt financing.

On 15 October 1996, the Ales group was renamed Phyto-Lierac and went public on the Second Market of the Paris Stock Exchange. This operation allowed the founder and his family to sell 15% of the capital and raise 60 million francs. At that time, revenue came primarily from high-end hair products (57%, under the Phytosolba brand, later renamed Phyto) and dermocosmetic products (41%, under the Lierac brand sold in pharmacies).

On 4 June 1997, Phyto-Lierac issued a 220-million-franc convertible bond to finance acquisitions, In 1997, the group purchased the Ducastel laboratory, which generated 31 million francs in revenue from professional hair-coloring products.

In 1998, Phyto-Lierac acquired Parfums Caron, a 50-employee company that had posted losses of 45 million francs over the previous three years. According to La Tribune, the purchase price was between 40 and 95 million francs.

After repaying its convertible bonds in January 2004, Phyto-Lierac, by then renamed Ales Groupe, launched a capital increase of €19.4 million. While exports represented only 30% of revenue in 1996, they accounted for 50% in 2004.

In 2008, Patrick Alès stepped down from the group's operational management. In 2010, the company’s shares were transferred to Alternext.

In the early 2010s, Ales Groupe underwent several management reshuffles. In 2012, the company reported "the first losses in its history".

In February 2018, Ales Groupe was in a difficult financial situation, and Patrick Alès, chairman of the supervisory board, was replaced by his son Romain Alès.

On 18 October 2018, Ales Groupe sold Parfums Caron for just under 30 million euros.

In May 2019, Avila, the holding company of Ales Groupe, carried out a capital increase of 20 million euros subscribed by a new investor, Co-Capital, already an international distribution partner of the group. Co-Capital held 40% of Avila, with the founding family holding the rest. At the end of the same month, founder Patrick Alès died.

By late 2019, the situation worsened, as a banking covenant was no longer met, and the amount of callable debt reached 90 million euros. On 29 June 2020, trading of Ales Groupe shares on Euronext Growth was suspended.

In summer 2020, the company - heavily loss-making despite the capital gain from the sale of Parfums Caron - entered receivership. The COVID-19 pandemic caused a halt in distribution across Europe and the United States, precipitating the collapse of the group already weakened for years. On 24 September 2020, the commercial court approved the sale of the cosmetics division (70% of group activity) to the holding Impala of Jacques Veyrat for 13.5 million euros. The haircare division was taken over by its managers.
