= Bronx River Alliance =

Nonprofit organization based in the Bronx, New York

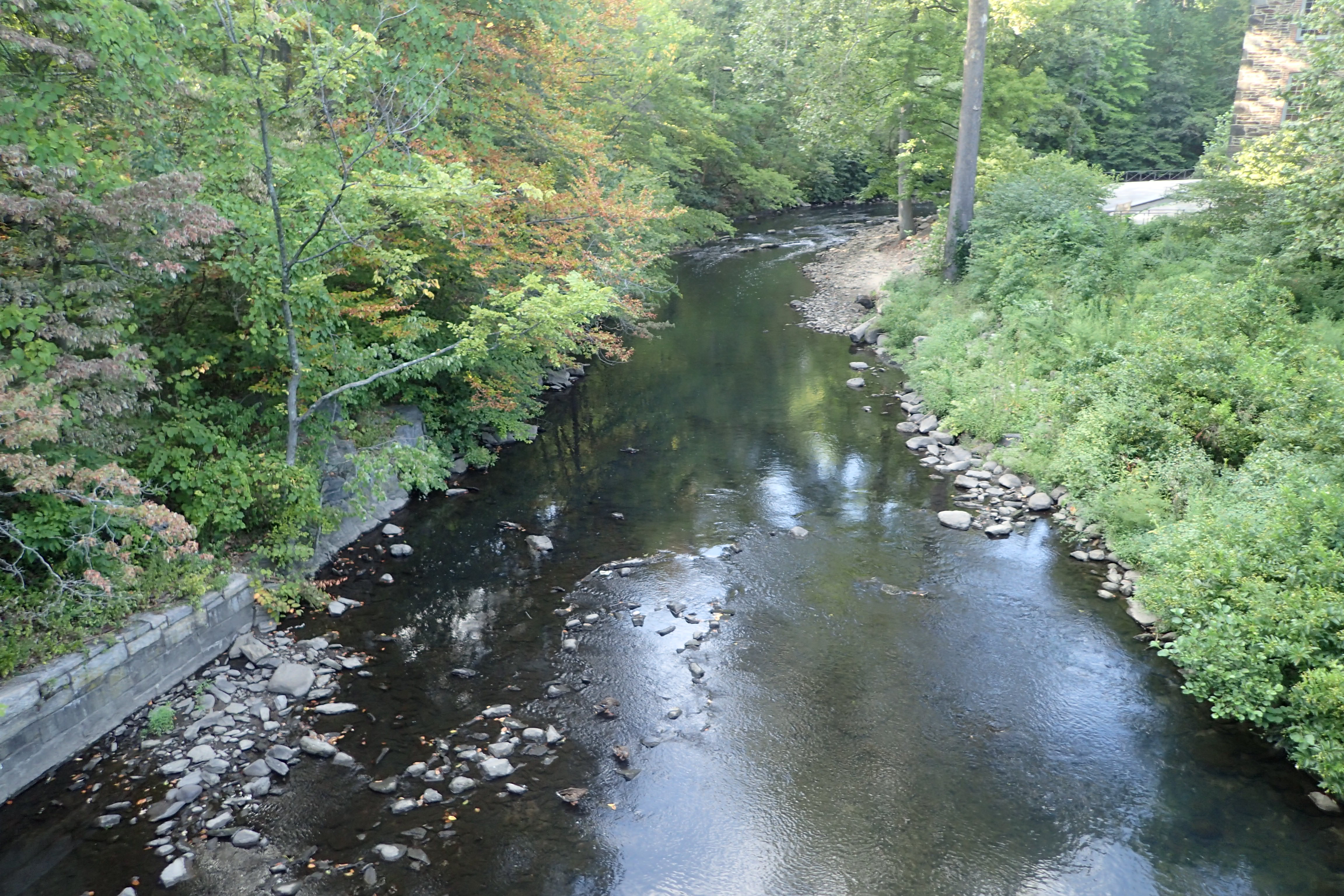
- Founded: 1974
- Purpose: the health of the Bronx River
- Location: The Bronx, New York, NY, United States
- Region served: Bronx River and surrounding communities
- Website: https://bronxriver.org/
- Formerly called: Bronx River Working Group; Bronx River Restoration Project

Bronx River Alliance is a non-profit organization dedicated to conserving, preserving, and improving the health of the Bronx River and surrounding environments.

== Organization history ==
The Bronx River Restoration Project (BXRR), founded by Ruth Anderberg in 1974, grew into the Bronx River Working Group a group with the aim to be a "voice for the river." In 1997, the Bronx River Working Group expanded its efforts to include community groups including government agencies, businesses, and schools. In 2001, the Bronx River Working Group along with Bronx River Restoration headed by Nancy Wallace officially founded the Bronx River Alliance.

=== Bronx River House ===
In 2016, after sharing an office for many years with the Parks Department on the Bronx River Parkway, the alliance opened the Bronx River House, a riverfront home in Starlight Park near 174th Street. The Bronx River House, a parks department building, serves as a base for the Bronx River Alliance's 20-member staff. Additionally, the building stores canoes and kayaks, serves as a laboratory for studying the river environment, while also providing space and programming to school and community groups.

== Conservation work ==
Since its founding in 2001, the alliance has led in the clean-up and transformation of the river from polluted and abandoned to a source of pride and recreation, providing public parks, hiking and bike trails. Additionally, the alliance assists in providing boats to the public so they can paddle in the river and experience it firsthand. Throughout its history, the alliance has partnered with other environmental organizations including the Natural Areas Conservancy to restore the environment and trails along the river.
