= Bronx River =

River in New York, United States

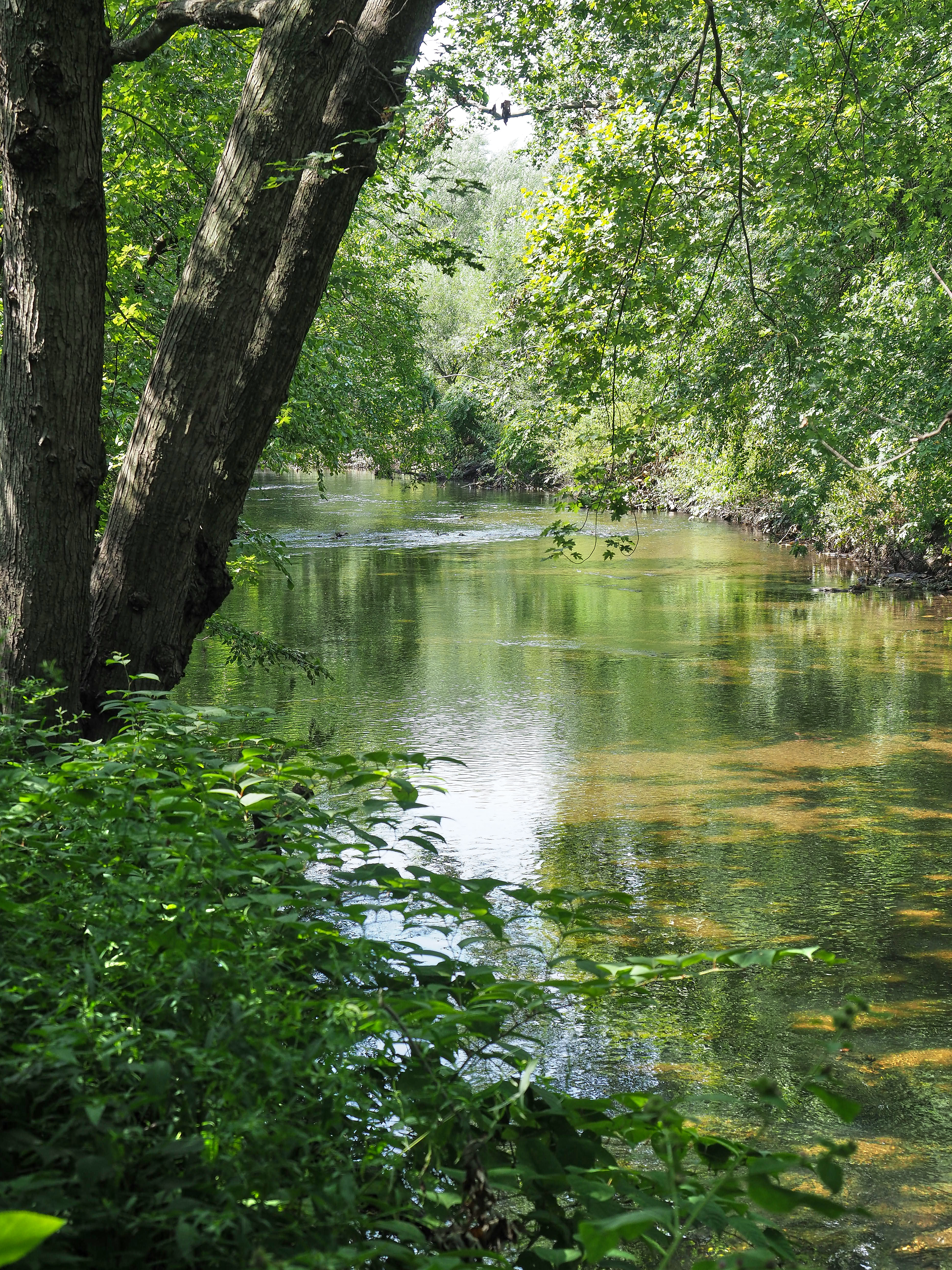
- The Bronx River in Shoelace Park, in The Bronx.

Location
- Country: United States
- State: New York
- Region: Hudson Valley
- Counties: Westchester and Bronx
- Municipalities: Mount Pleasant, White Plains, Greenburgh, Scarsdale, Eastchester, Yonkers, Bronx

Physical characteristics
- Source: Kensico Reservoir
  - location: New Castle
  - coordinates: 41°4′27″N 73°46′0″W
  - elevation: 354 ft (108 m)
- Mouth: East River
  - location: Hunts Point and Soundview in The Bronx
  - coordinates: 40°48′11″N 73°51′49.0″W
  - elevation: 0 ft (0 m)
- Length: 24 mi (39 km)
- Basin size: 38.4 sq mi (99 km^{2})
- Discharge
  - location: Bronx Botanical Gardens
  - maximum: 3,460 cu ft/s (98 m^{3}/s)

Basin features
- Tributaries
  - right: Troublesome Brook; Grassy Sprain Brook

The Bronx River (/brɒŋks/) is a river approximately 24 miles (39 km) long, flowing through southeastern New York in the United States and draining an area of 38.4 square miles (99 km^{2}). It is named after colonial settler Jonas Bronck.

It originally rose in what is now the Kensico Reservoir, in Westchester County north of New York City, on a hill about 650 feet (200 m) above sea level in what is now New Castle, New York. The river originated in an area the Weckquaesgeek called Quaropes, which means White Marshes. It was fed by the Fulton Brook, Manhattan Park Brook, Davis Brook, and Tompkins Brook. With the construction of the Kensico Dam in 1885, however, the river was cut off from its natural headwaters and today a small tributary stream originating from the reservoir is its source. The Bronx River flows south past White Plains, then south-southwest through the northern suburbs in New York, passing through Edgemont, Tuckahoe, Eastchester, and Bronxville. In the area known as the Aquehung, it is fed by Harts Brook and the north and south Fox Meadow Brooks. At Tuckahoe, it is fed by Troublesome Brook. At Bronxville, it is fed by Sprain Brook, its longest tributary system, which originates at Greenburgh Town Park.

The river divides Westchester County into eastern and western areas, forming the border between the large cities of Yonkers and Mount Vernon, and flows into the northern end of the Bronx, where it divides East Bronx from West Bronx, southward through Bronx Park, New York Botanical Garden, and the Bronx Zoo and continues through neighborhoods of the South Bronx. It empties into the East River, a tidal strait connected to Long Island Sound, between the Soundview and Hunts Point neighborhoods.

== Etymology ==
Prior to European settlement, the Bronx River Valley was known as Laaphawachking-"the place of stringing lakes."

In the 17th century, the river—called by the natives "Aquehung"—served as a boundary between loosely associated bands under sachems of the informal confederacy of the Wecquaesgeek. Europeanized as the Wappinger, the east bank of the river was the boundary for the Siwanoy, clammers and fishermen. The same line was retained when manors were granted to the Dutch and the English.

The Algonkian significance of the name is variously reported. The acca- element, as represented in the Long Island place-name Accabonac, was deformed into the more familiar, suitably watery European morpheme aque-.

The tract purchased by Jonas Bronck, a Swedish immigrant, in 1639 lay between the Harlem River and the river that came to be called "Bronck's river".

== Pollution ==
During the 19th and 20th centuries, the river became a natural sewer into which industrial waste was poured every day. An early mill on the industrialized river was the Lorillard Snuff Mill, preserved in the grounds of the New York Botanical Garden. With the decline of manufacturing in the area, the river continued to receive water pollution from the communities that lined its banks. In December 1948, flow of the Bronx River was changed to eliminate a curve in its course in Bronxville, to create land on the old riverbed on which to construct an addition to Lawrence Hospital. During the excavations a large sand bar was uncovered where sand had accumulated at the bend over hundreds of years and made a sandy beach.

In the 21st century, environmental groups including the Bronx River Alliance proposed to return the river to its original state as a clean waterway. The river became a favorite project of U.S. Representative José Serrano, who secured US$14.6 million in federal funding to support the rehabilitation of the waterway, into which some Westchester towns continued to discharge raw sewage intermittently, as sanitary sewer overflows, as late as 2006. Under a November 2006, agreement, the municipalities of Scarsdale, White Plains, Mount Vernon and Greenburgh agreed to stop dumping sewage in the Bronx River by May 2007.

Urban runoff pollution continues to be a serious problem for the river. The Bronx River Watershed Coalition, a partnership of local and state agencies, citizen groups and non-profit organizations, have developed watershed management plans to reduce stormwater pollution and improve water quality.

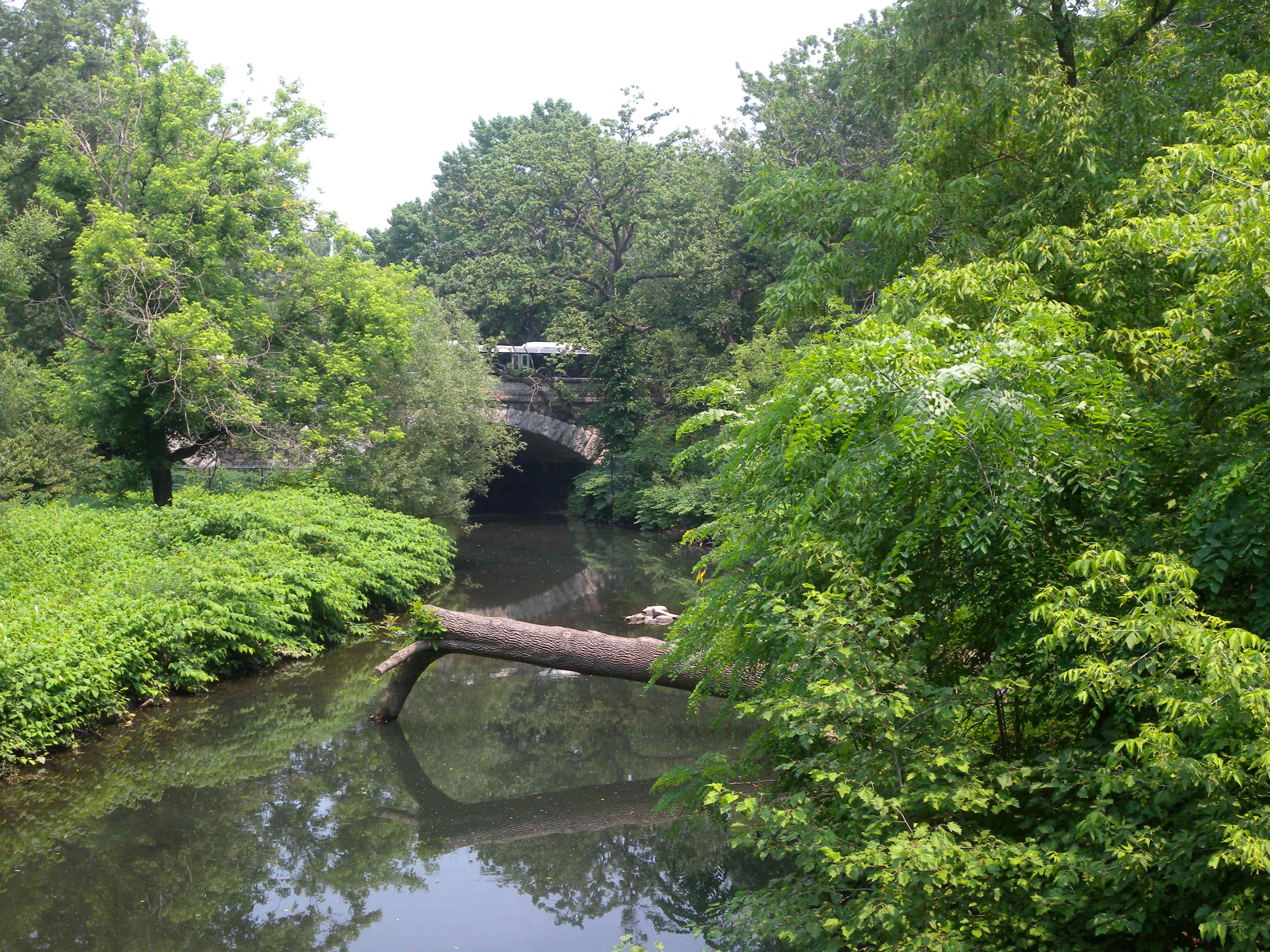
Entering the Botanical Garden

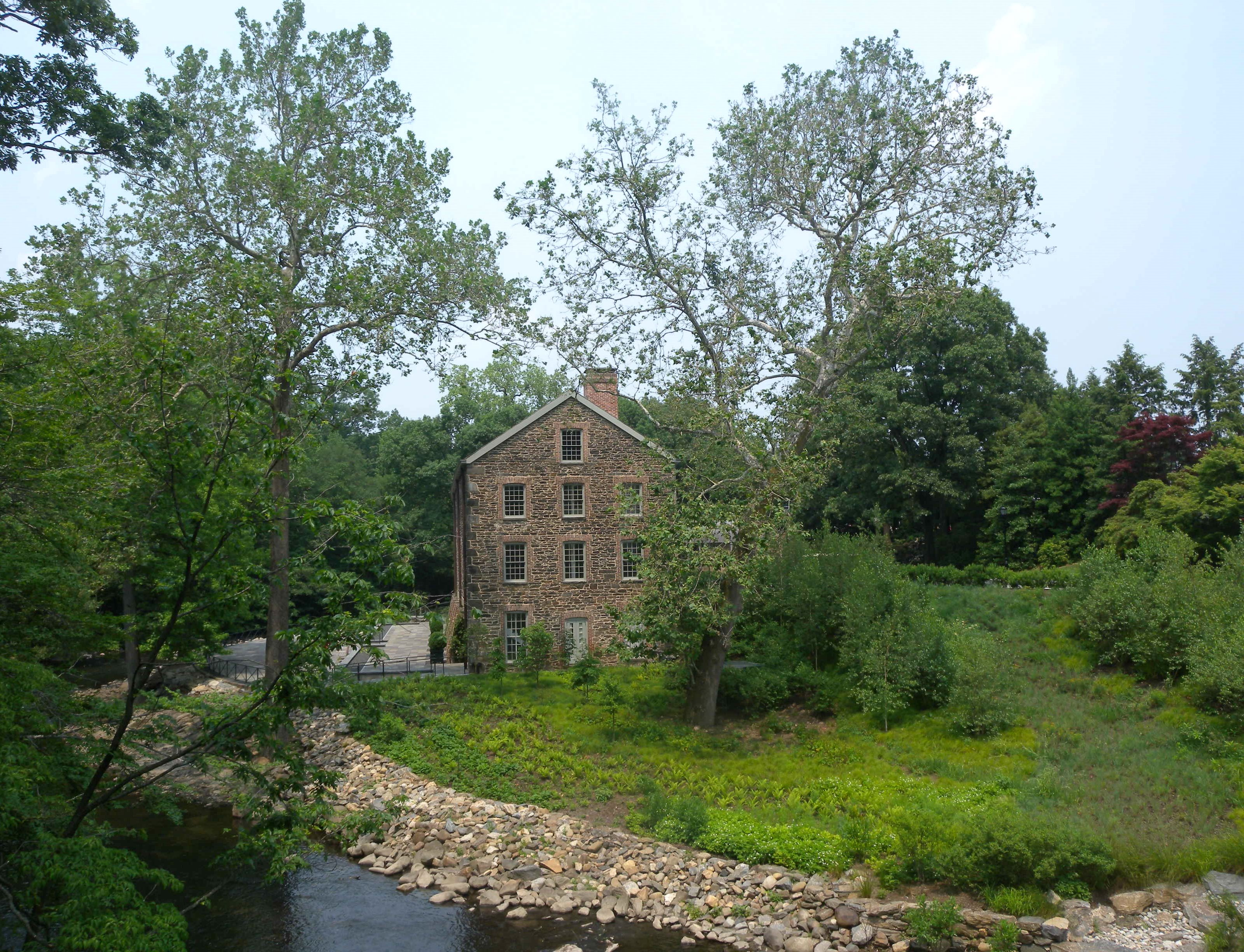
Lorillard Snuff Mill

== Ecology ==
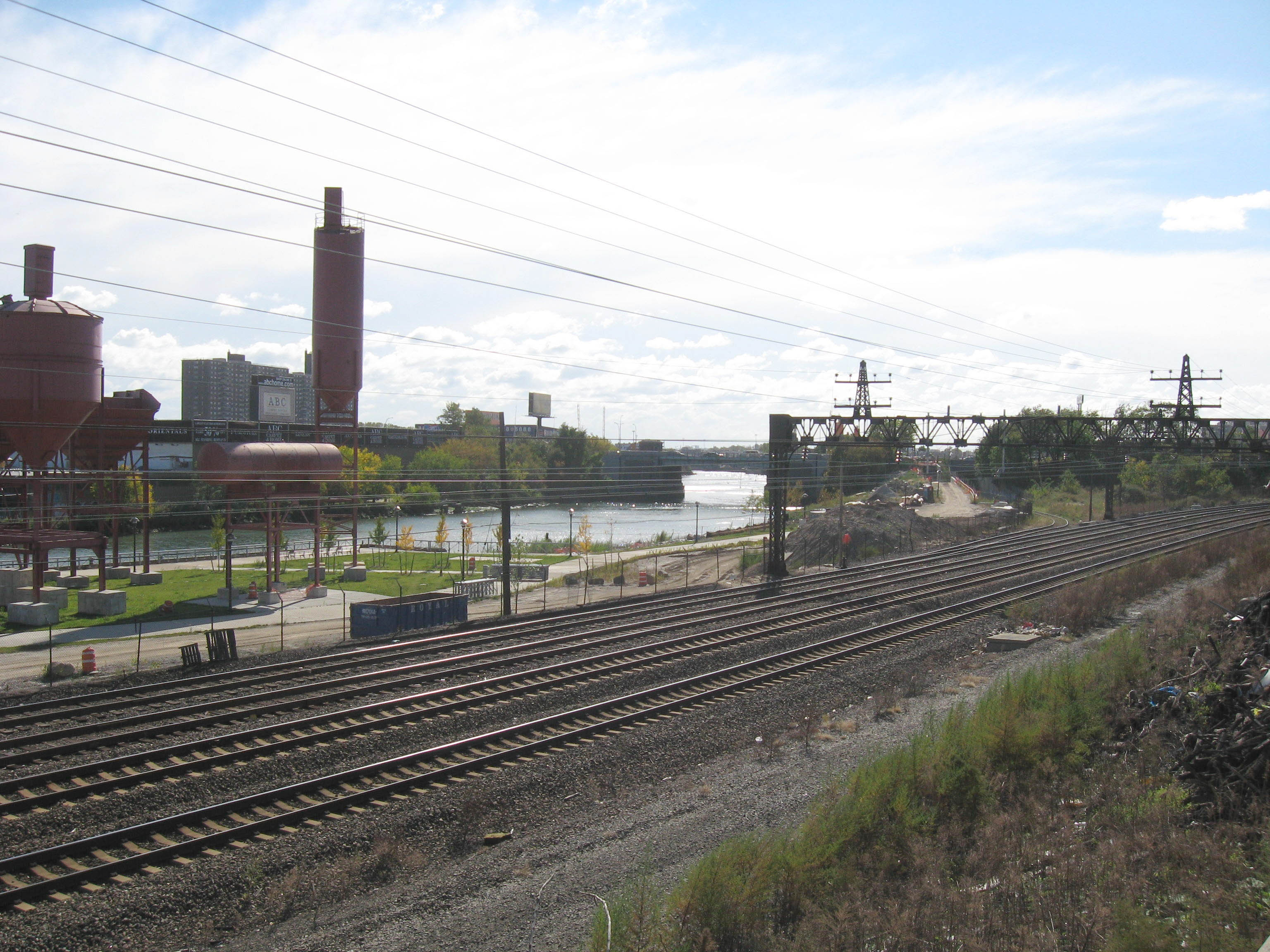
A rail line runs along the river

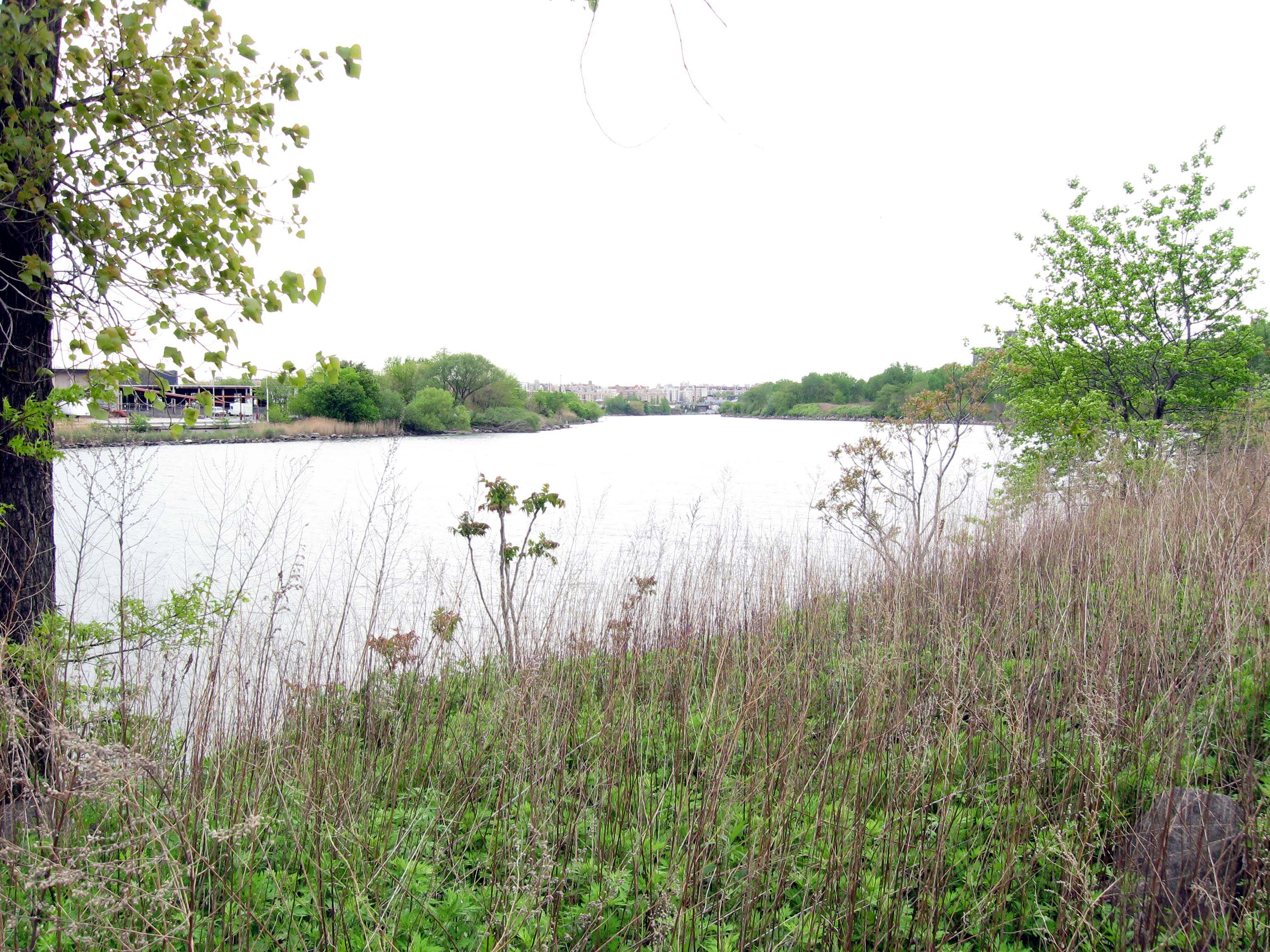
The Bronx River near its mouth

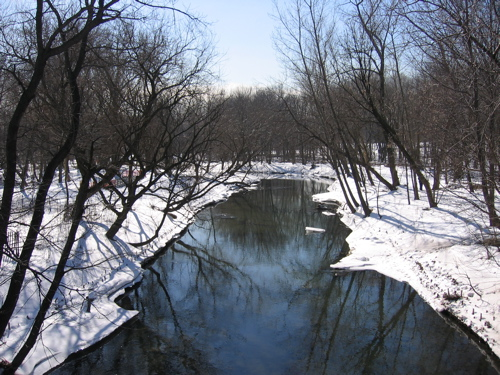
The river in winter

Local alewife were released in the river in March 2006. They were taken from a coastal tributary in nearby Connecticut. The alewife spawn in the river's headwaters. Their offspring spend the summer in the river, migrate out to sea in the fall, and in three to five years return, like all anadromous fish, to their spawning grounds. Stocking was repeated annually for the following five years, to build up the new resident population.

The fish, among a group called "river herring," feed low on the food-chain and help reduce eutrophication. Several adult alewife were found below the first dam on the river in April 2009. An analysis revealed they were 3 years old, with the assumption of scientists being that these were descendants of the alewife released 3 years before in March 2006.

The next step will be to erect fish ladders, aka. fish passageways over the 3 dams lowest on the river, allowing the alewife access to a portion of the river with more suitable spawning habitat. In 2015 a fish passageway was built at the 182nd Street dam.

In February 2007 biologists with the Wildlife Conservation Society, which operates the Zoo, spotted a beaver (Castor canadensis) in the river. "There has not been a sighting of a beaver lodge or a beaver in New York City for over 200 years. It sounds fantastic, but one of the messages that comes out of this is if you give wildlife a chance it will come back," said John Calvelli, a spokesman for the Society. The beaver is named Jose Serrano, after the Congressman, and was sighted below the East Tremont bridge at Drew Gardens as recently as June 2009.

Beavers had not lived in New York City since the early 19th century, when trappers extirpated them completely from the state. In the summer of 2010 a second beaver joined Jose, doubling the beaver population in New York City. Beaver were once important to the city's economy. A pair of beaver appear on the city's official seal and flag.

A pod of dolphins visited the river in January 2023.

In June 2026, a motion-activated camera placed by a scientist affiliated to the Bronx Zoo captured an otter, the first such sighting in over 100 years.

== Recreational amenities ==
Along much of its length in Westchester County and the northern Bronx the river is paralleled by the Bronx River Parkway. It has a bicycle path from Bronxville to the Kensico Dam plaza. The Bronx River Greenway project proposes a unified management plan for the narrow ribbon of riverside green spaces in the 8 miles (13 km) in which the river passes through Westchester County and the Bronx, as part of the East Coast Greenway. It includes Concrete Plant Park on the right bank, below Westchester Avenue and Starlight Park above there. Construction on the Bronx River Greenway started in October 2016.

In the South Bronx, the river has become a popular destination for urban canoeing in New York City. It bisects Bronx Park and the Bronx Zoo. A monorail built in the late 20th century takes zoo visitors over the river to an exhibit of Asian animals on the left bank, with a narration presenting the river as the Irrawaddy.

Shoelace Park is a one-mile long linear park on the east bank of the Bronx River, from 211th to 231st Street in the Wakefield and Williamsbridge areas of the Bronx. Officially named Bronx River Park, it is more commonly known as Shoelace Park because of its shape. The park was renovated in 2020 to create bicycle and pedestrian paths over what was the original roadbed of the Bronx River Parkway. A small pier at 219th street provides access to the river for canoes and kayaks.

== Waterfalls, culverts, storm water outfalls, and inlets ==
The fragmentation of the Bronx River by dams has eliminated diadromous species from the river system, and as human development has progressed across the Bronx river, historic fish migration routes have been severed. According to the NYC Department of Environmental Protection: "At the beginning of the 18th Century, roughly 12 water mills were producing paper, pottery, flour, tapestries, and snuff along the Bronx River." Several identified blockages, according to a 2004 NYC Parks report, include the 182nd Street Dam, the Bronx Zoo Dam, the Snuff Mill Dam, and the Westchester dams. As a result of these long term blockages, NYC parks did not expect fish to return to these migration routes, requiring the release of fish in historical spawning areas after fish passage remediation. In 2011, New York City parks began the process of adding a 1.5 million passage to Bronx Park, which is adjacent to the Bronx River. The project, including dam repair in addition to construction of the fish ladder, was slated to be one of three fish ladders that were to be installed across the Bronx River.

Restoration programs based on fishway construction and hatcheries may have sustained remnant populations, but large-scale restoration has not been achieved.

This is a partial listing, listed north to south:

1. Inlet. Just south of Butler Road, Scarsdale
2. Waterfall. Across from Brayton Road, north of the Hartsdale MetroNorth Station
3. Waterfall. Across from Olmstead Road, north of the Scarsdale MetroNorth Station
4. Waterfall. Scarsdale MetroNorth Station
5. Storm water outfall. West side of river.
6. Storm water outfall. East side of river.
7. Waterfall. Just north of Tuckahoe MetroNorth Station
8. Waterfall. Lillian and Amy Goldman Stone Mill AKA The Old Snuff Mill. As of 2015 there are plans to build a fish passage here.
9. Waterfall. (Bronx Zoo Dam) Opposite Mitsubishi Riverwalk. As of 2015 there are plans to build a fish passage here.
10. Waterfall. 182nd Street As of 2015 a fish passage exists at this dam.

== See also ==
- Bronx Kill
- List of New York rivers
