= New York Penn Station =

Major rail hub in New York City

Pennsylvania Station New York, NY
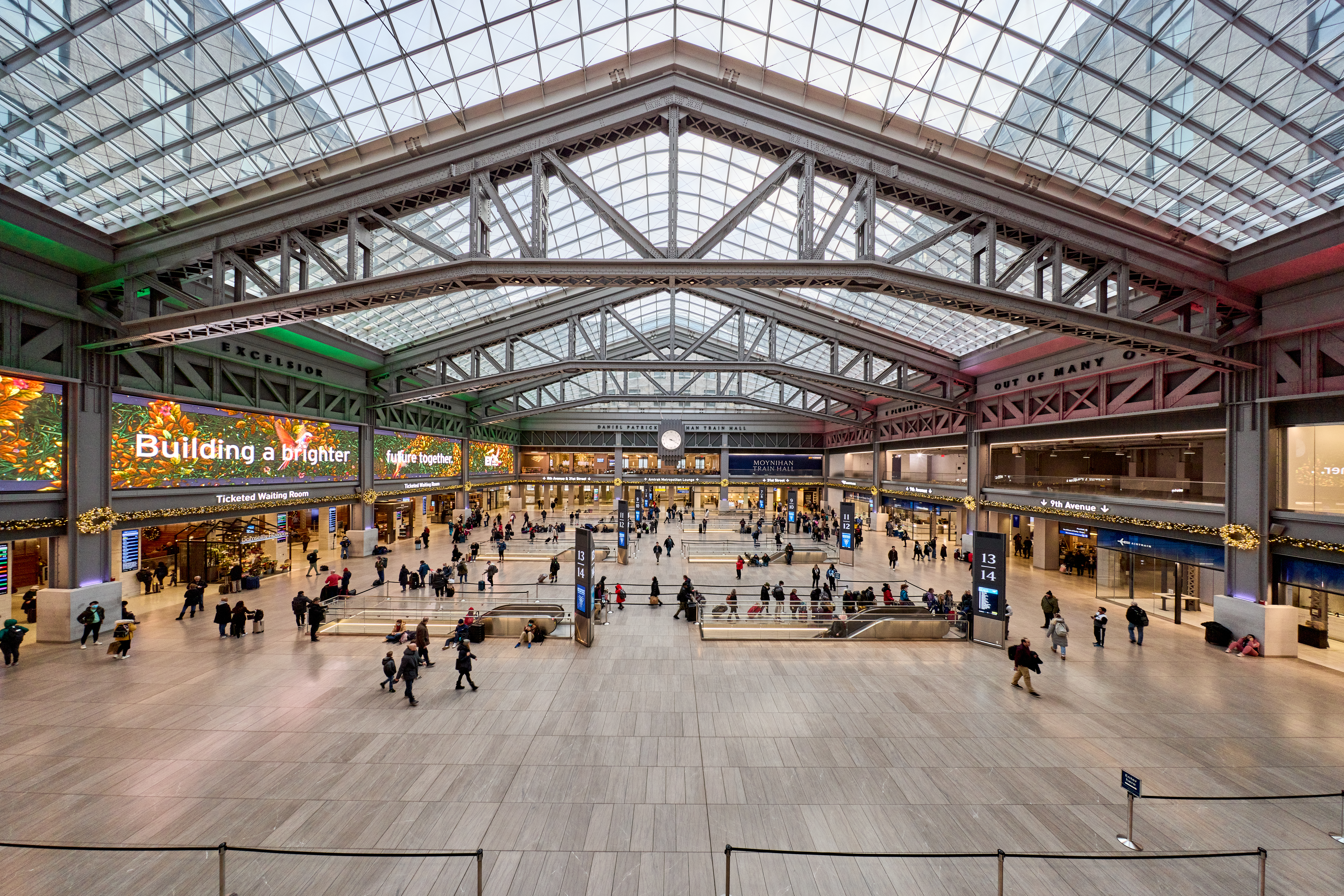
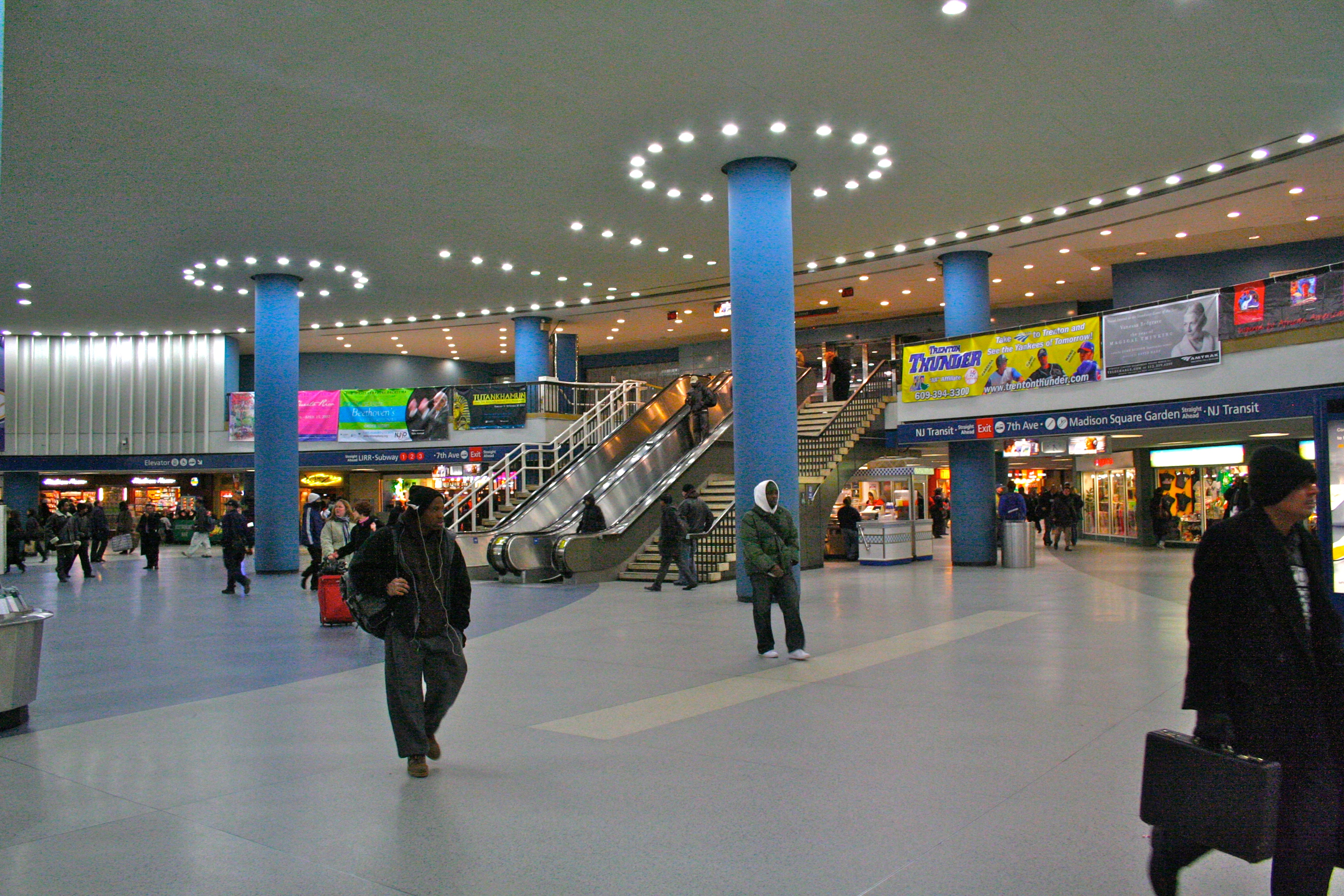
- Moynihan Train Hall (top) and the station's main concourse (below)

General information
- Location: Bounded by 7th & 9th avenues and 31st & 33rd streets Midtown Manhattan, New York City; United States
- Coordinates: 40°45′02″N 73°59′38″W
- Owner: Amtrak
- Lines: Northeast Corridor (Hell Gate Line); Empire Corridor (West Side Line)
- Platforms: 11 island platforms
- Tracks: 21
- Connections: New York City Subway: at 34th Street–Penn Station; at 34th Street–Penn Station; PATH: JSQ–33, HOB–33, JSQ–33 (via HOB) at 33rd Street; NYCT Bus: M7, M20, M34 SBS, M34A SBS, SIM23, SIM24 MTA Bus: Q32; Flixbus: Eastern Shuttle; Tripper Bus; Vamoose Bus

Construction
- Structure type: Underground
- Accessible: Yes

Other information
- Station code: Amtrak: NYP; LIRR: NYK; Via Rail: NEWY
- IATA code: ZYP
- Fare zone: Zone 1 (LIRR); Zone 1 (NJ Transit)
- Website: moynihantrainhall.nyc

History
- Opened: 1910; 116 years ago
- Rebuilt: 1963–1968; 58 years ago

Passengers
Amtrak
- FY 2025: 13,037,414 annually
LIRR
- 2017: 69,722,560 annually; based on average arrivals and departures
NJ Transit Rail Operations
- 2025: 61,559 (average weekday)
- Rank: 1 of 153
Services
| Preceding station | Amtrak | Following station |
|---|---|---|
| Newark Penn toward Washington, D.C. | Acela | Stamford toward Boston South |
| Newark Penn toward Washington, D.C. | Vermonter | Stamford toward St. Albans |
| Newark Penn toward Norfolk, Newport News or Roanoke | Northeast Regional | New Rochelle toward Boston South or Springfield |
| Yonkers toward Montreal | Adirondack | Terminus |
| Yonkers toward Pittsfield | Berkshire Flyer (seasonal) | Terminus |
| Newark Penn toward Chicago | Cardinal | Terminus |
| Newark Penn toward Charlotte | Carolinian | Terminus |
| Newark Penn toward New Orleans | Crescent | Terminus |
| Yonkers toward Niagara Falls, New York | Empire Service | Terminus |
| Yonkers toward Burlington | Ethan Allen Express | Terminus |
| Newark Penn toward Harrisburg | Keystone Service | Terminus |
| Croton–Harmon toward Chicago | Lake Shore Limited | Terminus |
| Yonkers toward Toronto | Maple Leaf | Terminus |
| Newark Penn toward Savannah | Palmetto | Terminus |
| Newark Penn toward Pittsburgh | Pennsylvanian | Terminus |
| Newark Penn toward Miami | Silver Meteor | Terminus |
| Preceding station | Long Island Rail Road | Following station |
| Terminus | Port Washington Branch | Woodside toward Port Washington |
| Terminus | Hempstead Branch | Woodside toward Hempstead |
| Terminus | Port Jefferson Branch | Woodside toward Huntington or Port Jefferson |
| Terminus | Oyster Bay Branch limited service | Jamaica toward Oyster Bay |
| Terminus | Ronkonkoma Branch | Woodside toward Ronkonkoma |
| Terminus | Montauk Branch | Jamaica toward Montauk |
| Terminus | Cannonball summers only | Westhampton toward Montauk |
| Terminus | Far Rockaway Branch | Woodside toward Far Rockaway |
| Terminus | Babylon Branch | Woodside toward Babylon |
| Terminus | West Hempstead Branch | Woodside toward West Hempstead |
| Terminus | Long Beach Branch | Woodside toward Long Beach |
| Terminus | Belmont Park Branch special events | Woodside toward Belmont Park |
| Preceding station | NJ Transit | Following station |
| Secaucus Junction toward Trenton | Northeast Corridor Line | Terminus |
| Secaucus Junction toward Bay Head | North Jersey Coast Line | Terminus |
| Secaucus Junction toward Hackettstown | Montclair–Boonton Line | Terminus |
| Secaucus Junction toward Hackettstown | Morristown Line | Terminus |
| Secaucus Junction toward High Bridge | Raritan Valley Line | Terminus |
| Secaucus Junction toward Gladstone | Gladstone Branch | Terminus |
Former services
| Preceding station | Amtrak | Following station |
|---|---|---|
| Terminus | Cape Codder 1986–1996 | Stamford toward Hyannis |
| Newark Penn toward Tri-State | Hilltopper 1978–1979 | Stamford toward Boston South |
| Newark Penn toward Washington, D.C. | Metroliner 1971–2006 | Terminus |
| Newark Penn toward Washington, D.C. | Montrealer 1972–1995 | Rye toward Montreal |
| Newark Penn toward Kansas City | National Limited 1971–1979 | Terminus |
| Newark Penn toward Chicago | Broadway Limited 1971–1995 | Terminus |
| Newark Penn toward Chicago | Three Rivers 1995–2005 | Terminus |
| Newark Penn toward Miami | Silver Star 1971–2024 | Terminus |
| Preceding station | NJ Transit | Following station |
| Newark Penn toward Atlantic City | ACES 2009–2011 | Terminus |
Future services
| Preceding station | Amtrak | Following station |
|---|---|---|
| Newark Penn toward Norfolk, Newport News or Christiansburg | Northeast Regional | Jamaica toward Ronkonkoma |
| Preceding station | Metro-North Railroad | Following station |
| Terminus | New Haven Line | Hunts Point toward Stamford |
| Secaucus Junction toward Port Jervis | Port Jervis Line | Terminus |
| Preceding station | NJ Transit | Following station |
| Secaucus Junction toward Spring Valley | Pascack Valley Line | Terminus |
| Secaucus Junction toward Suffern | Main Line | Terminus |
| Secaucus Junction toward Suffern | Bergen County Line | Terminus |
Location

Pennsylvania Station (also known as New York Penn Station or Penn Station) is the main intercity railroad station in New York City and the busiest transportation facility in the Western Hemisphere, serving more than 600,000 passengers per weekday as of 2019. (Note: The breakdown of Penn Station's ridership: Commuter and intercity rail comprise about 355,000 daily weekday passengers.; LIRR has an average of 233,340 daily weekday passengers.; NJ Transit has an average of 93,305 daily weekday passengers.; Amtrak has an average of 28,487 daily passengers, when annual totals are averaged.; The two subway stations have a combined average of approximately 200,000 daily weekday passengers. However, this only includes entries and not exits.; The remainder of the ridership, around 75,000 passengers, may use other transportation such as buses, taxis, or ride-sharing, and may include passengers exiting from the subway.) The station occupies a complex beneath and bounded by Seventh and Ninth avenues and 31st and 33rd streets, extending under Madison Square Garden and the James A. Farley Building, with additional exits to surrounding streets in Midtown Manhattan. The main concourse is located both beneath Madison Square Garden and within the Farley building, where it is known as Moynihan Train Hall. It is close to several popular locations, including the Empire State Building, Hudson Yards, Koreatown, and Macy's Herald Square.

Penn Station has 21 tracks fed by seven single-track tunnels: two North River Tunnels, four East River Tunnels, and the single-track Empire Connection tunnel. It is at the center of the Northeast Corridor, a passenger rail line that connects New York City with Boston to its north and Philadelphia, Baltimore, and Washington, D.C., to its south, along with various intermediate stations. Intercity trains are operated by Amtrak, which owns the station, while commuter rail services are operated by the Long Island Rail Road (LIRR) and NJ Transit (NJT). Connections are available within the complex to the New York City Subway and buses.

Penn Station is named for the Pennsylvania Railroad (PRR), its builder and original owner, and shares its name with several stations in other cities. The original Pennsylvania Station was an ornate station building designed by McKim, Mead, and White and considered a masterpiece of the Beaux-Arts style. Completed in 1910, it enabled direct rail access to New York City from the south for the first time. Its head house and train shed were torn down in 1963 at a time of low train ridership, with the rail infrastructure reconstituted as the smaller underground station that survives today. The New York Times editorial board described the demolition of the original station as a "monumental act of vandalism", and its destruction galvanized the modern historic preservation movement.

As rail travel increased again in the following decades, the underground station began to operate beyond its design capacity. By 2015, the station handled 650,000 travelers daily (more than the region's three major airports combined) and had become loathed for its cramped, claustrophobic conditions. The 2020s saw the opening of Moynihan Train Hall, a head house that expanded Penn Station into the Farley building, as well as expansion of the LIRR concourse and a new direct entrance from 33rd Street. Plans under development call for reconstruction of the core of the station, with competing proposals regarding the station's relationship to Madison Square Garden under consideration. Looking back on the pace of reconstruction since the announcement of Moynihan Hall in 1999, the Times noted in 2025 that "More than 25 years, five presidencies and four governors later, the plan to rebuild Penn Station is nowhere near completion."

== History ==
=== Planning and construction ===
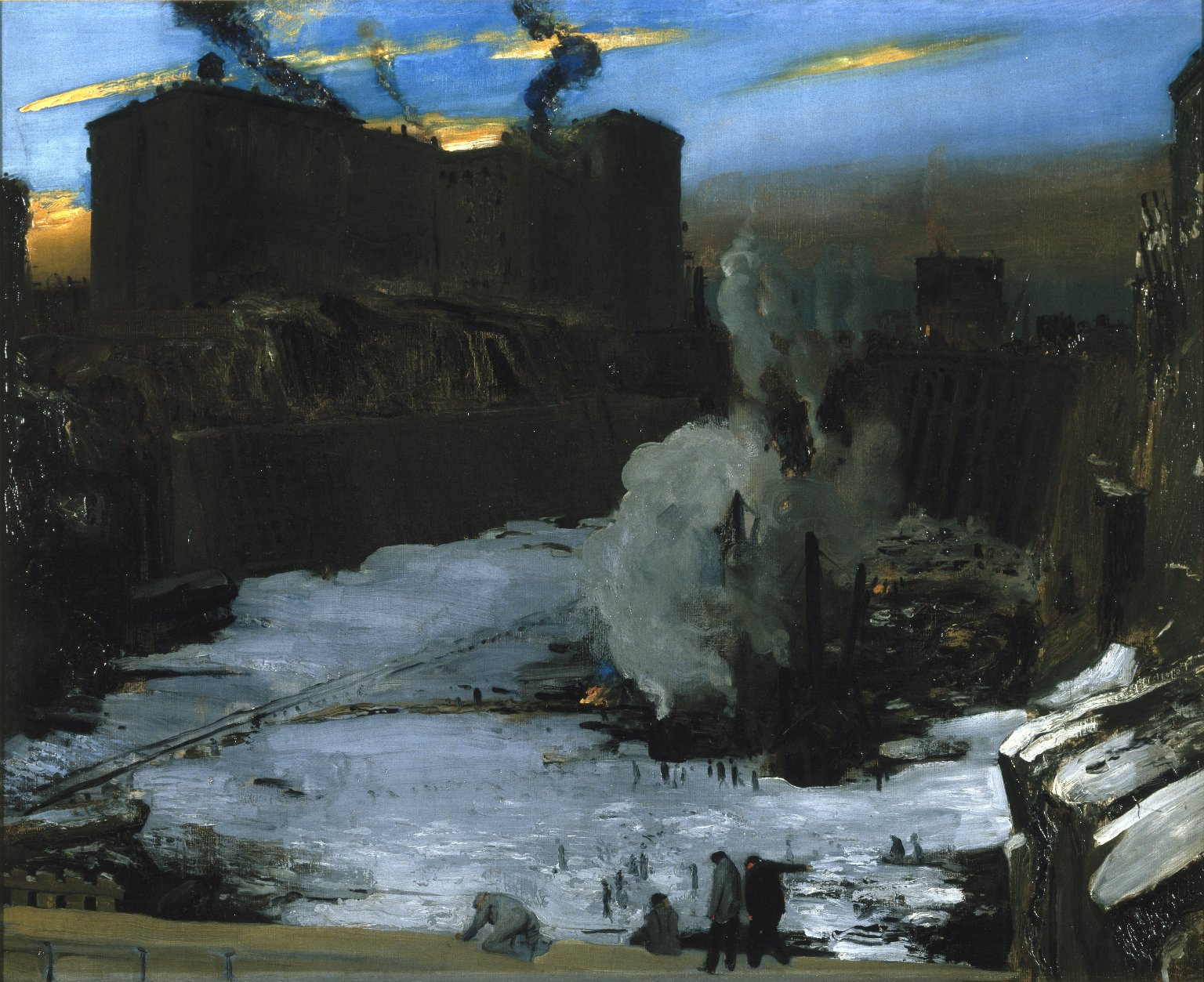
Pennsylvania Station Excavation, a painting by George Bellows

Until the early 20th century, the PRR's rail network terminated on the western side of the Hudson River (once known locally as the North River) at Exchange Place in Jersey City, New Jersey. Manhattan-bound passengers boarded ferries to cross the Hudson River for the final stretch of their journey.

The rival New York Central Railroad's line ran down Manhattan from the north under Park Avenue and terminated at Grand Central Depot (later replaced by Grand Central Terminal) at 42nd Street. Many proposals for a cross-Hudson connection were advanced in the late 19th century, but financial panics in the 1870s and 1890s scared off potential investors. In any event, none of the proposals advanced during this time were considered feasible.

An early proposal for a bridge was considered but rejected. The alternative was to tunnel under the river, but this was infeasible for steam locomotive use. The development of the electric locomotive at the turn of the 20th century made a tunnel feasible. In 1901, PRR president Alexander Cassatt announced the railroad's plan to enter New York City by tunneling under the Hudson and building a grand station on the West Side of Manhattan south of 34th Street. The station would sit in Manhattan's Tenderloin district, a historical red-light district known for its corruption and prostitution.

Beginning in June 1903, the two single-track North River Tunnels were bored from the west under the Hudson River. A second set of four single-track tunnels, the East River Tunnels, were bored from the east under the East River, linking the new station to Queens, the PRR-owned Long Island Rail Road, and Sunnyside Yard in Queens, where trains would be maintained and assembled. Construction was completed on the Hudson River tunnels on October 9, 1906, and on the East River tunnels on March 18, 1908.

=== Original structure ===
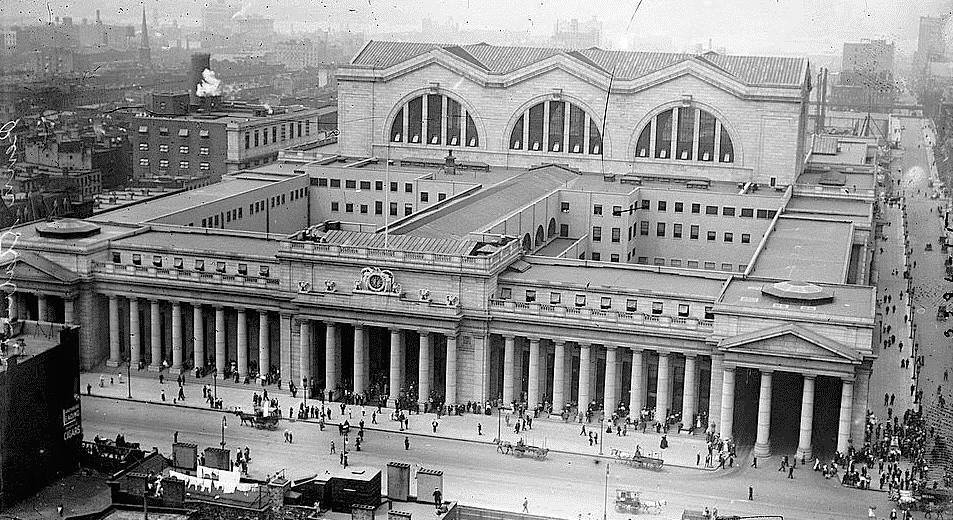
The exterior of Penn Station in 1911

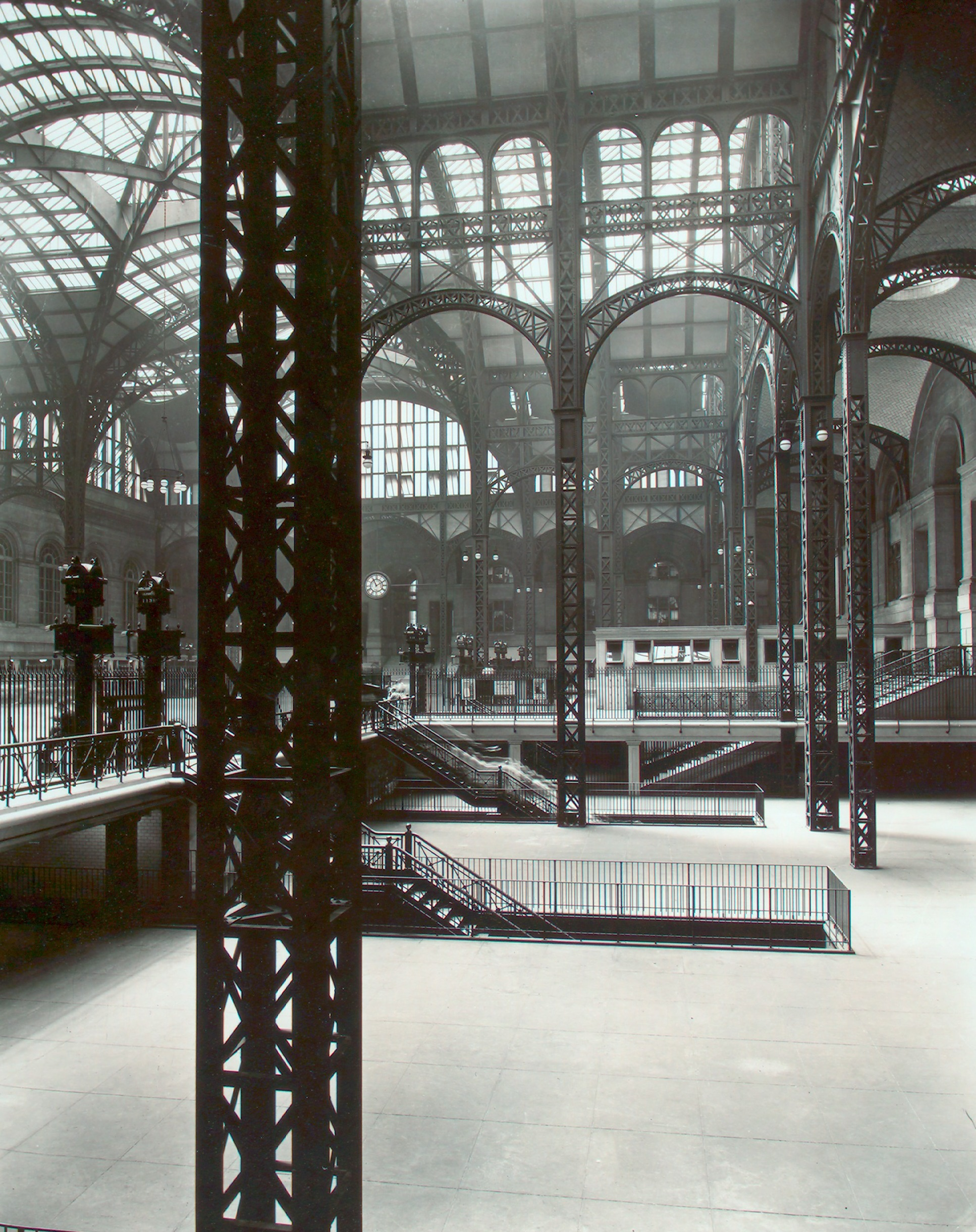
Penn Station's interior in the 1930s

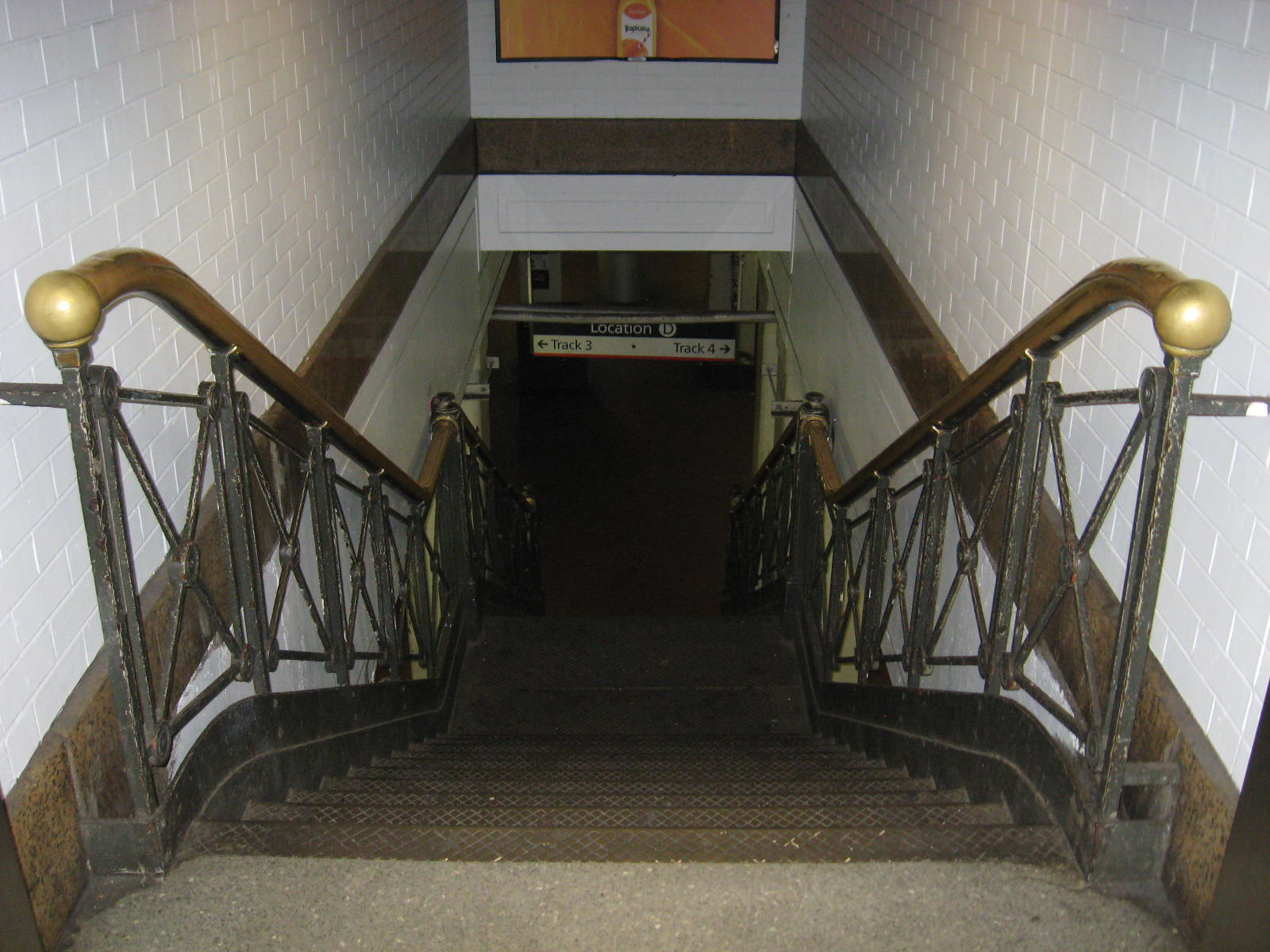
One of few remnants of the original station still in use, a staircase between tracks 3 and 4

A small portion of Penn Station opened on September 8, 1910, in conjunction with the opening of the East River Tunnels, and LIRR riders gained direct railroad service to Manhattan. On November 27, 1910, Penn Station was fully opened to the public. With the station's full opening, the PRR became the only railroad to enter New York City from the south.

During half a century of operation by the Pennsylvania Railroad (1910–1963), scores of intercity passenger trains arrived and departed daily to Chicago and St. Louis on "Pennsy" rails and beyond on connecting railroads to Miami and the west. Along with Long Island Rail Road trains, Penn Station saw trains of the New Haven and the Lehigh Valley railroads. A side effect of the tunneling project was to open the city up to the suburbs, and within 10 years of opening, two-thirds of the daily passengers coming through Penn Station were commuters.

The station put the Pennsylvania Railroad at comparative advantage to its competitors offering direct service from Manhattan to the west and south. Other railroads began their routes at terminals in Weehawken, Hoboken, Pavonia and Communipaw which required passengers from New York City to take the interstate Hudson Tubes (now PATH) or ferries across the Hudson River before boarding their trains. By 1945, at its peak, more than 100 million passengers a year traveled through Penn Station.

By the late 1950s, intercity rail passenger volumes had declined dramatically with the coming of the Jet Age and the Interstate Highway System. The station's exterior had become somewhat grimy, and due to its vast scale, the station was expensive to maintain. A renovation covered some of the grand columns with plastic and blocked off the spacious central hallway with a new ticket office. The Pennsylvania Railroad optioned the air rights, which called for the demolition of the head house and train shed, to be replaced by an office complex and a new sports complex, while the tracks of the station would remain untouched. (Note: The Railway and Engineering Review article says at their highest the station tracks were nine feet below sea level.)

Plans for the new Penn Plaza and Madison Square Garden were announced in 1962. In exchange for the air rights to Penn Station, the PRR would receive a smaller underground station at no cost and a 25 percent stake in the new Madison Square Garden Complex. Modern architects rushed to save the ornate building, but to no avail; demolition of the above-ground head house began in October 1963. A giant steel deck was placed over the tracks and platforms to allow rail service to continue during construction. Photographs of the day showed passengers waiting for trains even as the head house was demolished around them. This was possible because most of the rail infrastructure (including the waiting room, concourses, and boarding platforms) was below street level.

The demolition of the Penn Station head house caused outrage internationally. "One entered the city like a god. One scuttles in now like a rat," the architectural historian Vincent Scully wrote after the removal of the original station. The controversy over the demolition of such a well-known landmark, and its deplored replacement, is often cited as a catalyst for the architectural preservation movement in the United States. Within the decade, Grand Central Terminal was protected under the city's new landmarks preservation act, a protection upheld by the courts in 1978 after a challenge by Grand Central's owner, Penn Central (the corporate successor of the PRR, following its merger with the rival New York Central Railroad).

=== Under Madison Square Garden ===
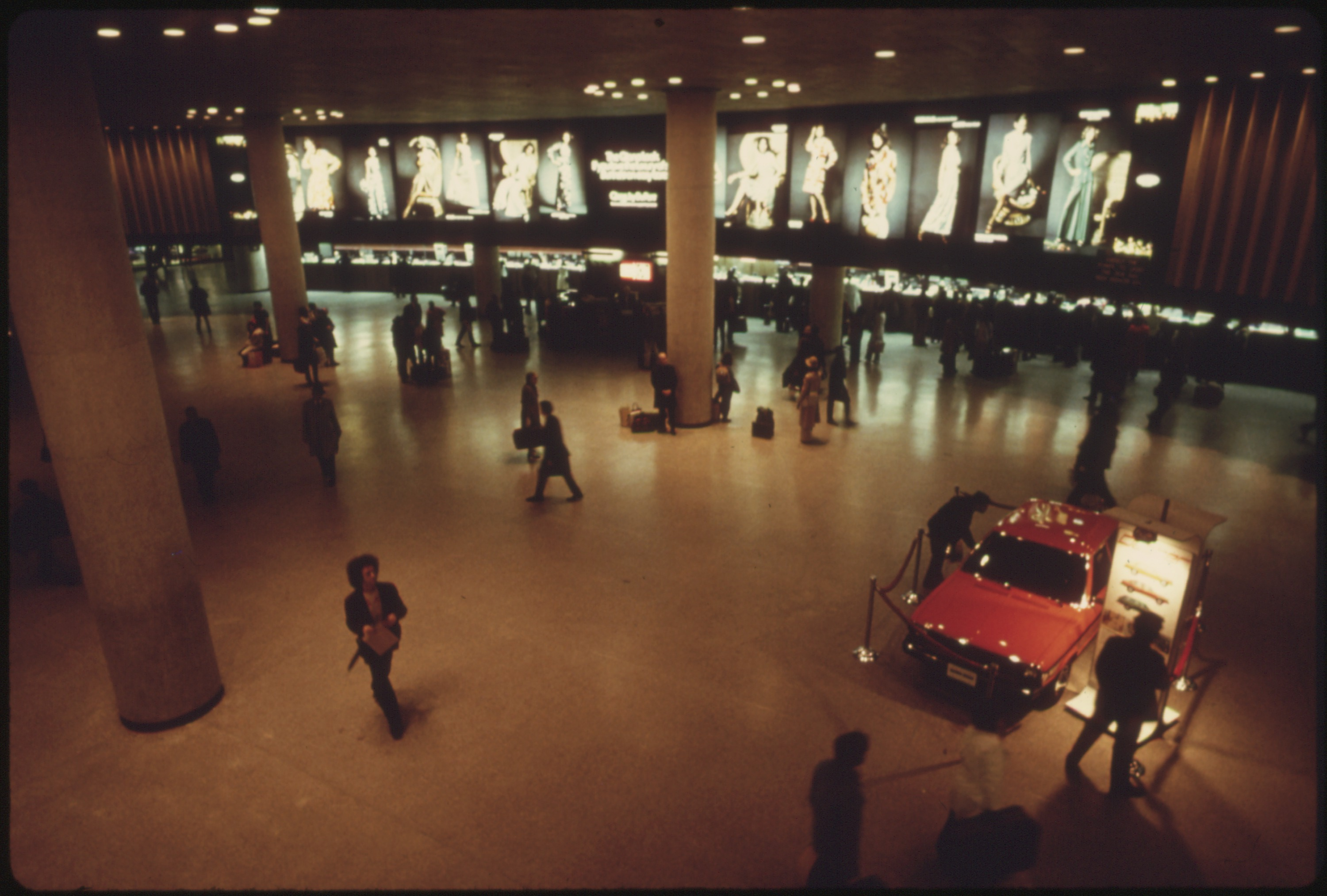
Amtrak concourse in 1974

Post-1968, the core Penn Station has been underground, sitting below Madison Square Garden, 33rd Street, and Two Penn Plaza. The core has three levels: concourses on the upper two levels and train platforms on the lowest. The two levels of concourses, while renovated and expanded during the construction of Madison Square Garden, are original to the 1910 station, as are the tracks and platforms.

Over the following decades, various renovations attempted to add service and some concourse space. The West End Concourse under Eighth Avenue opened in 1986. In 1987, a rail connection to the West Side Rail Yard opened, and in 1991, the opening of the Empire Connection allowed Amtrak to consolidate all of its New York City trains at Penn Station; previously, trains from the Empire Corridor terminated at Grand Central Terminal, a legacy of the two stations' respective roots in separate railroads.

In 1994, the station was renovated to add the 34th Street LIRR entrance and central corridor, along with artwork and improved waiting and concession areas. The new entrance consisted of a 90-foot-tall (27 m) structure with a glass and brick facade, a clock salvaged from the original station, and air-conditioning units for the terminal. In 2002, the NJ Transit concourse was created in space previously occupied by retail and Amtrak office space, although the concourse could only be accessed from the Amtrak entrance on 32nd Street. Plans for a new entrance from 31st Street to the NJ Transit concourse were announced in 2006, and the entrance opened in 2009. In 2020, the ticketed waiting room on the main concourse was renovated by Amtrak and NJ Transit to include furniture with USB outlets, an additional entrance, and a lactation suite.

After the September 11 attacks, security was increased and passenger flow curtailed. In 2002, $100 million of work added security features such as lighting, cameras, and barricades. The taxiway under Madison Square Garden, which ran from 31st Street to 33rd Street at mid-block, was permanently closed off with concrete Jersey barriers. Escalators providing direct access to the lobby of Madison Square Garden were closed and later removed. The underground Gimbels Passageway connecting pedestrians to 34th Street–Herald Square has been sealed off since 1986, after decades of safety concerns and sexual assaults.

Despite the modest renovations, the underground Penn Station continued to be criticized as "reviled", "dysfunctional", and a low-ceilinged "catacomb" lacking charm, especially when compared to the much larger and more ornate Grand Central Terminal. The New York Times, in an editorial supporting development of an enlarged terminal, said that "Amtrak's beleaguered customers...scurry through underground rooms bereft of light or character," and Times transit reporter Michael M. Grynbaum called Penn Station "the ugly stepchild of the city's two great rail terminals." After its nadir in the 1960s, ridership exploded in subsequent decades, a situation never contemplated by the structure's designers. By the 2010s, the station operated at almost three times its intended capacity; over 600,000 passengers used the station daily in 2019. The number of daily travelers surpassed the combined traffic of the region's three major airports.

=== Expansion and renovation ===
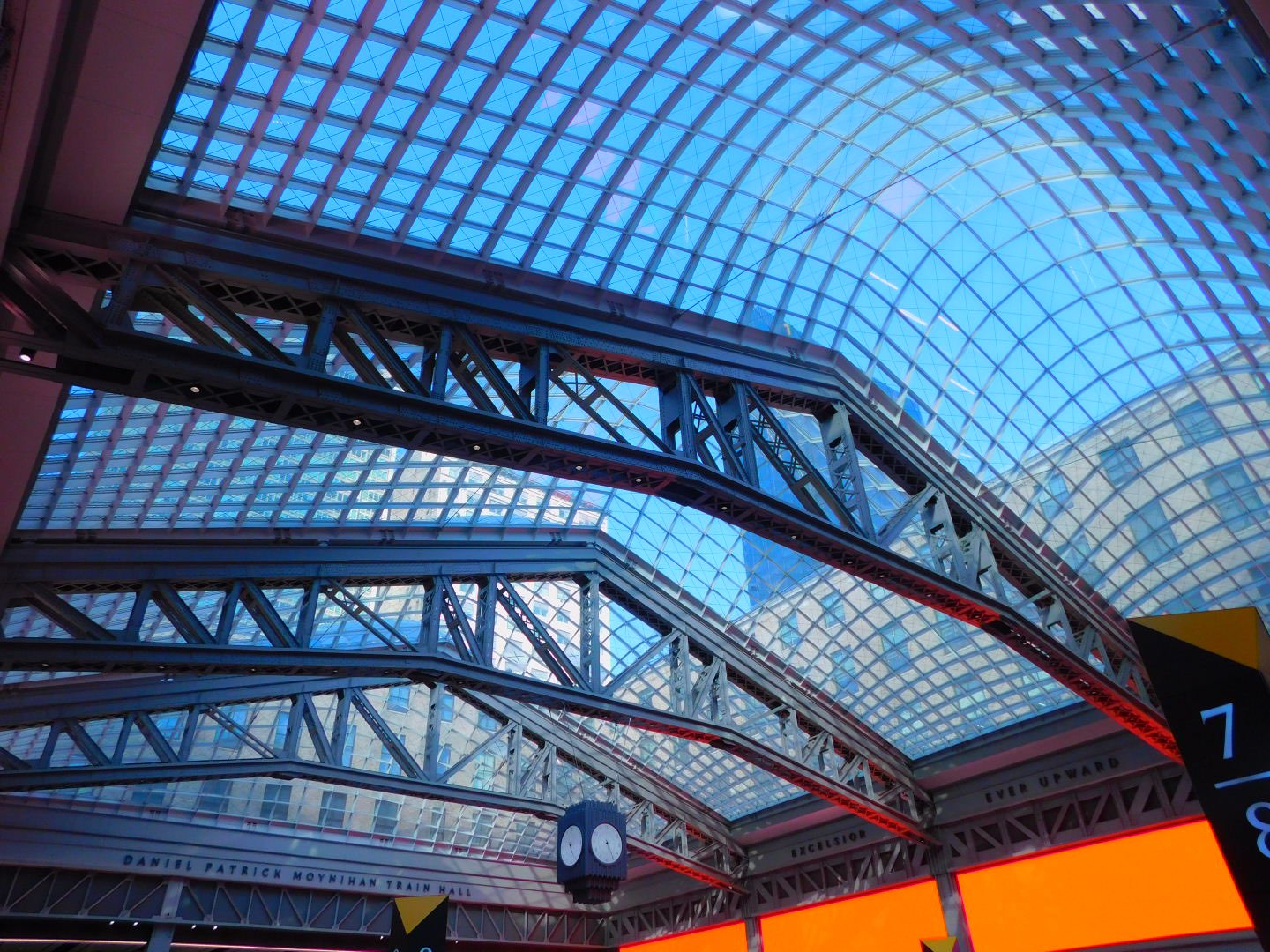
Steel-glass roof of Moynihan Train Hall in April 2023

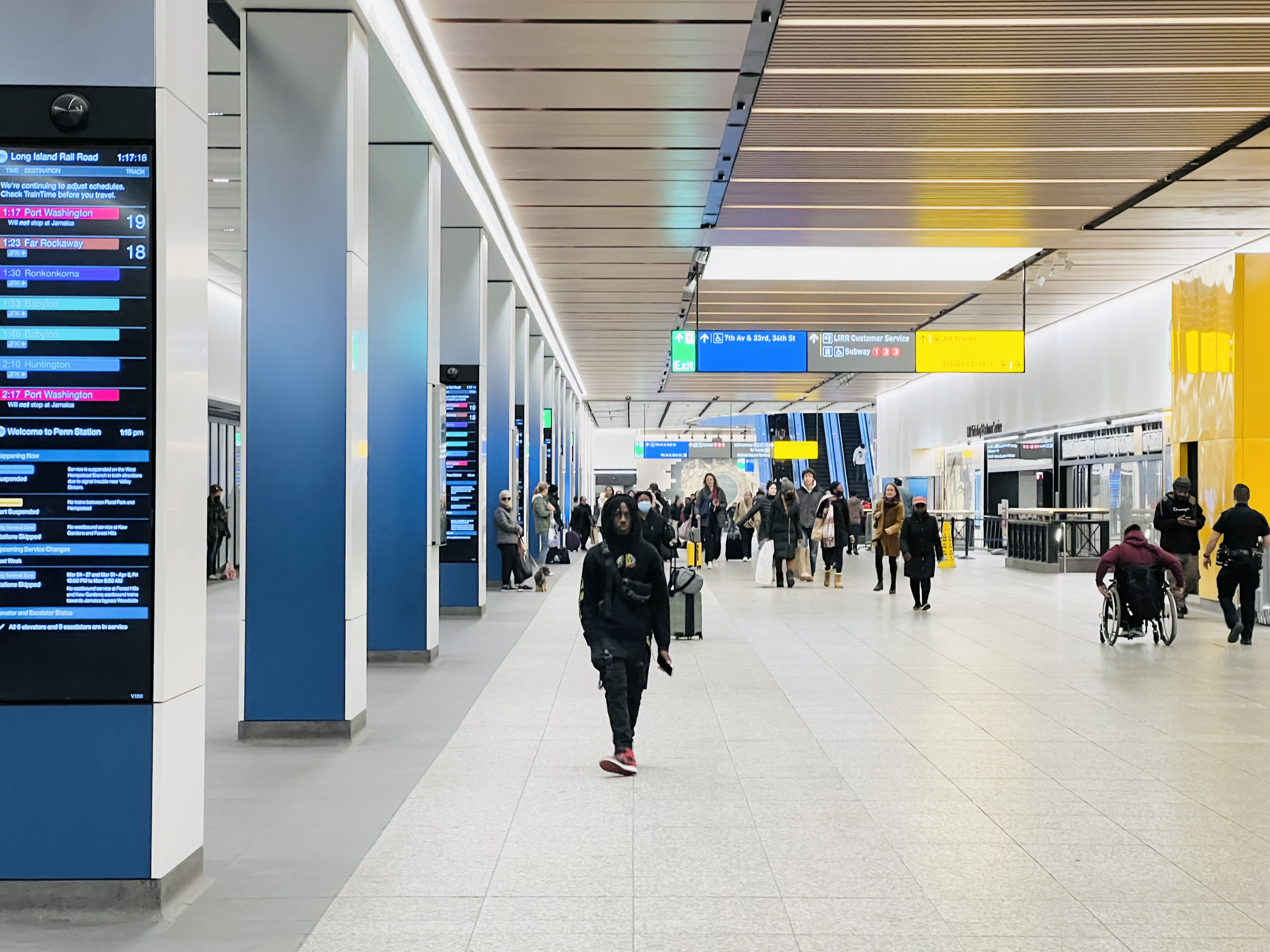
Long Island Rail Road concourse after renovation, 2023

In the early 1990s, U.S. Senator Daniel Patrick Moynihan proposed building a new station in the James A. Farley Building, the city's former main post office across the street which was designed by the same firm as the original Penn Station; Moynihan had shined shoes in the original station as a boy. Many redevelopment or expansion concepts were proposed over the 1990s and 2000s, but none reached fruition until funding from the 2009 American Recovery and Reinvestment Act enabled the expansion of the West End Concourse of the LIRR under the Farley Building in 2016.

In 2016 New York Governor Andrew Cuomo announced plans for the renovation of Penn Station and redevelopment of the Farley Building to include a new train hall, calling his plan the Empire Station Complex. Moynihan Train Hall opened in January 2021 and was named for the man who had conceived it. The $1.6 billion, 255,000-square-foot (23,700 m^{2}) renovation retained the landmarked Beaux Arts Farley Building, added a central atrium with a glass roof, and provided access to Amtrak and LIRR trains, receiving the 2021 Prix Versailles for passenger stations. A new 33rd Street entrance to the LIRR concourse opened at the same time.

Following the opening of the 33rd Street entrance, in 2023 the LIRR concourse was doubled in width and the ceilings were raised to at least 18 feet (5.5 m) feet by removing seven "head knockers", low-hanging steel beams only 6 feet 8 inches (2.03 m) above the concourse's floor which were part of the original Penn Station. 33rd Street between Seventh and Eighth Avenues was converted into a pedestrian plaza and permanently closed to vehicular traffic, opening in June 2024 as part of a $65 million project funded by Vornado.

== Services ==
The station is served by 1,300 arrivals and departures per day, twice as many as there were during the 1970s. There are more than 600,000 subway, commuter rail and Amtrak passengers who use the station on an average weekday, or up to 1,000 every ninety seconds. It is the busiest passenger transportation facility in the United States and in North America.

=== Operations ===
Penn Station currently operates in a hybrid mode, with some trains turning back at the station and others running through the station. Almost all Amtrak trains servicing the Northeast Corridor run through Penn Station in either revenue-to-revenue or revenue-to-non-revenue mode, while LIRR and NJT operate both turning trains and through-running trains. This hybrid regime is optimized for the peak commuter demand between the suburbs and Manhattan, with a highly optimized operating plan for each railroad that results in unbalanced service.

During the morning peak period, many commuter trains are "through-run" to storage yards after dropping off passengers, a mode of operation which requires the shortest station dwell times and helps achieve maximum throughput. Roughly one-third of LIRR trains arriving from the east between 6:00 AM and 10:00 AM continue on to the West Side Yard, and a similar percentage of NJT trains arriving from the west continue on to Sunnyside Yard in Queens. The afternoon peak operation is similar but in reverse. The balance of daily trains turn at the station, either running back in revenue service or "deadheading" back to outlying termini to return for another trip or to await the next peak period.

The following table summarizes peak hour train movements:

Current Train Movements in the Peak Hour at Penn Station
| Railroad | AM Peak | PM Peak |
|---|---|---|
| LIRR | 64 LIRR trains arriving from Nassau and Suffolk counties and Queens turnaround in Penn Station; 36 trains "run-through" to West Side Yard for mid-day storage where they are serviced and made ready for a later return trip; 28 trains reverse direction in the station | 89 LIRR trains depart Penn Station; 35 trains run-through from West Side Yard; 54 trains reverse direction in the station |
| NJT | 39 NJT trains arriving from New Jersey reverse direction in Penn Station; 21 trains "run-through" to Sunnyside Yard for mid-day storage, servicing, and staging for the PM Peak service period | 55 NJT trains depart Penn Station; 19 trains run through from Sunnyside Yard; 36 trains reverse direction |
| Amtrak | 28 Amtrak trains operate through Penn Station including Northeast Corridor, Empire Corridor and Long-Haul inter-city services; All trains run through Penn Station, either as revenue trains or to and from Sunnyside Yard | 31 Amtrak trains operate through Penn Station including Northeast Corridor, Empire Corridor and Long-Haul inter-city services.; All trains run through Penn Station, either as revenue trains or to and from Sunnyside Yard |

In summary, about 193 commuter trains turn around in Penn Station during the combined Peak service periods, and 111 commuter trains run-through to West Side or Sunnyside Yards. As both yards are at their practical capacity, any major increase in revenue-to-storage through-running would require major expansion of yard capacity.

=== Intercity rail ===
==== Amtrak ====
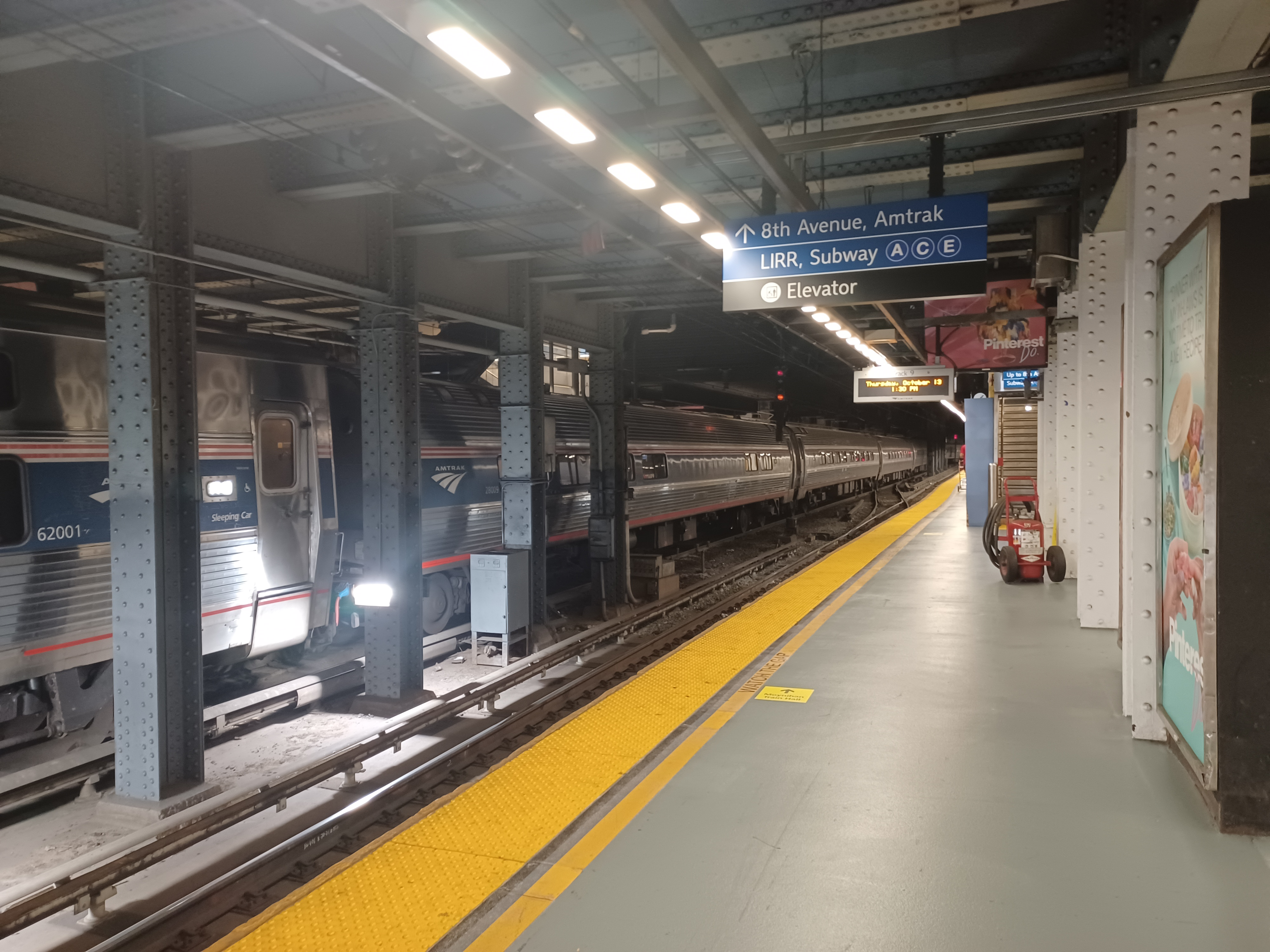
An Amtrak platform at Penn Station

Amtrak owns the station and uses it for the following services:

- Acela to Boston (northern terminus) and Washington D.C. (southern terminus)
- Adirondack to Montreal
- Berkshire Flyer to Pittsfield
- Cardinal to Chicago
- Carolinian to Charlotte
- Crescent to New Orleans
- Empire Service to Albany–Rensselaer and Niagara Falls, NY
- Ethan Allen Express to Burlington
- Keystone Service to Harrisburg
- Lake Shore Limited to Chicago
- Maple Leaf to Toronto
- Pennsylvanian to Pittsburgh
- Northeast Regional to Boston or Springfield (northern termini) and Washington D.C., Roanoke, Newport News, Richmond, or Norfolk (southern termini)
- Palmetto to Savannah
- Silver Meteor to Miami
- Vermonter to Washington D.C. (southern terminus) and St. Albans (northern terminus)

All except the Acela, Northeast Regional and Vermonter originate and terminate at Penn Station. Amtrak normally uses tracks 5–12 alongside New Jersey Transit and shares tracks 13–16 with the LIRR and NJ Transit.

=== Commuter rail ===
==== Long Island Rail Road ====
The following Long Island Rail Road (LIRR) services originate and terminate at Penn Station:

- Babylon Branch to Babylon
- Belmont Park Branch seasonal service to Belmont Park
- Far Rockaway Branch to Far Rockaway
- Hempstead Branch to Hempstead
- Long Beach Branch to Long Beach
- Montauk Branch to Speonk and Montauk
- Oyster Bay Branch to Oyster Bay
- Port Jefferson Branch to Huntington and Port Jefferson
- Port Washington Branch to Port Washington
- Ronkonkoma Branch to Ronkonkoma with connecting service to Greenport
- West Hempstead Branch to West Hempstead

All branches connect at Jamaica station except the Port Washington Branch. Jamaica station also connects to Airtrain JFK for service to John F. Kennedy International Airport.

Normally, the LIRR uses tracks 17 to 21 exclusively and shares tracks 13 to 16 with Amtrak and NJT. The LIRR uses tracks 11 and 12 on rare occasions.

==== NJ Transit ====
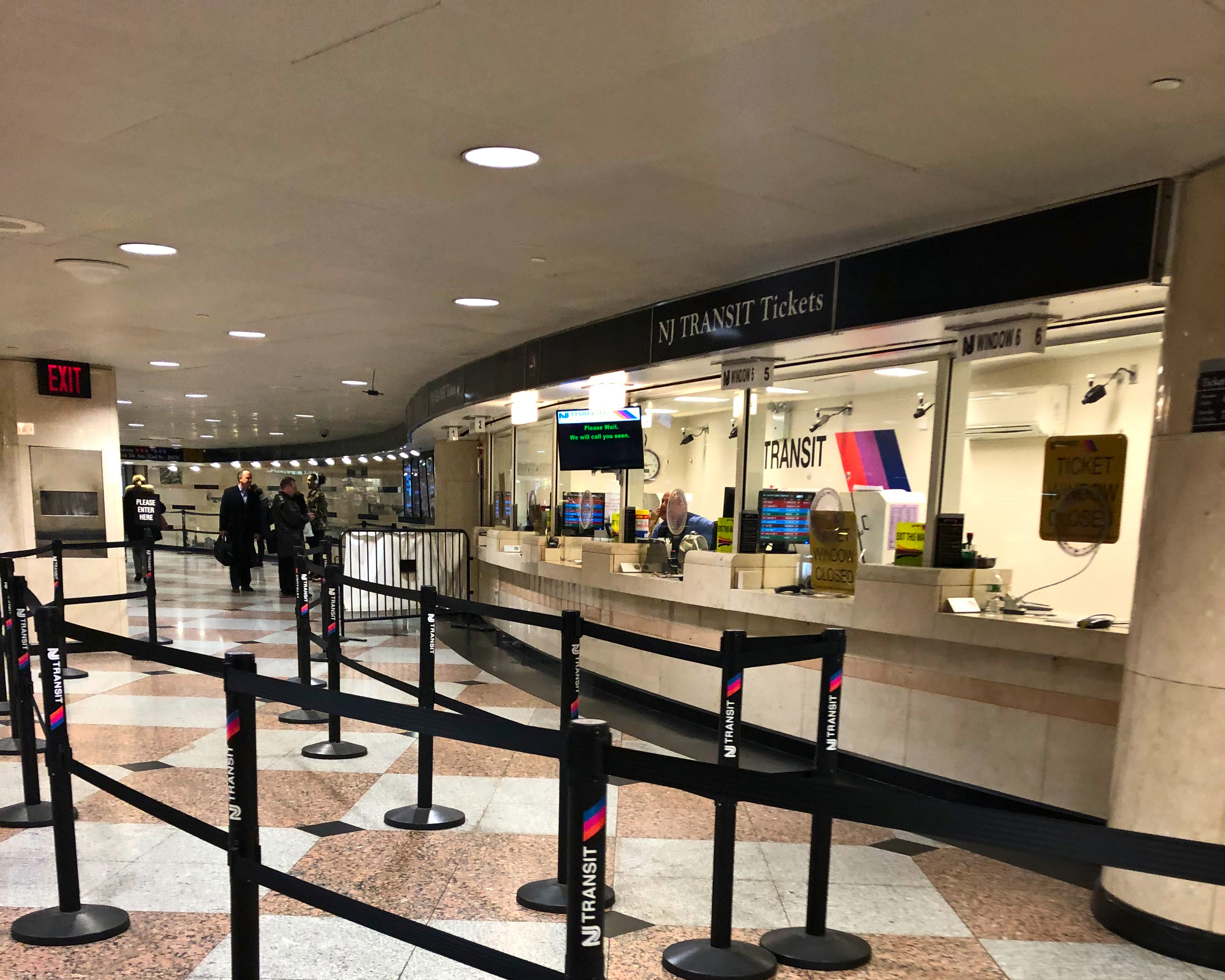
NJ Transit ticket counter

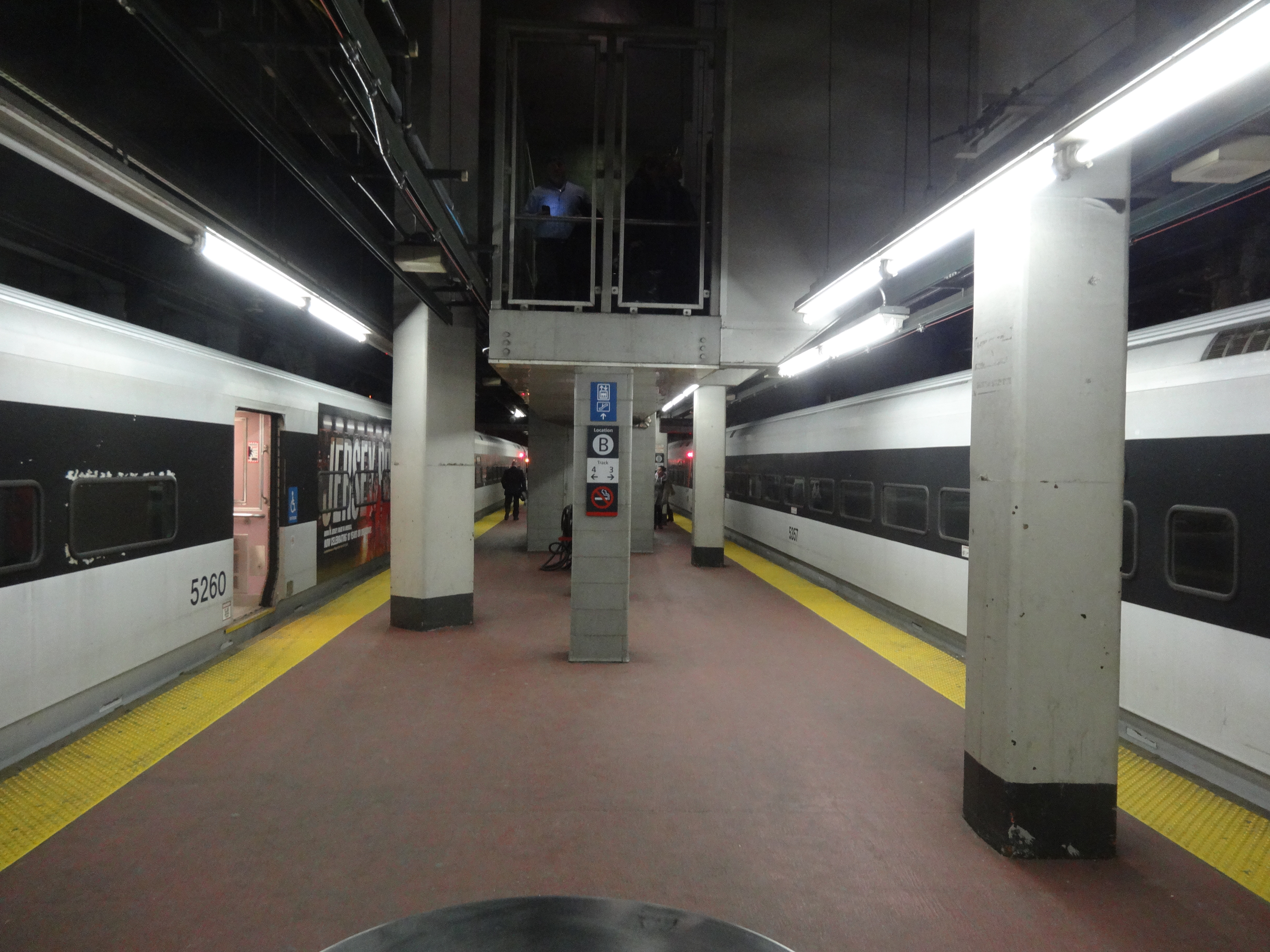
A NJ Transit platform

The following NJ Transit Rail Operations (NJT) branches originate and terminate at Penn Station:

- Montclair-Boonton Line to Montclair State University station, with connecting service west to Hackettstown.
- Morris and Essex Lines, consisting of the Morristown Line to Dover via Morristown and the Gladstone Branch to Gladstone.
- Northeast Corridor Line to Trenton
- North Jersey Coast Line to Long Branch and Bay Head
- Raritan Valley Line to Raritan and High Bridge

NJT normally uses tracks 1 to 4 exclusively, as these four tracks end at bumper blocks to their east. NJT shares tracks 5 through 12 with Amtrak, and occasionally uses tracks 13 to 16, which are shared with Amtrak and the LIRR.

=== Rapid transit ===
==== New York City Subway ====
Connections are available to the following New York City Subway stations:

- From Penn Station:
  - A, C, and E trains at 34th Street–Penn Station, under Eighth Avenue
  - 1, 2, and 3 trains at 34th Street–Penn Station, under Seventh Avenue
- From Herald Square, one block east at Sixth Avenue:
  - B, D, F, <F>, M, N, Q, R, and W trains at 34th Street–Herald Square station, under Broadway & Sixth Avenue

==== PATH ====
Connections are also available to the PATH system at 33rd Street station, under Sixth Avenue on Herald Square. The JSQ-33 and HOB-33 services terminate at 33rd Street on weekdays, and are combined into the JSQ-33 (via HOB) service on late nights, weekends and holidays.

=== Bus and coach ===
==== New York City Bus ====
The following MTA Regional Bus Operations buses stop near Penn Station:

- M7 (Lenox, Columbus, Amsterdam, Sixth and Seventh Avenues): southbound to Greenwich Village, via Seventh Avenue; or northbound to Harlem via Sixth, Amsterdam, and Lenox Avenues
- M20 (Seventh and Eighth Avenues/Varick and Hudson Streets): northbound to Lincoln Center via Eighth Avenue; or southbound to South Ferry via Seventh Avenue
- M34 Select Bus Service (34th Street Crosstown): westbound to Javits Center; or eastbound to FDR Drive
- M34A Select Bus Service (34th Street Crosstown): westbound to Port Authority Bus Terminal; or eastbound to Waterside Plaza and Kips Bay
- Q32 (Fifth and Madison Avenues): northbound only, to Jackson Heights, Queens

==== Intercity coaches ====
Intercity bus service to and from Penn Station is provided by Vamoose Bus, Tripper Bus, and Go Buses. Vamoose Bus runs buses from a stop near Penn Station to Bethesda, Maryland; Arlington, Virginia; and Lorton, Virginia. Tripper Bus runs buses from a stop near Penn Station to Bethesda, Maryland and Arlington, Virginia. Go Buses runs buses from a stop near Penn Station to Newton, Massachusetts and Cambridge, Massachusetts.

In 2021, the private parking lot at 300 West 31st Street (the southwest corner of 8th Avenue) was established as a major Midtown Manhattan hub stop for FlixBus.

Most intercity and commuter bus services to and from midtown Manhattan use the Port Authority Bus Terminal, located approximately 0.5 miles (0.8 kilometers) to the north of Penn Station.

=== Proposed Metro-North service ===
The Metropolitan Transportation Authority plans to bring Metro-North Railroad commuter trains to Penn Station as part of its Penn Station Access project. The East Side Access project, which was completed in 2023, has freed up track and platform space at Penn Station by redirecting some LIRR trains from Penn Station to Grand Central Madison. This new capacity, as well as track connections resulting from the East Side Access project, will allow Metro-North trains on the New Haven Line to run to Penn Station via Amtrak's Hell Gate Bridge.

Four new local Metro-North stations in the Bronx are planned as part of this project, at Co-op City, Morris Park, Parkchester/VanNest, and Hunts Point. The MTA also proposes a second service from the Metro-North's Hudson Line to Penn Station using Amtrak's West Side Line in Manhattan. The Penn Station Access project would provide direct rides from Connecticut, Westchester County, the Lower Hudson Valley, and the Bronx to West Midtown; ease reverse-commuting from Manhattan and the Bronx to Westchester County, the Lower Hudson Valley, and Connecticut; and provide transportation service to areas of the Bronx without direct subway service.

== Station layout ==
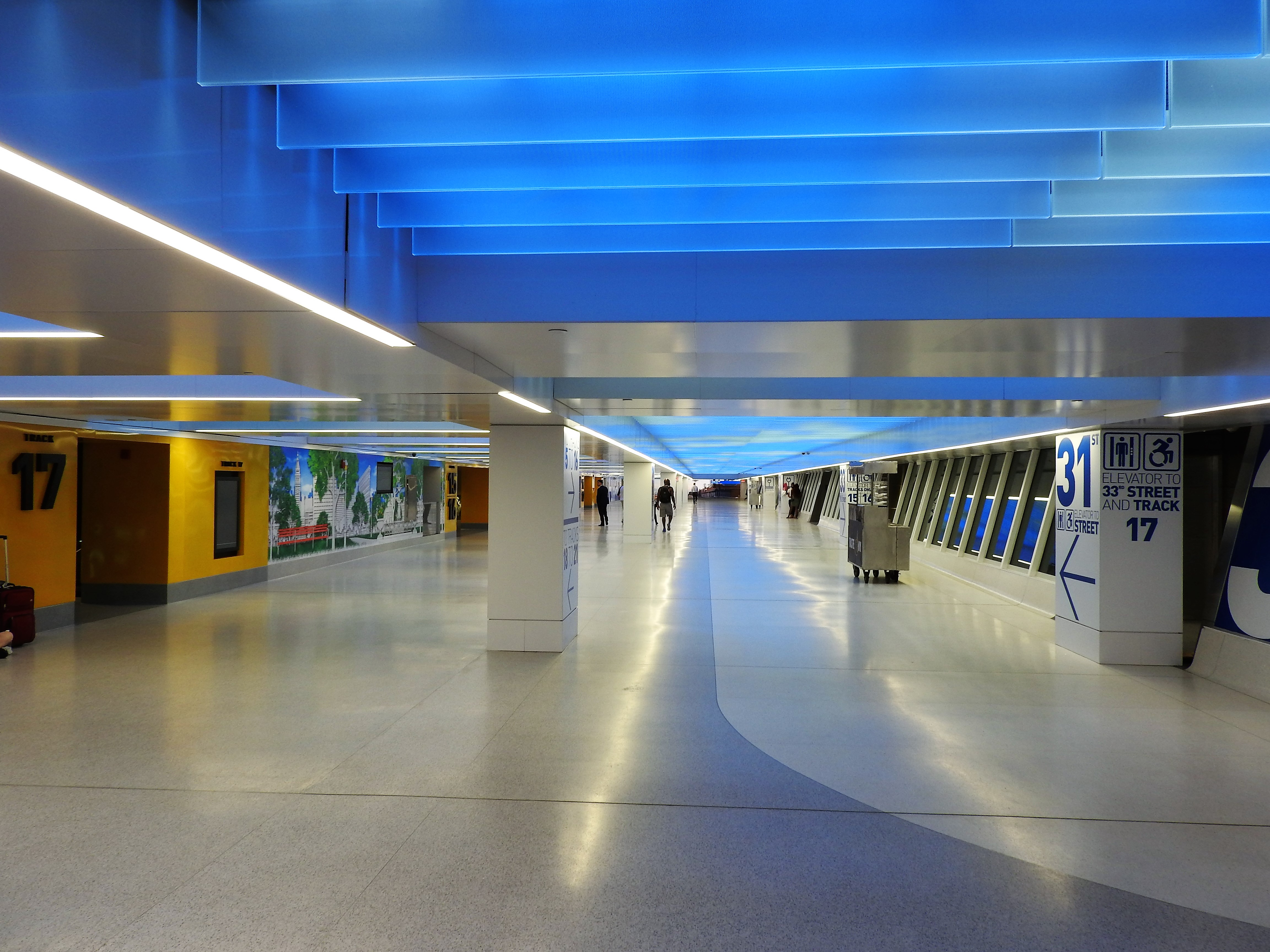
The West End Concourse

Penn Station does not have a unified design or floor plan but rather is divided into separate Amtrak, LIRR and NJ Transit concourses with each concourse maintained and styled differently by its respective operator. The Amtrak and NJ Transit concourses are located on the first level below the street level while the Long Island Rail Road concourse is two levels below street level. The layout has been called a "confusing, multilevel maze of corridors," even prompting Amtrak at one point to release an app to assist commuters in navigating the station.

Platform widths vary, with eight of the 11 platforms in the range of 19–20 feet wide. Platform 6 is the narrowest, at 17 feet, while Platform 1 is slightly wider, at 22 feet. Platform 10 is the widest platform, used exclusively by LIRR and nominally 38 feet wide.

The main concourse, which was principally used by Amtrak until the opening of the Moynihan Train Hall in 2021, is at the west end of the block directly beneath Madison Square Garden and now used principally by NJ Transit. It was created out of the original station's waiting rooms and main concourse, though few remnants of the original still exist in the space. It was renovated in the early 2000s in anticipation of Acela service and includes an enclosed waiting area for ticketed passengers with seats, outlets and Wi-Fi. The ticketed waiting room underwent another $7.2 million renovation from 2019 to 2020, which included new furniture and fixtures with USB outlets, a ceiling with LED lighting, a second entrance closer to the NJ Transit concourse, and a lactation suite for nursing mothers.

The LIRR's connecting concourse runs below West 33rd Street between Seventh and Eighth Avenues, as it has since the original station opened in 1910. Significant renovations were made to the LIRR areas over a three-year period ending in 1994, including the opening of the Central Corridor passageway and the addition of a new entry pavilion on 34th Street. The West End Concourse, west of Eighth Avenue, opened in 1986, and was widened and lengthened to cover tracks 5 through 21 in 2017. In 2023, the LIRR concourse was renovated again, doubling the width of the corridor, raising the ceilings, and adding another entry pavilion directly from 33rd Street.

The NJ Transit concourse near Seventh Avenue opened in 2002 out of existing retail and Amtrak office space. A new street-level entrance to this concourse at the corner of 31st Street and Seventh Avenue opened in September 2009. Before a dedicated NJ Transit concourse opened, NJ Transit used space in the Amtrak concourse.

Moynihan Train Hall provides access to tracks 5 through 21, and contains ticket desks and service for Amtrak as well as the Long Island Railroad. Amtrak operations moved to the train hall entirely when it opened in 2021. The train hall contains a ticketing and baggage area, a waiting lounge, an Amtrak Metropolitan lounge, and retail spaces.

The station's three providers use different official addresses for the station.

- Amtrak: 351 West 31st Street
- LIRR: 34th Street at 7th and 8th Avenues
- NJ Transit: 31st Street and 7th Avenue
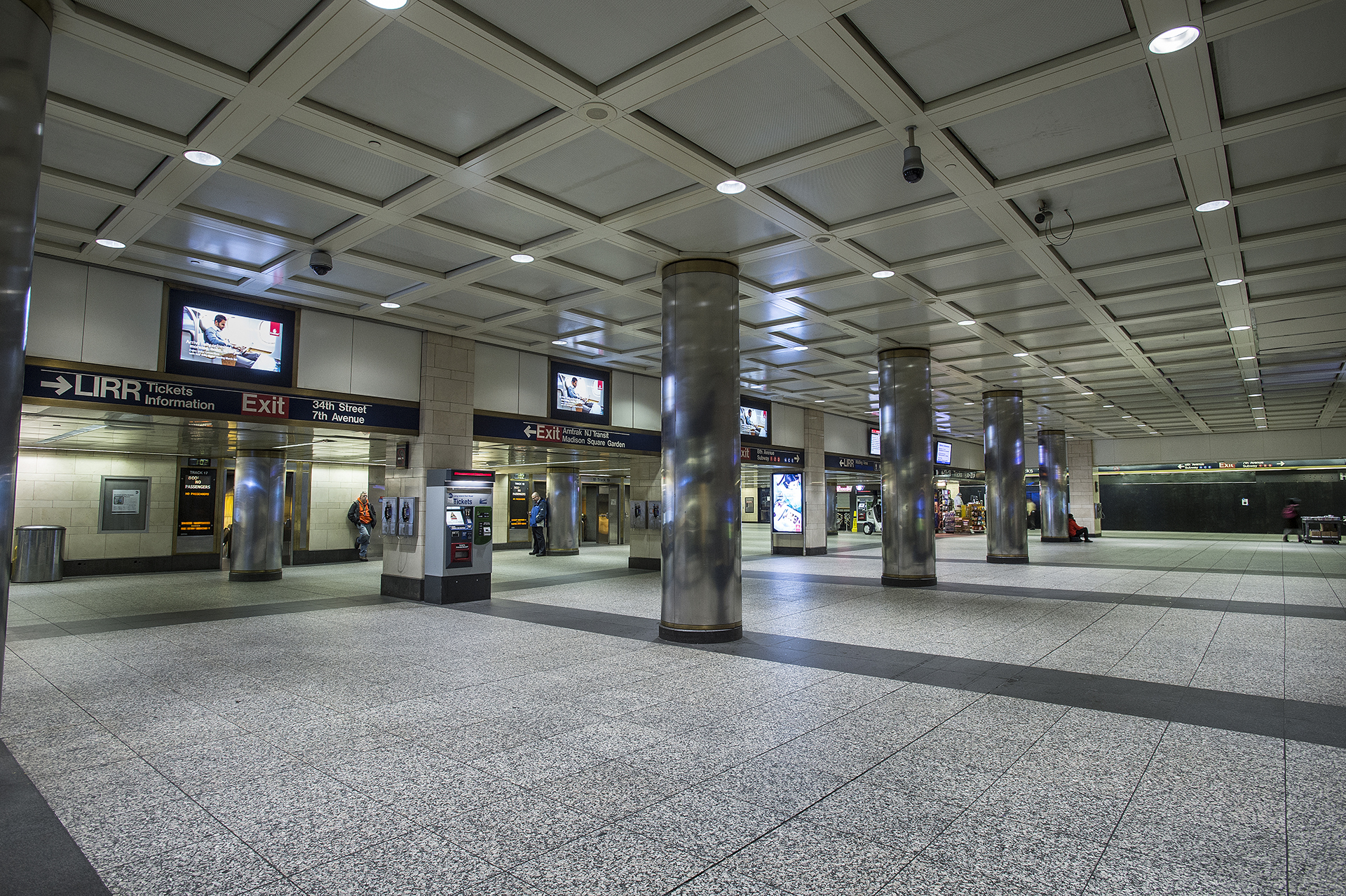
LIRR concourse in 2015

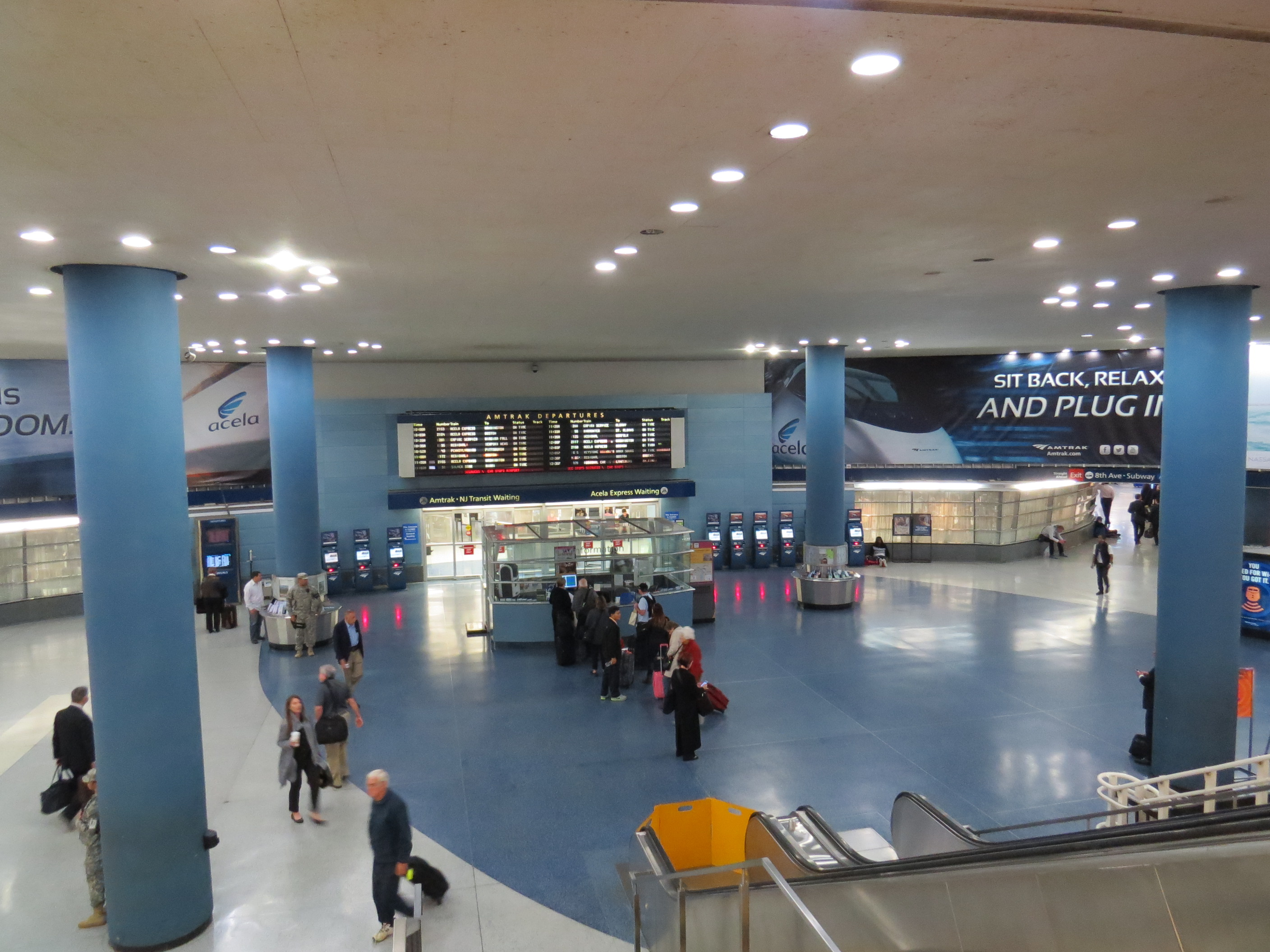
Amtrak concourse

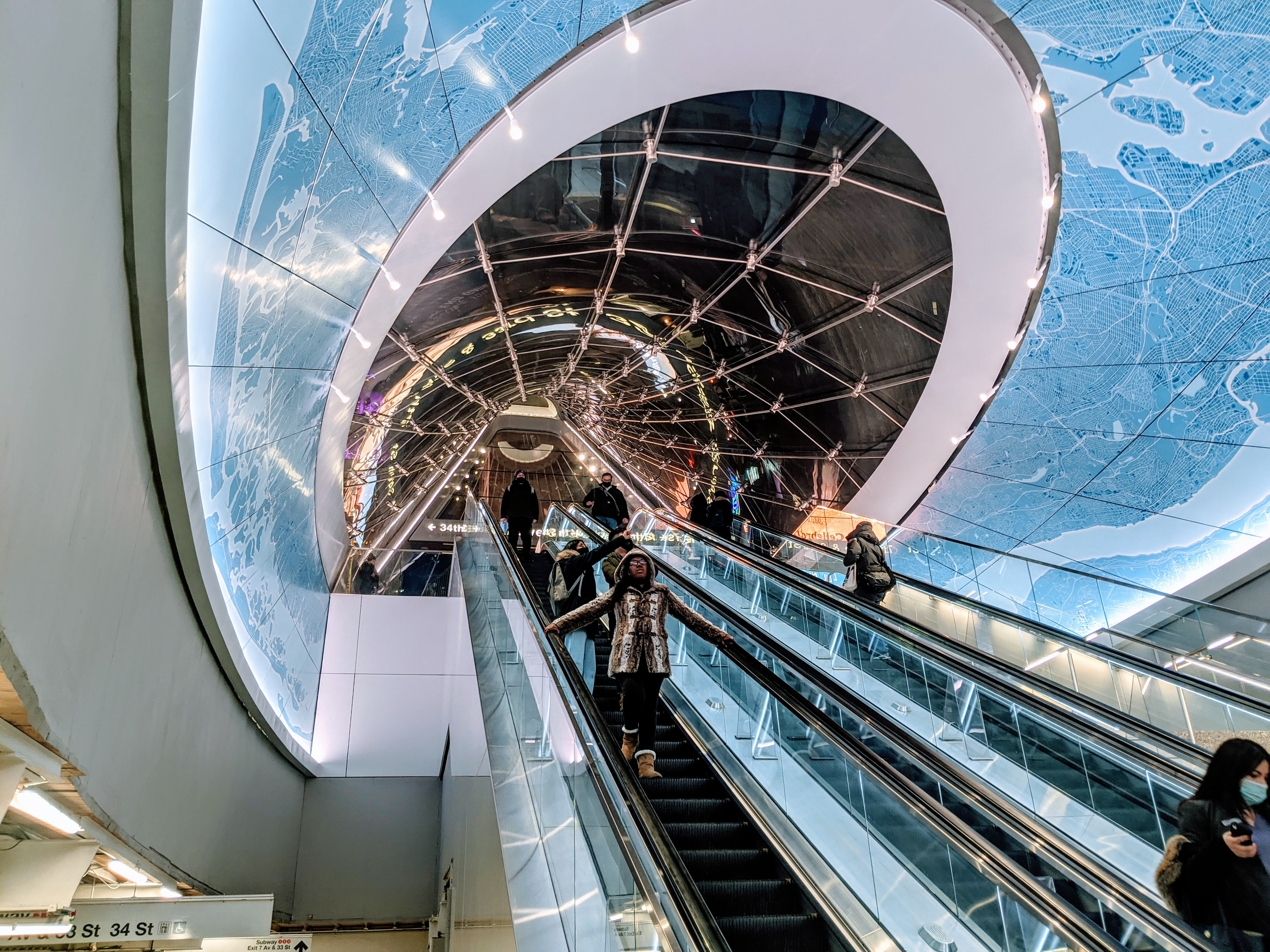
East End Gateway at 7th Avenue

8th Avenue entrance

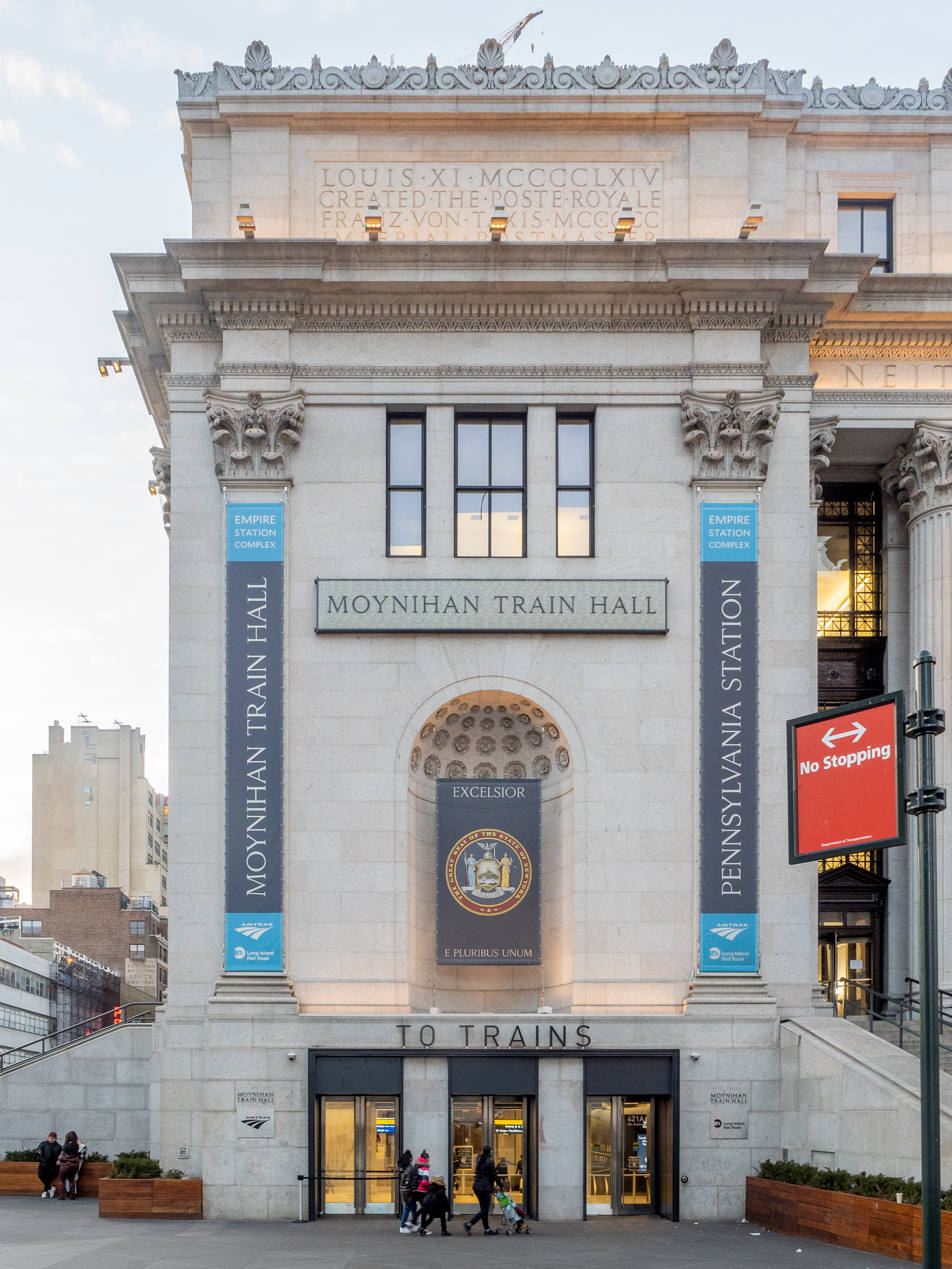
Entrance in the Farley Post Office Building

Station layout
| Above ground | Madison Square Garden/Two Penn Plaza |
| G | Street Level | Exit/Entrance |
| UC | Amtrak Concourse | Amtrak tickets, transfer to 34th Street–Penn Station (IND Eighth Avenue Line) station; exit to 33rd Street, connection to Exit and Connecting concourses |
| UC | NJT Concourse | NJT tickets, exit to 31st Street, connect to LIRR and Hilton concourses |
| LC | West End Concourse | Amtrak/LIRR tickets, transfer to 34th Street–Penn Station (IND Eighth Avenue Line) station; exit to 33rd Street, connection to Exit and Connecting concourses |
| LC | Exit Concourse | Exit to 31st Street, connection to Hilton, West End, and Connecting concourses |
| LC | Hilton Corridor | Exit to Seventh Avenue, connection to Exit, LIRR, Central, and NJT concourses |
| LC | Central Concourse | Tickets, connection to Connecting and Hilton concourses |
| LC | Connecting Concourse | Transfer to 34th Street–Penn Station (IRT Broadway–Seventh Avenue Line) station, connection to West End, LIRR, Central, and Exit concourses, to One Penn Plaza and 34th Street at north end |
| LC | LIRR Concourse | LIRR tickets, connection to NJT and Hilton concourses |
| P Platform level | Track 21 | LIRR toward Long Island → |
| P Platform level | Island platform (Platform 11) |
| P Platform level | Track 20 | LIRR toward Long Island → |
| P Platform level | Track 19 | LIRR toward Long Island → |
| P Platform level | Island platform (Platform 10) |
| P Platform level | Track 18 | LIRR toward Long Island → |
| P Platform level | Island platform (Platform 9); Track 17 only |
| P Platform level | Track 17 | LIRR toward Long Island → |
| P Platform level | Track 16 | ← Amtrak/NJ Transit/LIRR → |
| P Platform level | Island platform (Platform 8) |
| P Platform level | Track 15 | ← Amtrak/NJ Transit/LIRR → |
| P Platform level | Track 14 | ← Amtrak/NJ Transit/LIRR → |
| P Platform level | Island platform (Platform 7) |
| P Platform level | Track 13 | ← Amtrak/NJ Transit/LIRR → |
| P Platform level | Track 12 | ← Amtrak/NJ Transit/LIRR → |
| P Platform level | Island platform (Platform 6) |
| P Platform level | Track 11 | ← Amtrak/NJ Transit → |
| P Platform level | Track 10 | ← Amtrak/NJ Transit → |
| P Platform level | Island platform (Platform 5) |
| P Platform level | Track 9 | ← Amtrak/NJ Transit → |
| P Platform level | Track 8 | ← Amtrak/NJ Transit → |
| P Platform level | Island platform (Platform 4) |
| P Platform level | Track 7 | ← Amtrak/NJ Transit → |
| P Platform level | Track 6 | ← Amtrak/NJ Transit → |
| P Platform level | Island platform (Platform 3) |
| P Platform level | Track 5 | ← Amtrak/NJ Transit |
| P Platform level | Track 4 | ← NJ Transit toward New Jersey |
| P Platform level | Island platform (Platform 2) |
| P Platform level | Track 3 | ← NJ Transit toward New Jersey |
| P Platform level | Track 2 | ← NJ Transit toward New Jersey |
| P Platform level | Island platform (Platform 1) |
| P Platform level | Track 1 | ← NJ Transit toward New Jersey |

=== Tracks and surrounding infrastructure ===
Penn Station is configured with 11 platforms, 21 tracks, and four interlockings. The station's platforms and tracks are numbered from south to north. Tracks 1–4 are stub-end tracks ending at the eastern end of the platform and are used exclusively by NJ Transit, as they do not connect to the East River Tunnels. The remaining tracks 5 through 21 are through tracks with connections at both ends. In normal operations, Amtrak and NJ Transit share tracks 5–12, all three railroads share tracks 13–16, and the LIRR has the exclusive use of tracks 17–21 on the north side of the station.

The station is accessed via seven single-track tunnels: two North River Tunnels under the Hudson River, four East River Tunnels under the East River, and one shorter Empire Tunnel under the West Side of Manhattan. Each under-river tunnel is approximately 3 miles long, while the Empire Tunnel is approximately 0.3 miles long. The interlockings that control the station complex are designated 'A', 'C', 'JO', and 'KN'. On the west side of the station, 'A' and 'KN' interlockings route trains to and from the North River Tunnels, the Empire Tunnel, and the West Side Yard. On the east side, two interlockings ('C' and 'JO') route trains to and from the four East River tunnels; each interlocking connects two of the tunnel tracks to only 17 of the 21 platform tracks, as tracks 1–4 do not connect to the east.

From the east, the East River Tunnels' lines 1 and 2 (the more southerly tubes) can only access tracks 5–17 and are used by most Amtrak and NJ Transit trains, while the East River Tunnels' lines 3 and 4 (the more northerly tubes) can only access tracks 14–21 and are mostly used by LIRR. From the west, the North River Tunnels can access tracks 1–19, while the Empire Connection can only access tracks 1–9 and the LIRR's West Side Yard can only access tracks 10–21.

All station tracks are powered by 12 kV overhead wire. Tracks 5–21 also have 750 V DC third rail. Due to the lack of proper ventilation in the tunnels and station, only electric locomotives and dual-mode locomotives are scheduled to enter Penn Station. Diesel-only NJT trains terminate at Hoboken Terminal or Newark Penn Station, and diesel-only LIRR trains terminate at or prior to Long Island City. The established throughput capacity of the tunnels is 24–25 trains per hour in each direction for the North River Tunnels and 20–21 trains per hour in the peak direction for the East River Tunnels.

Trains on track 18 open their doors only on the north side (platform 10).

==== 2017–2018 service disruptions and track improvements ====
Since the early 2010s, Amtrak had planned to fix the deteriorating rails and infrastructure around Penn Station, but due to the prioritization of other projects, applied only minimal fixes. In early 2017, this culminated in numerous power outages, derailments, and delays due to track maintenance delays. There were frequent service disruptions to train schedules caused by the deterioration of its tracks and their supporting infrastructure, as well as in those of the East River and North River tunnels that respectively connect the station to Long Island and New Jersey.

A string of early 2017 service disruptions started on March 23, 2017, when an Acela train derailed, causing delays for the day. On April 3, a NJ Transit train derailed at a known problem site, where repairs had been deferred. This caused four days of reduced service along the Northeast Corridor for both Amtrak and NJ Transit, because the incident damaged the switch that connects Tracks 1–8 to the North River tunnels. This closure caused a cascading failure, delaying Amtrak and Long Island Rail Road trains on the unaffected tracks.

On April 14, a New Jersey Transit train became stuck in the North River tunnels, causing the station to grow crowded with waiting passengers. After an Amtrak police officer used a Taser on a man who was acting disruptively, rumors of gunshots sparked a stampede that injured 16 people. Following the stampede, U.S. Senator Chuck Schumer called on Amtrak to centralize law enforcement response.

As a result of these incidents, the Long Island Rail Road had proposed taking over Penn Station from Amtrak to improve maintenance, and New Jersey has suggested withholding state payments to Amtrak. Amtrak has discussed accelerating major maintenance work, even at the cost of further disruptions, to more quickly stabilize infrastructure and decrease more future incidents that could potentially cause even greater disruption.

On April 28, 2017, Amtrak announced that it would perform some track maintenance during the summer over a period of one and a half months. Five tracks were closed for repairs as part of the reconstruction work, severely reducing track capacity in a situation media outlets deemed "the summer of hell". Many affected NJ Transit passengers were diverted to take the PATH instead. Some Amtrak trains from the Empire Corridor were routed to Grand Central instead of Penn Station. Regular service resumed on September 5, 2017.

Amtrak made further improvements to Penn Station's trackage in summer 2018. As a result, some Empire Corridor trains were rerouted again to Grand Central. The Lake Shore Limited and Cardinal to Chicago were truncated or rerouted because of this work.

33rd St to 34th St subway cross-section
| 11th Av | 10th & 9th Avs are skipped | Farley Building & Moynihan Train Hall | 8th Av | Madison Square; Garden | 7th Av | Storefronts | 6th Av & Broadway | | 5th & Madison Avs are skipped | Park Av |
| mezzanine | 10th & 9th Avs are skipped | train hall | A/C/E | concourse | 1/2/3 | Former Gimbel's passageway | mezz | PATH | 5th & Madison Avs are skipped | 6/<6> |
| mezzanine | 10th & 9th Avs are skipped | conc | mezzanine | concourse | mezzanine | | N/Q/R/W | | 5th & Madison Avs are skipped |
| 7/<7> | 10th & 9th Avs are skipped | Penn Station (platform level) | | | | | B/D/F/<F>/M | | 5th & Madison Avs are skipped |

== Planning and redevelopment ==
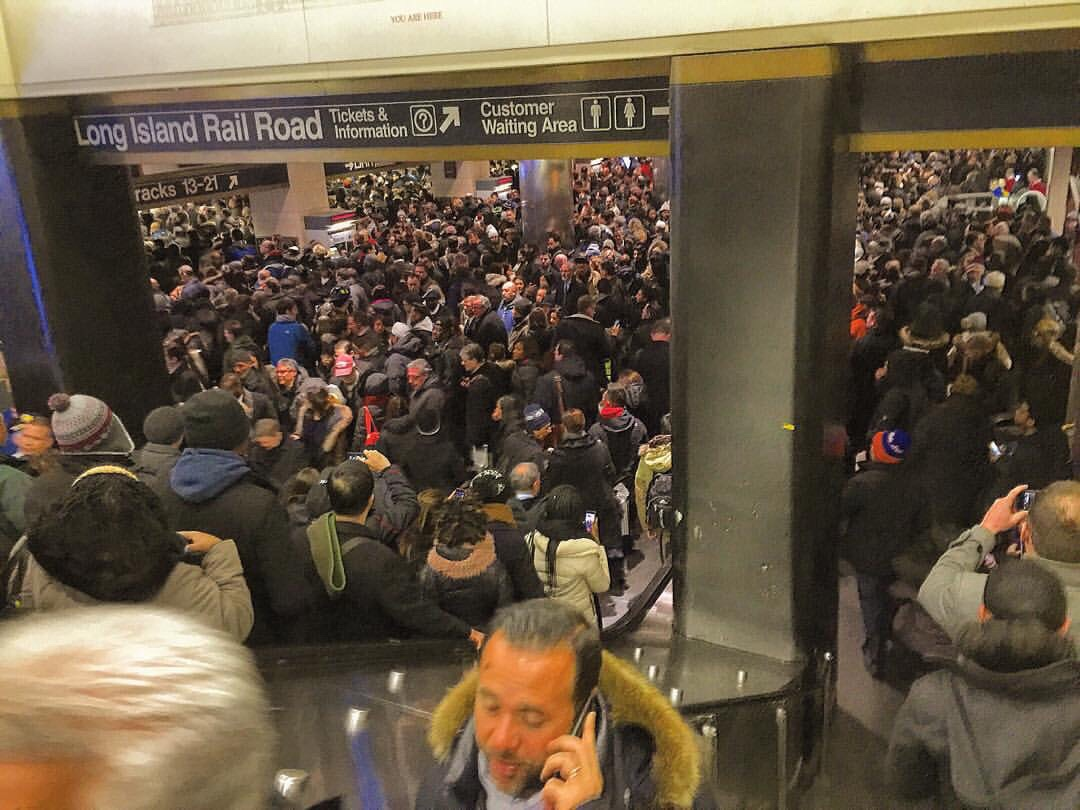
Passenger congestion in the LIRR concourse, 2016

Resurgence of train ridership in the 21st century pushed the current Pennsylvania Station under Madison Square Garden to capacity, leading to several proposals to renovate or rebuild the station, often characterized as correcting for the 1960s demolition of the original facility. The Times noted in 2025 that a succession of elected officials over several decades—including Governors Pataki, Spitzer, Cuomo, and Hochul—had made gestures at reconstructing the station, though no such reconstruction ultimately materialized. Among the reasons, the Times cited the controlling interests of multiple transit companies—Amtrak, which owns the station, along with NJ Transit and the MTA, which operate within it—and the influence of James Dolan, whose company owns Madison Square Garden and the air rights above the station. Several of the failed plans were entangled with questions of if and how to move the Garden; in 2008, Eliot Spitzer induced the Garden to sign a memorandum of understanding to move one block west as part of a planned station reconstruction, although his plan fizzled after he was felled by a prostitution scandal only a week later.

In 2013, the Regional Plan Association and Municipal Art Society formed the Alliance for a New Penn Station, advocating for limiting the extension of Madison Square Garden's operating permit to ten years and soliciting designs to move the arena. Garden officials called the plans "pie-in-the-sky", but on July 24, 2013, the New York City Council voted 47–1 to give the Garden a ten-year operating permit, after which the owners would have to move or seek permission anew. In January 2016, at the same time he announced the development of Moynihan Train Hall, New York governor Andrew Cuomo announced he would solicit proposals for the redevelopment of the station under the Garden as a public-private partnership called the Empire Station Complex.

In June 2023, nearing the end of the ten-year permit granted in 2013, the MTA, Amtrak, and NJ Transit filed a report stating Madison Square Garden was no longer compatible with Penn Station, saying, "MSG's existing configuration and property boundaries impose severe constraints." On September 14, 2023, the New York City Council voted 48–0 to renew the operating permit for Madison Square Garden for five years, the shortest-ever granted to the Garden by the city.

=== Station reconstruction plans in the 2020s ===
In April 2021, MTA officials under governor Andrew Cuomo proposed two options to reconstruct the Penn Station building under Madison Square Garden, to be financed by the development of 10 new office and residential towers in the surrounding neighborhood: one retained the existing two-level concourse, the other envisioned a taller single-level concourse with a glass atrium in the former midblock taxiway. Opponents alleged the tower development would provide a disproportionate tax advantage to real-estate firm Vornado Realty Trust.

In November 2021, after Cuomo resigned, governor Kathy Hochul attempted to advance reconstruction by selecting the one-level plan and slightly reducing the size of the office tower development, and the administration announced FXCollaborative as designer in September 2022 with the assistance of John McAslan. But in February 2023, Vornado declared it would no longer invest in new office space due to lack of demand following the COVID-19 pandemic, and that June Hochul announced Penn Station reconstruction would be "decoupled" from any office tower development.

In April 2025, transportation secretary Sean Duffy announced the U.S. Department of Transportation would take over reconstruction from the MTA, and he selected former New York City Transit Authority president Andy Byford to lead the effort. In response, Hochul said that New York State would no longer pay $1.3 billion that it had previously expected to contribute. Duffy announced later that year that work would begin in 2027 and would cost $7 billion, and in May 2026 Amtrak selected out of three finalists a joint venture of Skanska and Halmar International as developer and Vishaan Chakrabarti's Practice for Architecture and Urbanism (PAU) as lead design architect. The approved plan would keep Madison Square Garden in place and rebuild the passenger facilities beneath it. In June 2026, Amtrak and Penn Transformation Partners released renderings for an approximately $8 billion redesign of Penn Station that would retain Madison Square Garden while creating a larger, light-filled station inspired by the original Pennsylvania Station. Later that month, a pre-development agreement (PDA) was finalized, with the project estimated to break ground by the end of 2027. Amtrak also offered to re-add the MTA as a partner in the station's reconstruction, but the MTA declined.

=== Gateway Program ===
The Gateway Program is the planned expansion and renovation of the Northeast Corridor between Newark, New Jersey, and New York City to alleviate the bottleneck by allowing for refurbishment of the existing North River Tunnels and ultimately expanding the right-of-way to four tracks, doubling the capacity of Penn Station; two new tunnels under the Hudson River would add 24 cross-Hudson trains per hour, for 48 total.

The Gateway Program was unveiled in 2011, one year after the cancellation of the somewhat-similar Access to the Region's Core (ARC) project, and was originally projected to cost $13.5 billion and take 14 years to build. Construction of a "tunnel box" to preserve right-of-way on Manhattan's West Side began in September 2013. In 2015, Amtrak said that damage done to the existing trans-Hudson tunnels by Hurricane Sandy had made their replacement urgent.

A draft environmental impact statement on the Hudson tunnel project was released in July 2017, but the first Trump administration stalled consideration of it. Unblocking the project was a stated priority of the Biden administration, and the project was approved in May 2021. Federal funding was included in Biden's Bipartisan Infrastructure Bill, which became law in November 2021, and in 2023 Biden announced a federal contribution of $11 billion of the $16.1 billion price tag, with the states of New York and New Jersey splitting the rest. Construction of the new Hudson River tunnel began in late 2023 and was underway as of 2026, despite a brief funding freeze by the second Trump administration that was overturned by judges. The new tunnel is scheduled to open in 2035, with refurbishment of the old tunnels and increased capacity by 2038.

=== Southern expansion ===
In January 2020, Governor Andrew Cuomo unveiled a proposed southern annex to Penn Station, part of his vision for the Empire Station Complex. The annex would include eight new tracks with four platforms and would involve demolishing the entire block bounded by 30th and 31st streets between Seventh and Eighth avenues, directly south of the existing station, as well as parts of the two blocks to the east and west. The new tracks would connect to and take advantage of the new capacity provided by the Hudson River tunnels built as part of the Gateway Program. The necessity of new tracks has been debated by regional advocacy groups who suggest that service improvements to enable regional through-running could similarly boost capacity. The southern terminal, which could cost as much as $16.7 billion, never proceeded; in March 2025 Governor Kathy Hochul said she no longer supported demolition of the block, and in August 2025 Amtrak said it was abandoning the expansion in favor of reconstructing the existing station and exploring other capacity improvements such as through-running.

== See also ==
- Pennsylvania Tunnel and Terminal Railroad
- Transportation in New York City
