= Pennsylvania Plaza =

Building complex in Manhattan, New York

Coordinates: 40°45′02″N 73°59′34″W

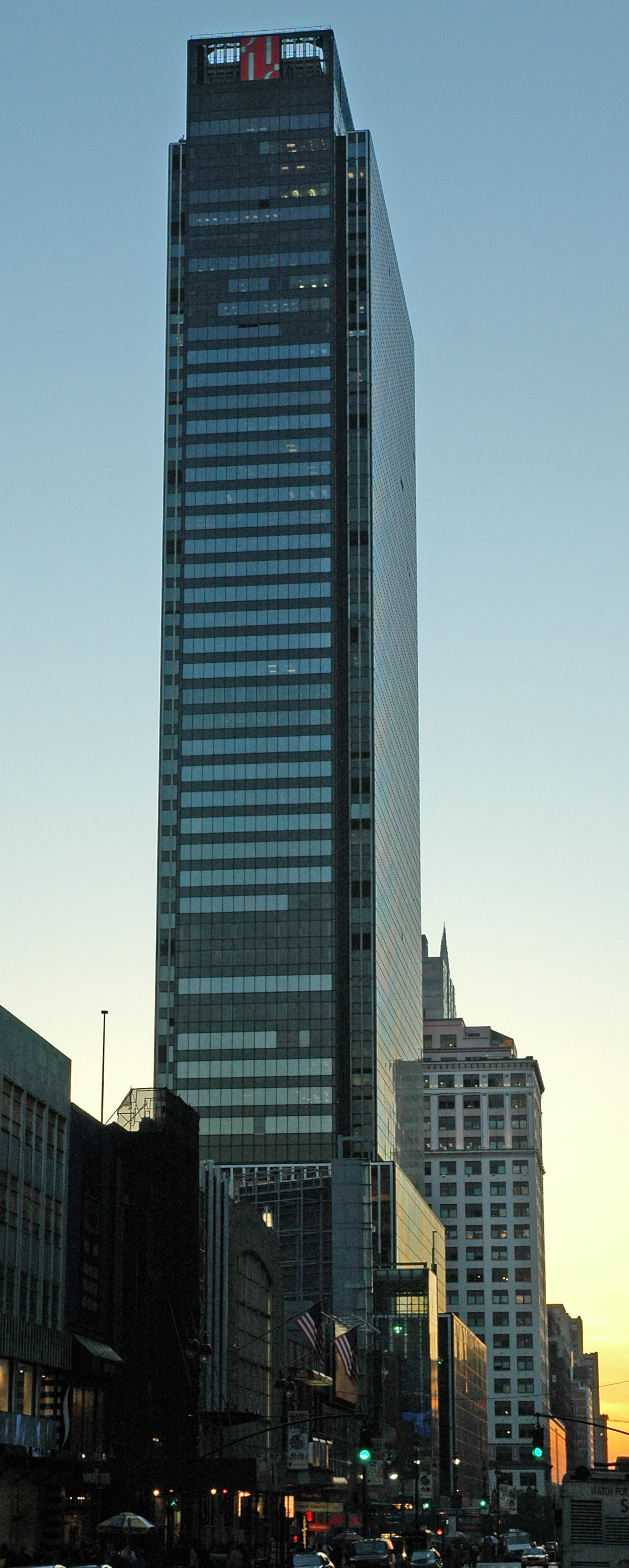
One Penn Plaza in May 2005

Pennsylvania Plaza (commonly known as Penn Plaza) is a complex of 14 buildings in Midtown Manhattan, New York City, including New York Penn Station and Madison Square Garden. It is one of the busier transportation, business, and retailing areas in Manhattan.

== Buildings ==
Buildings using the Penn Plaza address include:

- One Penn Plaza
- Two Penn Plaza, the global headquarters of Major League Soccer beginning in May 2026
- 4 Pennsylvania Plaza - Madison Square Garden
- 5 Penn Plaza - office building on Eighth Avenue
- 7 Penn Plaza (370 Seventh Avenue)
- 9 Penn Plaza - houses Nick and Stef's Steakhouse NYC
- 11 Penn Plaza
- 225 West 34th Street (14 Penn Plaza)
- 15 Penn Plaza - proposed

The numbering of the Penn Plaza addresses does not follow a consistent pattern.

== Development ==
Development involved the destruction, beginning in 1963, of the original McKim, Mead and White–designed Penn Station (1910), a revered piece of New York architecture. Its replacements were what architects and civic purists regard as mediocre office and entertainment structures. The demolition of the first Penn Station led to the city's landmarks preservation movement and helped save another landmark of railway architecture, Grand Central Terminal.

Two Penn Plaza (2026)

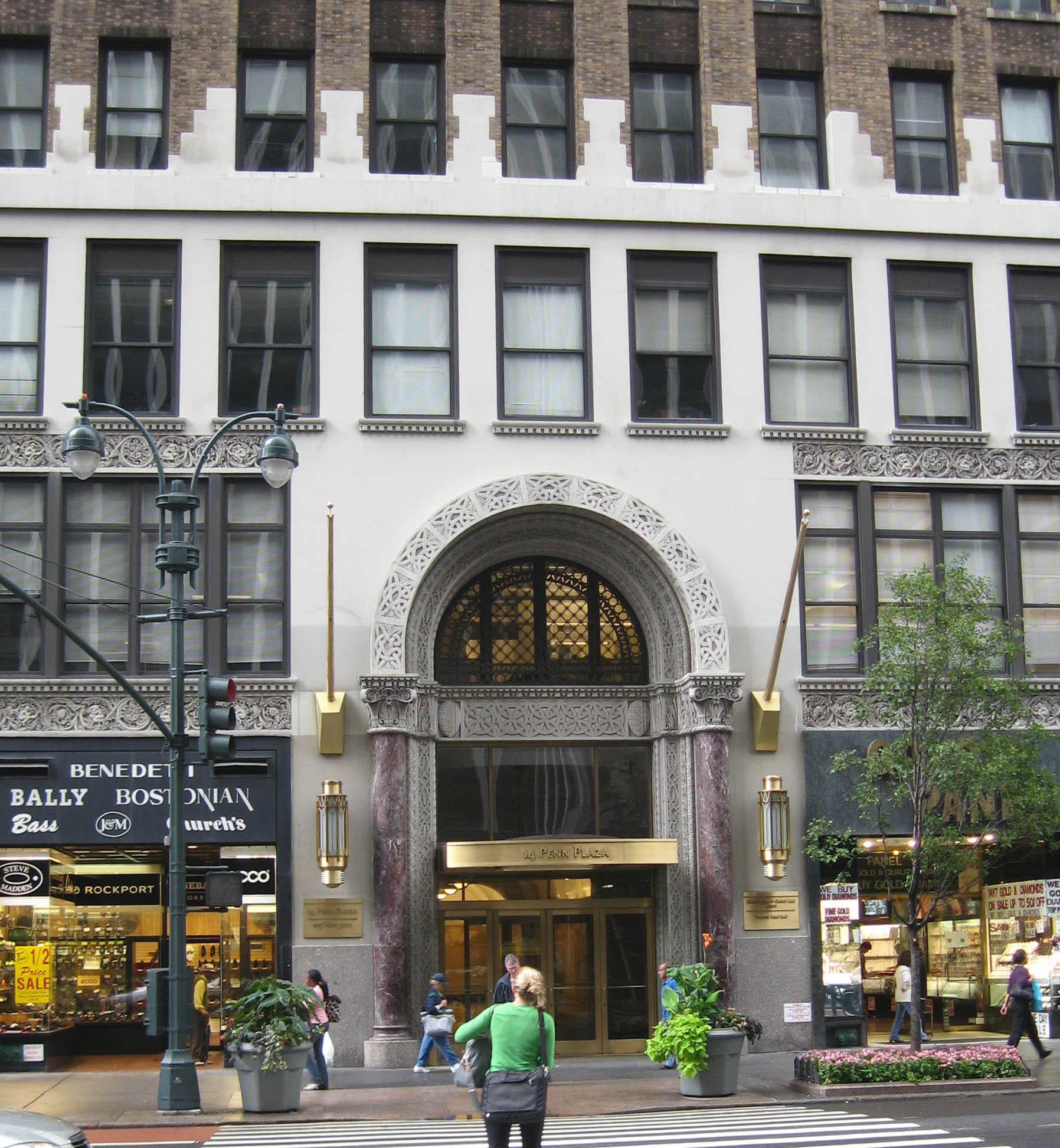
14 Penn Plaza in September 2013

== Tenants ==
=== 1 Penn Plaza ===
- Cisco Systems, a networking and telephony company, occupies part of the 6th and the entire 9th floor.
- North Highland, a global consulting firm on the 32nd floor
- Dun & Bradstreet has an office on the 44th floor.
- Expeditors has an office on the 46th floor.
- Gibbons P.C., a law firm, occupies the entire 37th floor.
- Insight Enterprises has offices on the 19th floor.
- Lumen Technologies has an office on the 51st floor
- MarkLogic, an enterprise NoSQL software vendor, has a suite of offices on the 42nd floor.
- Mitel Networks, a telecommunications provider, occupies a suite of offices on the 25th floor.
- Polycom, a telecommunications equipment manufacturer, occupies the 48th floor.
- Riverbed Technology occupies a suite of offices on the 17th floor.
- Samsung Electronics America occupies the 26th floor.
- URS Corporation New York City Office occupies most of the 6th and 7th floors of One Penn Plaza.
- WSP USA, formerly Parsons Brinckerhoff, is headquartered in One Penn Plaza and occupies the 4th and 5th floors.
- The Independent has its US headquarters in the building.

=== 2 Penn Plaza ===
- Information Builders
- MSG Entertainment
- Schoology
- Verizon
- Major League Soccer

=== 11 Penn Plaza ===
- AMC Global Media The bank vault in this building was designed by Frederick S. Holmes.
