= One Penn Plaza =

Office skyscraper in Manhattan, New York

Penn 1
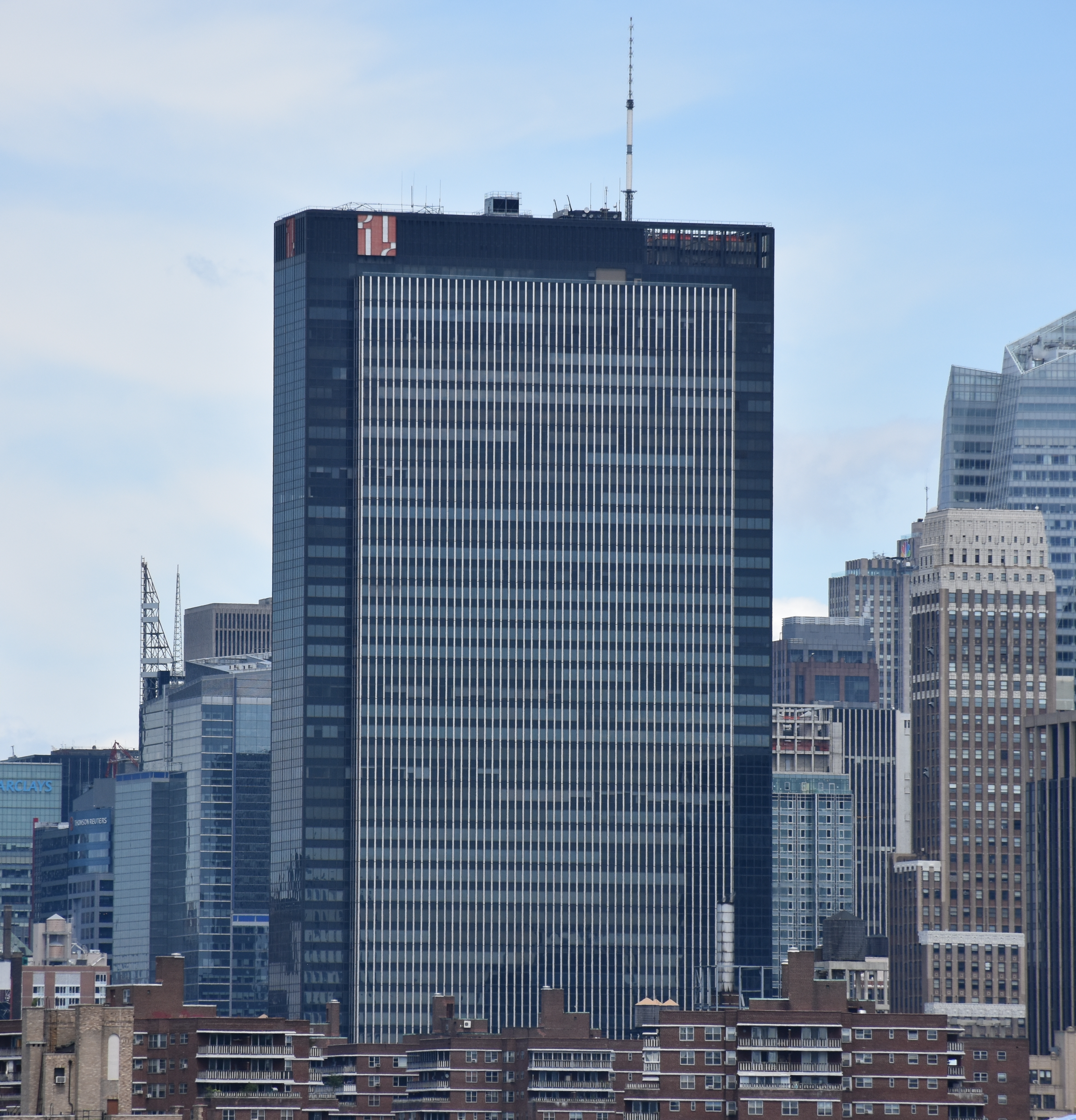
- Looking North
- Interactive map of the Penn 1 area
- Alternative names: One Penn Plaza

General information
- Status: Completed
- Type: Commercial and office
- Location: 250 West 34th Street; Manhattan, New York
- Coordinates: 40°45′05″N 73°59′33″W
- Construction started: 1970
- Completed: 1972
- Owner: Vornado Realty Trust

Height
- Roof: 229 m (751 ft)

Technical details
- Floor count: 57
- Floor area: 2,586,525 ft^{2} (240,296.0 m^{2})
- Lifts/elevators: 44

Design and construction
- Architect: Kahn & Jacobs
- Structural engineer: James Ruderman

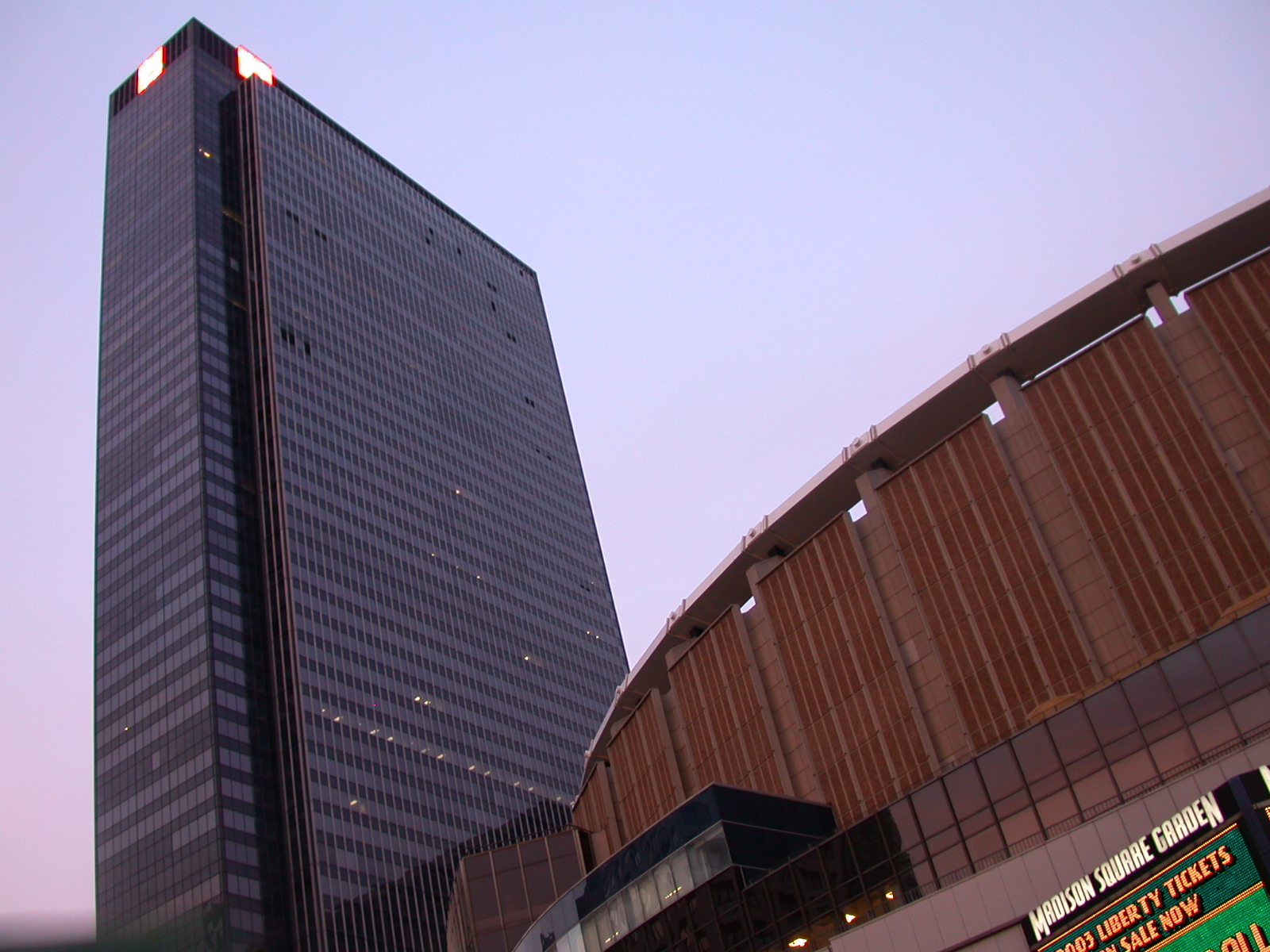
Location next to Madison Square Garden

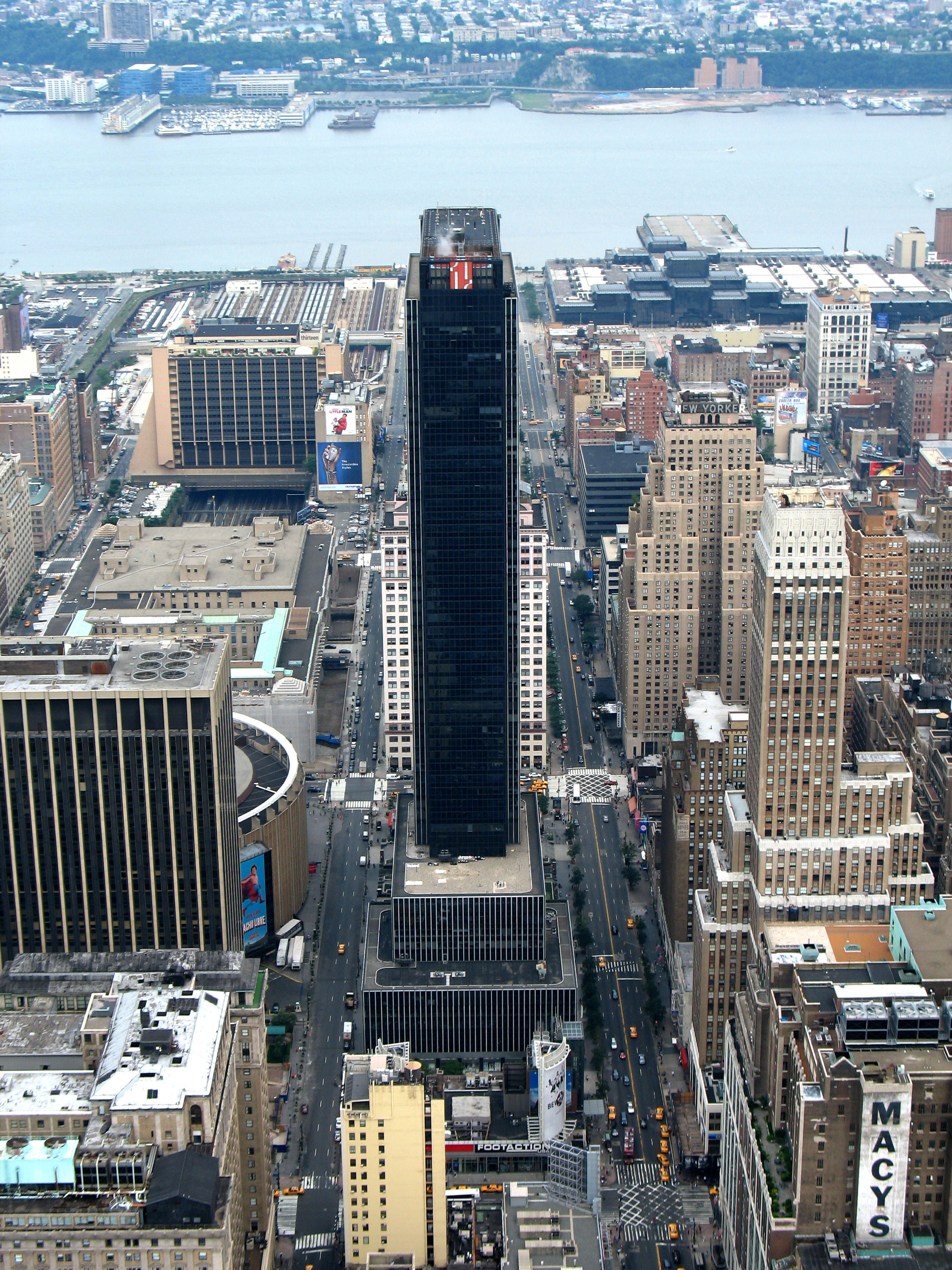
One Penn Plaza seen from the east

Penn 1 (originally One Penn Plaza and stylized as PENN 1) is a skyscraper in the Midtown Manhattan neighborhood of New York City. It is located between 33rd Street and 34th Street, west of Seventh Avenue, and adjacent to Pennsylvania Station and Madison Square Garden. One Penn Plaza is the tallest building in the Pennsylvania Plaza complex of office buildings, hotels, and entertainment facilities.

The building is assigned its own ZIP Code, 10119; it was one of 41 buildings in Manhattan that had their own ZIP Codes as of 2019.

== Architecture ==
The skyscraper was designed by Kahn & Jacobs and completed in 1972. It reaches 750 feet (230 m) with 57 floors. The tower has three setbacks: at the 7th, 14th, and 55th floors. From its location on the west side of Manhattan, most south, west and north-facing tenants have unobstructed views of the Hudson River. One Penn Plaza is built with structural steel and concrete, with grey solar glass and anodized aluminum on the outside walls. Mechanical rooms are located on the 12th and 13th floors; placing these on lower floors instead of the top of the building allowed equipment to be installed before the structural steel framework was complete and shaved six to nine months off the building's construction schedule.

The building has 14 entrances and 44 elevators in seven banks. An underground parking garage provides 695 spaces for cars and is accessible from both 33rd and 34th Streets. Direct passageways at each end of the building provide underground connections (weekdays only) to the Long Island Rail Road concourse of Pennsylvania Station, which is located one block to the south. The ground floor is leased to several commercial tenants, The top floors include a retail space of 142,000 square feet (13,200 m^{2}) which was formerly occupied by a three-story Kmart store (closed in 2020), and before that a Woolworth.

A public plaza and fountain are located on the west end of the building. Unlike traditional fountains, steam is dispensed in the winter and fog is dispensed in the summer to prevent water from splashing out during gusty wind conditions.

== History ==
One Penn Plaza is currently owned by Vornado Realty Trust. It was previously owned by Helmsley-Spear Inc., which sold the building for $420 million in the late 1990s.

In 2009, plans were made to install a cogeneration plant in order to heat the building more efficiently. By 2010, it was reported that when the new plant was activated, it cut the building's carbon output nearly in half. The lobby was refurbished in 1995 and underwent another refurbishment in 2019. The building had been rebranded as Penn 1 by 2021. A restaurant called The Landing opened on the second floor of the rebranded Penn 1 in 2022.

More than 80 percent of the action in the 2011 independent film Margin Call was shot on the 42nd floor of the building, which had recently been vacated by a trading firm.

== Tenants ==
- Cisco Systems, a networking and telephony company, occupies part of the 6th and the entire 9th floor.
- North Highland, a global consulting firm on the 32nd floor
- Cookie Jar Entertainment has an office in Suite 3324.
- Dun & Bradstreet has an office on the 44th floor.
- Expeditors has an office on the 46th floor.
- Gibbons P.C., a law firm, occupies the entire 37th floor.
- Insight Enterprises has offices on the 19th floor.
- Lumen Technologies has an office on the 51st floor
- MarkLogic, an enterprise NoSQL software vendor, has a suite of offices on the 42nd floor.
- Milliman, an actuarial consulting firm, occupies a suite of offices on the 38th floor.
- Mitel Networks, a telecommunications provider, occupies a suite of offices on the 25th floor.
- Polycom, a telecommunications equipment manufacturer, occupies the 48th floor.
- Riverbed Technology occupies a suite of offices on the 17th floor.
- Samsung Electronics America occupies the 26th floor.
- URS Corporation New York City Office occupies most of the 6th and 7th floors of One Penn Plaza.
- WSP USA, formerly Parsons Brinckerhoff, is headquartered in One Penn Plaza and occupies the 4th and 5th floors.
- The Independent has its US headquarters in the building.

Additionally, Publicis formerly occupied the fifth floor and part of the fourth floor.

== See also ==
- List of tallest buildings in New York City
