= Arthur V. Sheridan =

Bronx Commissioner of Public Works
- In office May 10, 1942 – June 19, 1952
- Preceded by: Robert L. Moran

Personal details
- Born: 1888
- Died: June 19, 1952 (aged 63–64) Bronx, New York, US
- Resting place: Woodlawn Cemetery
- Education: City University of New York; Columbia University

Arthur V. Sheridan (1888 – June 19, 1952) was a Bronx engineer who served as Bronx Borough Commissioner of Public Works from 1942 to 1952 under Bronx Borough President James J. Lyons and Arterial Coordinator Robert Moses.

== Early life ==
A native of New York City, Sheridan attended the City University of New York and studied engineering at Columbia University.

== Public service engineering career ==
Sheridan started his career working on a federal engineering project, earning himself presidential commendations from both Herbert Hoover and Franklin D. Roosevelt. In 1934, Sheridan was named Chief Engineer of the Bronx by Bronx Borough President James J. Lyons. In 1942, Lyons appointed him from that position to the position of Bronx Borough Commissioner of Public Works.

== Career outside of public service ==
Sheridan served as president of numerous professional and community groups. From 1928 to 1930, he was the president of the New York Society of Professional Engineers. Sheridan was a founding member and from 1937 to 1938 served as the second president of the National Society of Professional Engineers after David B. Steinman. He also served as president of the Bronx Rotary Club. Sheridan also belonged to both the American Legion and the New York Athletic Club.

During World War I, Sheridan served in the American Expeditionary Forces and as a military consultant during World War II.

In addition, Sheridan edited The American Engineer for 15 years, lectured at Yale, and taught engineering at New York University and Manhattan College.

Outside of the engineering field, Sheridan lectured on history and philosophy.

== Death ==
Sheridan died in a car collision in the Bronx on June 19, 1952, en route to pick up his 11-year-old son to drive back to their home in Lake Mohawk, New Jersey, less than two weeks before his retirement as Borough Commissioner of Public Works on July 1.

He is interred in Woodlawn Cemetery in The Bronx.

== Legacy ==
Sheridan Boulevard (originally the Sheridan Expressway) is named after Sheridan. This road is 1.4 miles long and connects the Bruckner and Cross Bronx Expressways in order to provide a route for commercial vehicles, which cannot travel on the Bronx River Parkway. In the late 2010s, the Sheridan Expressway was converted into a boulevard.

In addition to the highway, Sheridan has a scholarship named after him at Manhattan College.

== Publications ==
- Sheridan, Arthur V. (April 1944). "Whither Engineering Education". The Journal of Engineering Education. 34 (8): 562–571.
- "Three Centuries in the Bronx"
- Sheridan, Arthur V. (1947). Traffic in the Bronx.
