= Bridge Apartments =

Apartment building complex in Manhattan, New York

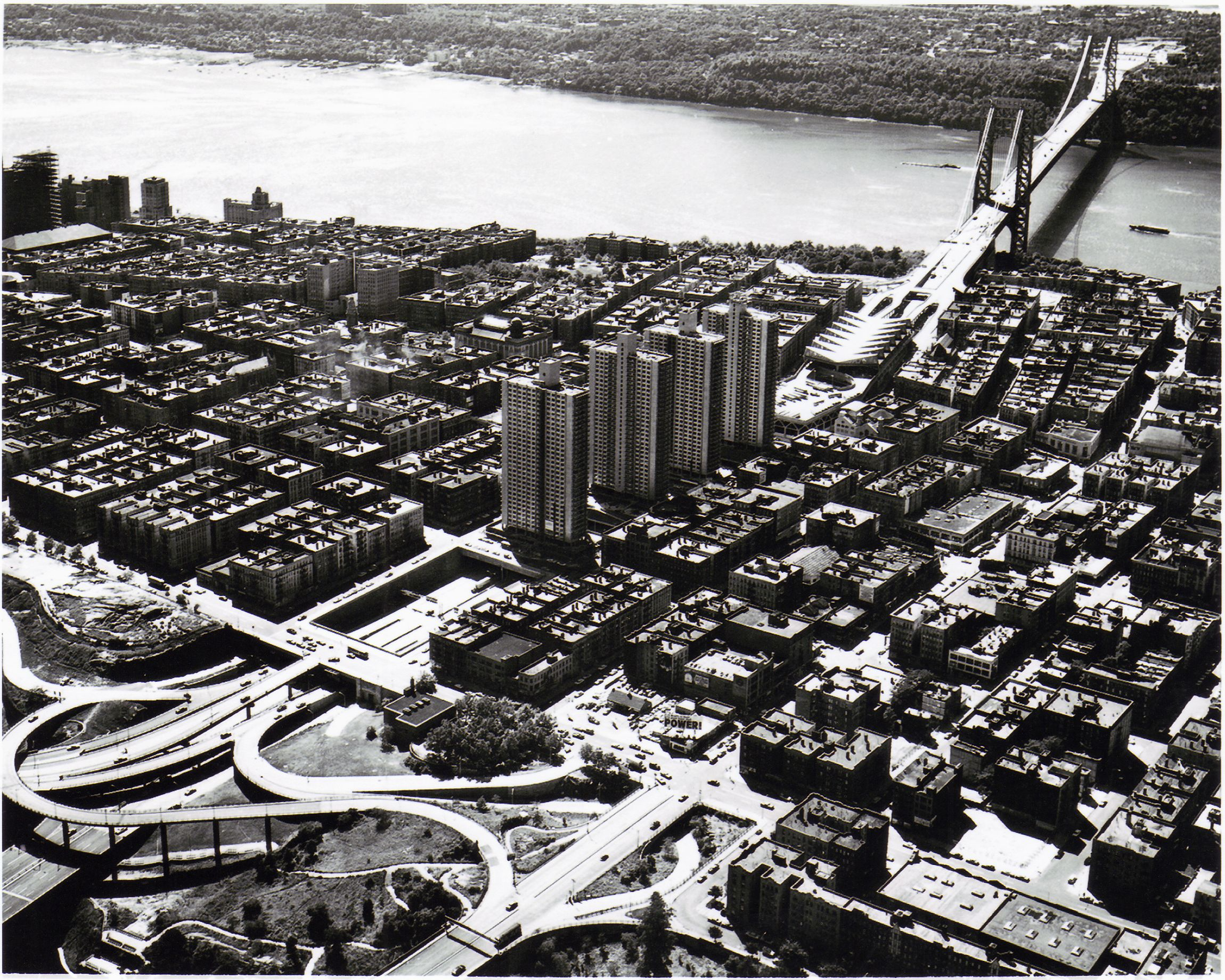
- Aerial view of the buildings in 1965
- Interactive map of the Bridge Apartments area

General information
- Location: Washington Heights, Manhattan, New York City, United States
- Coordinates: 40.8476°N 73.9349°W
- Construction started: 1961
- Opened: 1964
- Cost: $19 million

Technical details
- Floor count: 32

Design and construction
- Architecture firm: Brown & Guenther

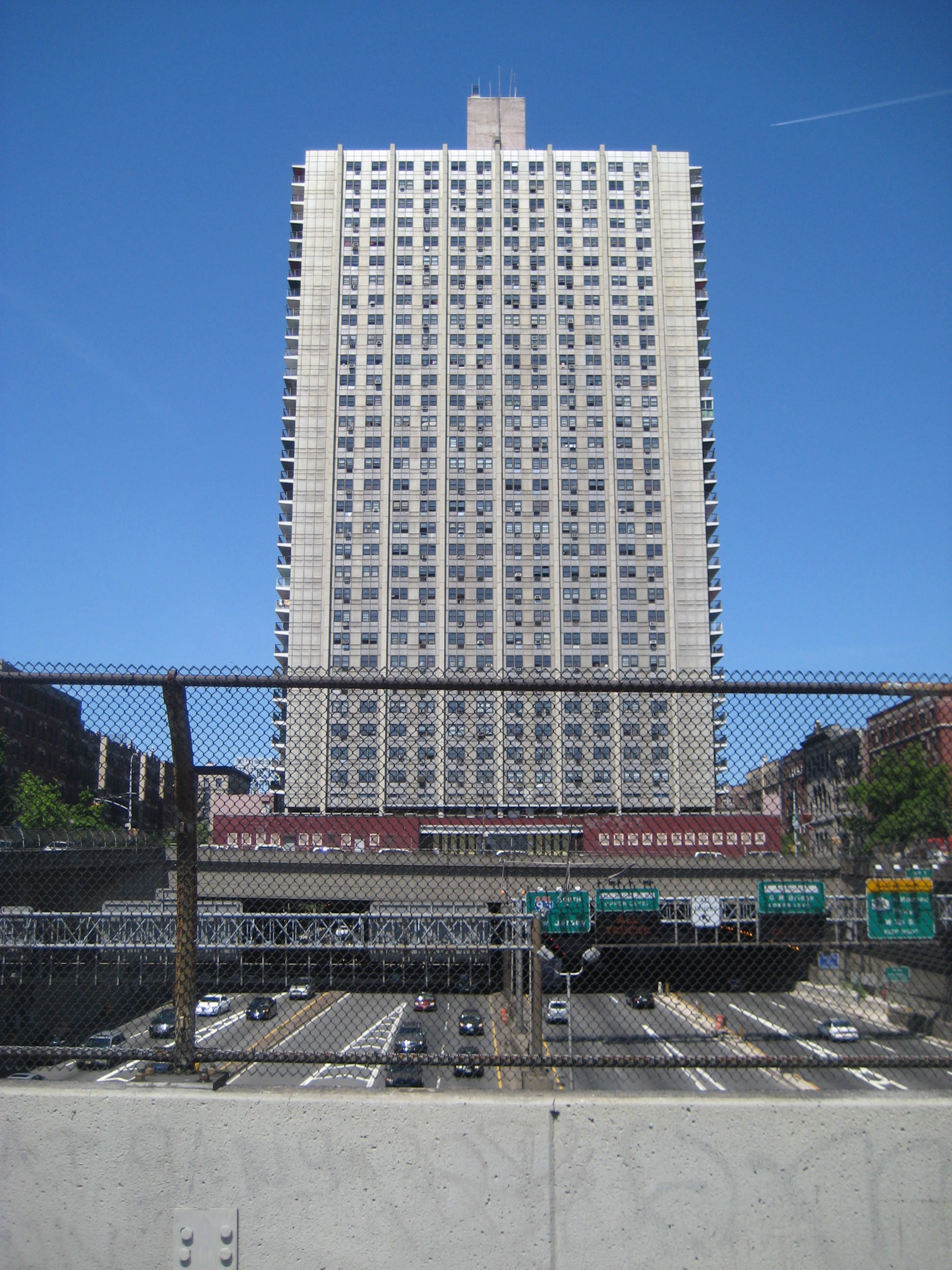
Apartment buildings over the Trans-Manhattan Expressway

The Bridge Apartments are four 32-story apartment buildings in the Washington Heights neighborhood of Manhattan, New York. Built between 1961 and 1964, they rise from concrete platforms directly above the Trans-Manhattan Expressway on its approach to the George Washington Bridge. About 4,000 people live in the four buildings, whose proximity to the highway has led to complaints about traffic noise and air pollution.

== Description ==
The Bridge Apartments comprise four high-rise buildings, each with 240 apartments for a total of 960. The second floor has laundry and community rooms; the lowest floor of residences is the third. The water and heating systems for the buildings sit below the ground floor.

The buildings are between 178th and 179th Streets on Audubon Avenue, St. Nicholas Avenue, and Wadsworth Avenue, in the neighborhood of Washington Heights in the New York City borough of Manhattan. They are built directly above the 12-lane Trans-Manhattan Expressway on its approach to the George Washington Bridge, on top of four concrete platforms that serve as the buildings' foundations. The spaces between the buildings above the expressway were left open for ventilation, as it would have been prohibitively costly to seal the highway completely and ventilate it through ducts running to the roofs of the buildings. Architecturally, the buildings' placement over an expressway have a precedent in the early 20th-century work of Le Corbusier and Antonio Sant'Elia.

== History ==
The air rights of the Trans-Manhattan Expressway were transferred from the Port Authority of New York and New Jersey (which manages the George Washington Bridge) to the city in 1960. The rights were purchased from the city by the Kratter Corporation for $1 million. Construction began on the buildings on December 20, 1961. Designed by the architectural firm Brown & Guenther, they were some of the first aluminum-sheathed high-rises in the world. At the time of construction, the total cost was estimated at over $19 million, of which more than $17 million came from a loan from the state's Mitchell–Lama Housing Program, under which the owners agree to limit rents in exchange for government subsidies. The air-rights scheme was considered innovative at the time.

The buildings opened in 1964, with the first tenants moving in during February, and their 960 middle-income apartments were quickly filled. Rents ranged from $92 to $179 a month. Soon after opening, residents complained of air pollution from the 150,000 vehicles that passed underneath the buildings each day. In 1967, Senator Robert F. Kennedy visited the apartments to speak with residents about the pollution issue. Kennedy proposed building a "vaporproof barrier" over the roadway. The towers were cited in the debate over the construction of the Lower Manhattan Expressway in the late 1960s, and a 1973 study commissioned by the Environmental Protection Agency found that the level of carbon monoxide exceeded federal guidelines and recommended sealing the lower levels of the building to keep out the dangerous gas.

In 1972, 300 tenants went on a rent strike to protest a planned increase in annual rent. The tenants were able to negotiate a smaller increase. The provisions of the Mitchell–Lama program expired after 20 years, allowing the development to be privatized, and in 1987, the buildings were purchased by a group of real-estate investors led by Mendel Schwimmer and David Bistricer.

As of 2004, the apartments housed 4,000 people, the majority of whom were working-class. Residents continued to complain of air and noise pollution, although the buildings remained popular.

In May 2026, concrete detached from the slabs beneath some of the buildings causing minor injuries while the structures were inspected for safety.

== See also ==
- Hudson Yards (development), another New York City real estate development built over an active transportation artery
- List of structures built on top of freeways
