= 178th–179th Street Tunnels =

Disused vehicular tunnels in New York City

Coordinates: 40°50′45″N 73°55′55″W

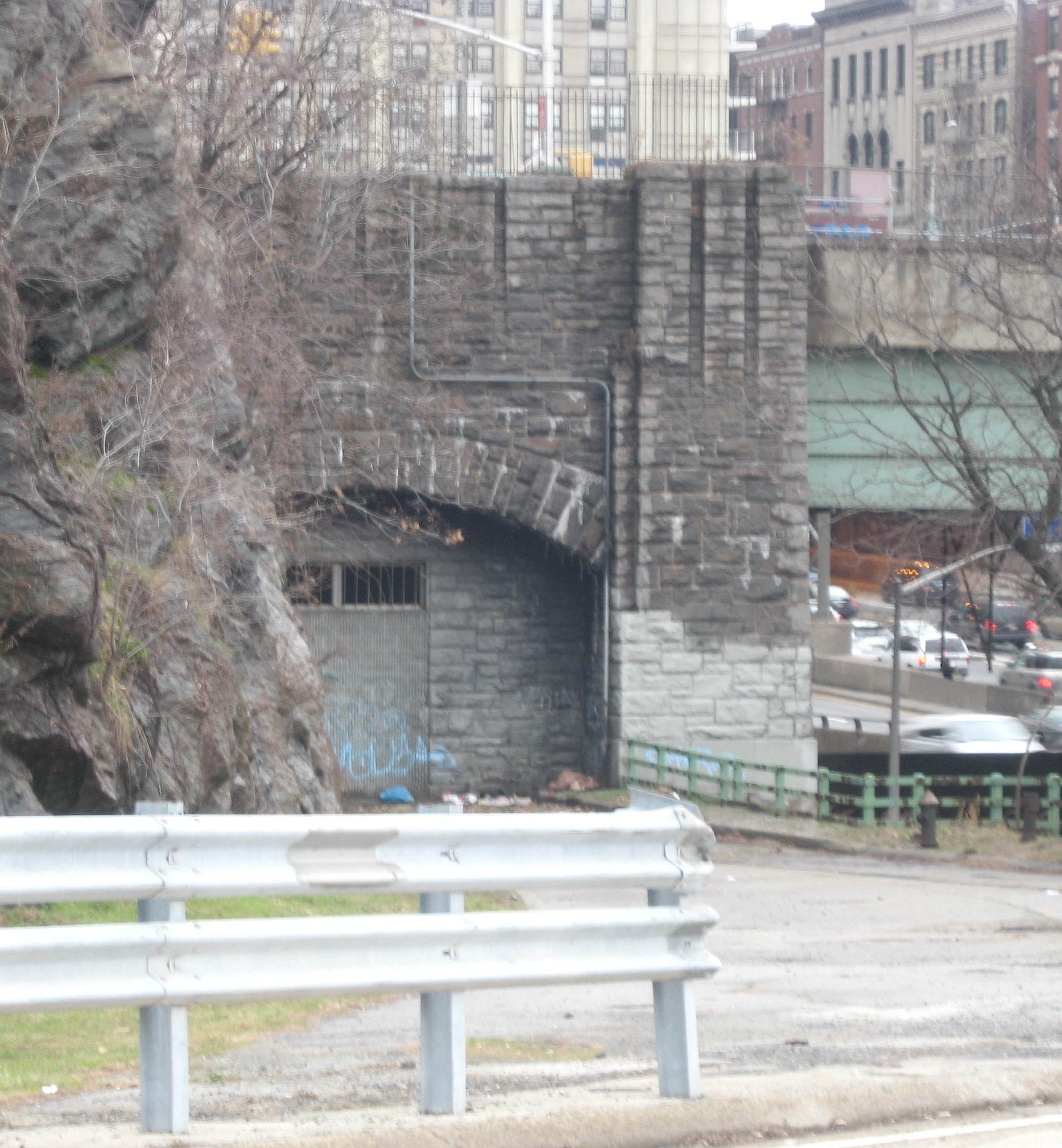
Eastern portal of 178th St tunnel

The 178th and 179th Street Tunnels are two disused vehicular tunnels in Upper Manhattan in New York City. Conceived and built under the auspices of Robert Moses, the twin tunnels have been superseded by the Trans-Manhattan Expressway in Washington Heights, built in the 1950s as a high-speed interstate bypass of the tunnels. By 1962, the two tunnels were out of commission; they are used today as storage space by the Port Authority of New York and New Jersey.

== History ==
The tunnels were built to carry traffic between the east side of Upper Manhattan and the George Washington Bridge (which opened in 1931) on the west side. Originally, only the 178th Street Tunnel was built, consisting of a 2,400-foot-long (730 m) tube with a width of 22 feet (6.7 m) and a clearance of 13.5 feet (4.1 m). It carried traffic to and from the George Washington Bridge at the western end. The eastern end split into two directions: a ramp to Amsterdam Avenue on the right and a 1,000-foot-long (300 m) driveway south to the Harlem River Drive on the left. Plans for the 178th Street Tunnel were approved in 1930, and the tunnel was nearly completed by early 1932. However, the opening of the tube was postponed for several years until traffic growth warranted the tunnel's opening, and the Port Authority resumed construction in 1938 for the 1939 New York World's Fair. After delays related to the construction of the Harlem River Drive ramp, the 178th Street Tunnel opened on June 27, 1940, serving both directions of traffic. Due to labor shortages and low traffic during World War II, the tunnel was closed in May 1942, reopening in November 1945.

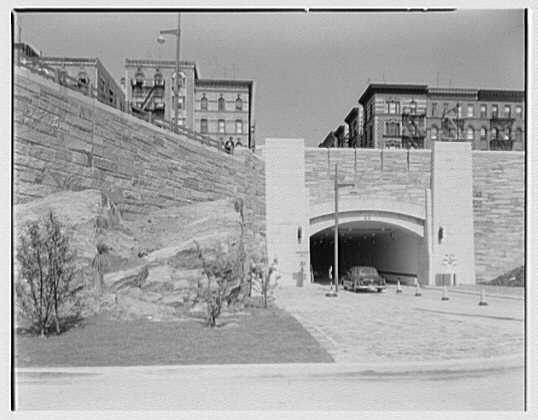
One of the tunnels under the Bronx-George Washington Bridge in 1952

While the 179th Street Tunnel had been planned along with its counterpart in 1930, engineers waited until the traffic loads demanded the opening of a new tunnel. By the late 1940s, the 178th Street Tunnel was frequently congested. Construction began on the 179th Street Tunnel in June 1949. The work involved constructing the Highbridge Interchange, which contained ramps from the 178th Street Tunnel to the Harlem River Drive, Amsterdam Avenue, and the Washington Bridge across the Harlem River, as well as corresponding ramps from these roads to the 179th Street Tunnel. The ramp from the 178th Street Tunnel to Harlem River Drive, which had been completed only a decade prior, was demolished in 1950. The 179th Street Tunnel cost $9 million and the Highbridge Interchange cost $4.6 million. Both projects opened on May 5, 1952. At that time, the 178th Street Tunnel was reconfigured to serve eastbound traffic only, while the 179th served the westbound. The two tunnels had a similar display, with a stone arch for portals and "Whitestone" light posts.

After the end of World War II, New York public works baron Robert Moses started work on a bypass in Manhattan of the Washington Heights area to serve the George Washington Bridge. The traffic for the George Washington Bridge began to overwhelm the twin two-lane tunnels. In addition, the ventilation system was inadequate, and needed replacing. The plans for the Trans-Manhattan Expressway were conceived in 1955 and seven years later, the new expressway opened to traffic. Following the closures, the entranceway of the 178th Street Tunnel was used as a secondary emergency equipment garage for the George Washington Bridge but later removed. The two tunnels are currently being used as storage space.

Although the two tunnels were closed, there were proposals to use them again for vehicular traffic. A study was completed, in which the tunnels would be rehabilitated and reused temporarily for traffic diverted from a reconstruction of the Trans-Manhattan Expressway and the Alexander Hamilton Bridge. The rehabilitation never happened and the tunnels continue to be used as storage.
