= Interstate 95 in New York =

Highway in New York

Interstate 95
- Map of northern New York City and southern Westchester County with I-95 highlighted in red

Route information
- Maintained by NYSDOT, NYSTA and PANYNJ
- Length: 23.50 mi (37.82 km)
- Existed: August 14, 1957–present
- NHS: Entire route

Major junctions
- South end: I-95 / US 1-9 / US 46 at the New Jersey state line in Fort Lee, NJ
- US 9 / NY 9A / Henry Hudson Parkway in Washington Heights; Harlem River Drive in Washington Heights; I-87 in Morris Heights; US 1 in Tremont; Bronx River Parkway in Soundview; I-278 / I-295 / I-678 in Throggs Neck; Pelham Parkway / Shore Road in Pelham Bay Park; Hutchinson River Parkway in Pelham Bay Park and Eastchester; I-287 / US 1 in Rye
- North end: I-95 at the Connecticut state line in Port Chester

Location
- Country: United States
- State: New York
- Counties: New York, Bronx, Westchester

Highway system
- Interstate Highway System; Main; Auxiliary; Suffixed; Business; Future; New York Highways; Interstate; US; State; Reference; Parkways
← NY 94	→ NY 95

Interstate 95 (I-95) is part of the Interstate Highway System and runs from Miami, Florida, to the Canada–United States border near Houlton, Maine. In the US state of New York, I-95 extends 23.50 miles (37.82 km) from the George Washington Bridge in New York City to the Connecticut state line at Port Chester. The George Washington Bridge carries I-95 across the Hudson River from New Jersey into New York City. There, I-95 runs across Upper Manhattan on the Trans-Manhattan Expressway for 0.81 miles (1.30 km) through Washington Heights. It continues east across the Harlem River on the Alexander Hamilton Bridge and onto the Cross Bronx Expressway. In the Bronx, I-95 leaves the Cross Bronx at the Bruckner Interchange, joining the Bruckner Expressway to its end. North of the interchange with Pelham Parkway, it continues northeast via the New England Thruway (part of the New York State Thruway system) into Westchester County and to the Connecticut state line, where I-95 continues on the Connecticut Turnpike.

The Trans-Manhattan Expressway also carries US Route 1. An average of about 280,000 vehicles traverse the expressway each day. Completed in 1960, the expressway sits below ground level in an open cut; the George Washington Bridge Bus Station and the highrise Bridge Apartments are built over the expressway, creating intermittent tunnels. It is maintained by the Port Authority of New York and New Jersey (PANYNJ). Although the highway geographically runs east–west, it carries the north–south routings of I-95 and US 1. The westbound lanes carry the southbound designations of both routes, while the eastbound lanes carry the northbound designations.

== Route description ==
=== Manhattan ===
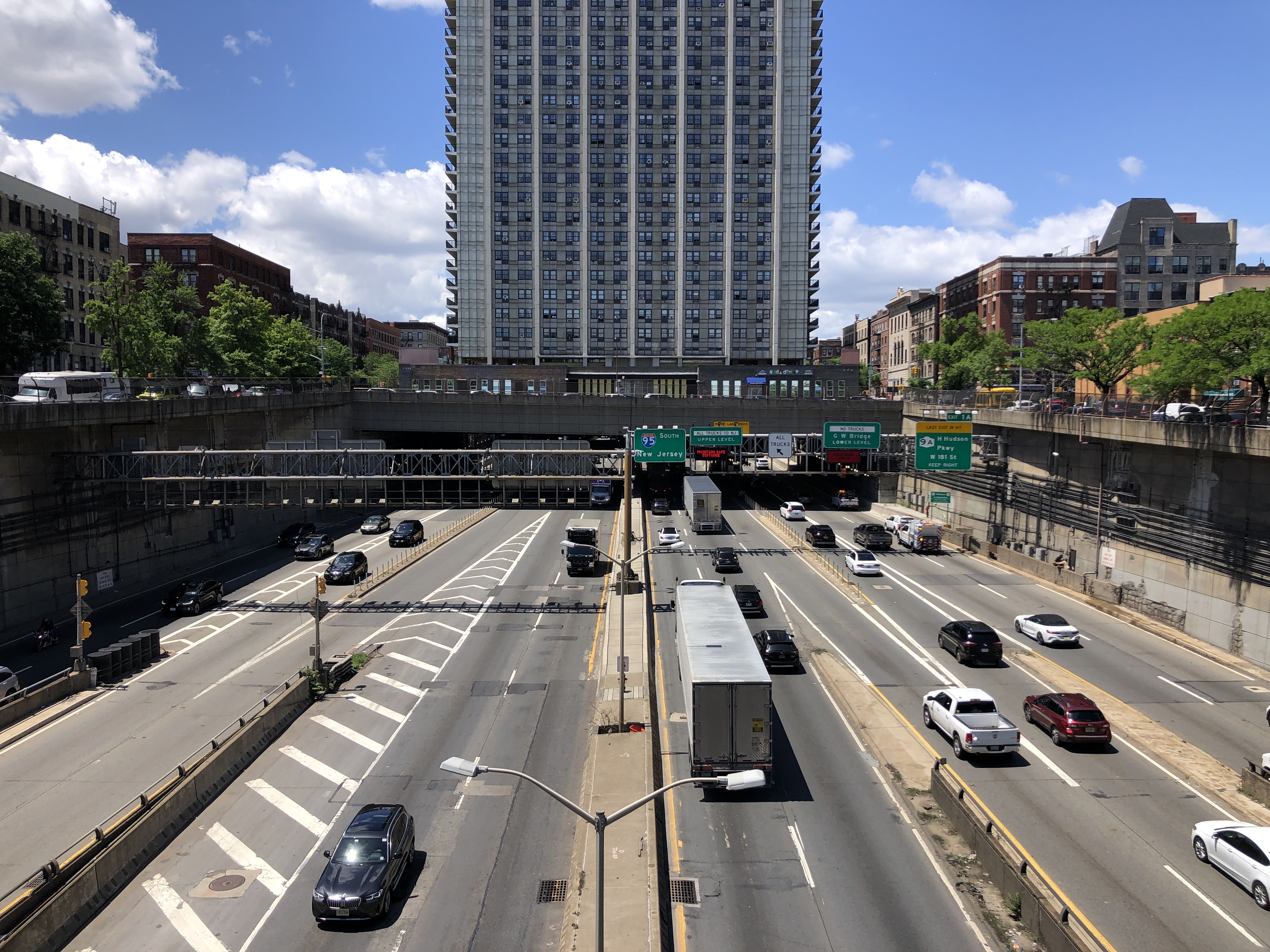
Road and apartments over the Trans-Manhattan Expressway

At its western end, the Trans-Manhattan Expressway is part of I-95, US 1, and US 9 at the eastern approach to the George Washington Bridge. It crosses Fort Washington Park, connecting with the Henry Hudson Parkway (NY 9A) at the park's eastern edge near Riverside Drive and 168th Street. It then traverses the Manhattan neighborhood of Washington Heights in a cut flanked by 178th Street to the south and 179th Street to the north. Roughly midway across Manhattan, US 9 leaves the freeway to follow Broadway northward toward the Bronx and Westchester County. Proceeding eastward, the road has several ramps that connect to the Harlem River Drive and the expressway's original Harlem River crossing, the Washington Bridge (now carrying 181st Street local traffic over the Harlem River). At Highbridge Park, the roadway crosses the Alexander Hamilton Bridge to the Bronx, where it becomes the Cross Bronx Expressway.

=== The Bronx ===
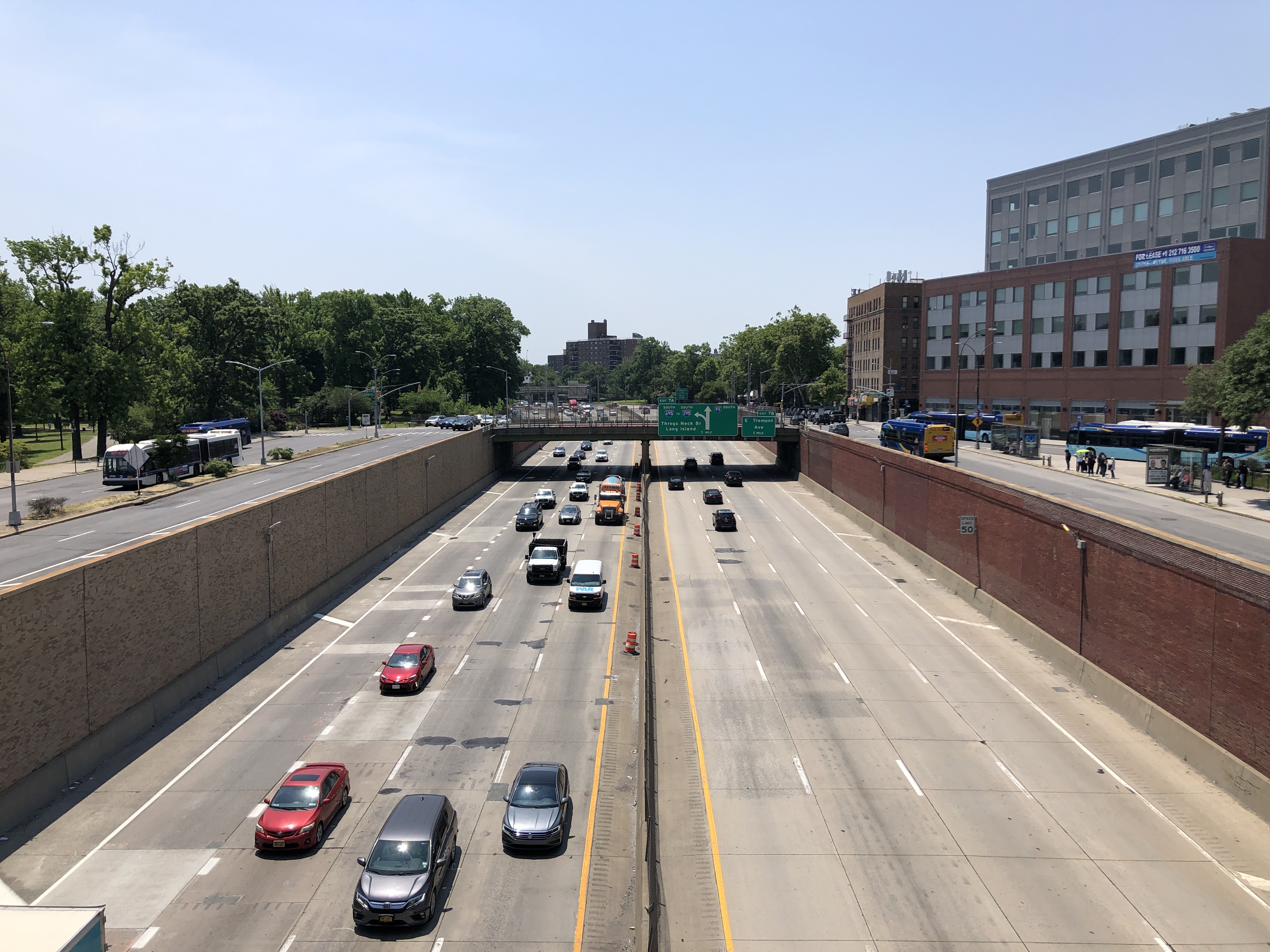
Southbound I-95 (Bruckner Expressway) at Westchester Avenue adjacent to Pelham Bay Park

After exit 2, I-95 crosses over the Harlem River and enters the Bronx, entering an interchange with the Major Deegan Expressway (I-87), which is marked both exit 1C (following with the Cross Bronx Expressway) and exit 3A–B (matching with the Trans-Manhattan Expressway). Now the Cross Bronx Expressway, I-95 and US 1 continue east under University Avenue and enter exit 2A, which serves Jerome Avenue. Crossing under the Grand Concourse, the six-lane expressway crosses into exit 2B, which is for Webster Avenue. This interchange also marks the eastern end of the I-95/US 1 concurrency. Passing south of Tremont Park, the Cross Bronx Expressway westbound serves exit 3, which serves Third Avenue.

At East 176th Street, the Cross Bronx Expressway turns southeast, entering exit 4A eastbound, which marks the northern terminus of NY 895 (Sheridan Boulevard). After crossing the Bronx River, the expressway enters a full interchange, exit 4B, with the Bronx River Parkway. After a curve from the parkway, the Cross Bronx Expressway begins paralleling East 177th Street and enters exit 5A, which connects to White Plains Road in Parkchester. Continuing southeast, the roadway enters exit 5B, Castle Hill Avenue, which is an eastbound-only exit. After Castle Hill Avenue, the route enters exit 6A, which reaches the Hutchinson River Parkway at the Bruckner Interchange. Changing to the Bruckner Expressway, which runs to the northeast, I-95 enters the Bruckner Interchange with the northern terminuses of I-678 and I-278; the Cross Bronx Expressway Extension turns southeast along I-295 at the same interchange.

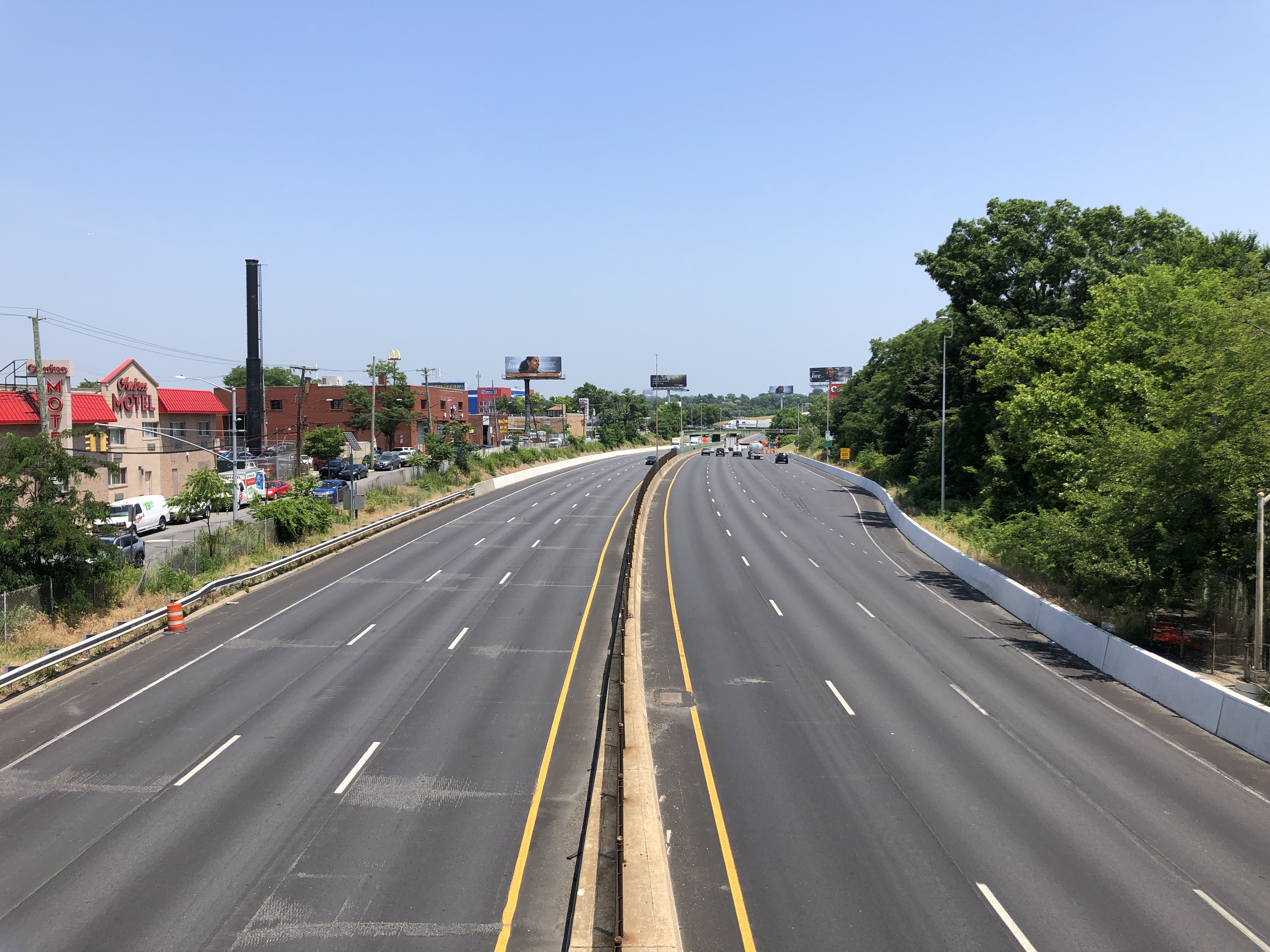
Northbound I-95 (New England Thruway) at Dyre Avenue in the Bronx

After the Bruckner Interchange, I-95 crosses Tremont Avenue before crossing over I-695 (the Throgs Neck Expressway). Southbound, exit 7A serves I-695, while northbound the two Interstates merge. Continuing north, the Bruckner Expressway and I-95 parallel Bruckner Boulevard and run along the western edge of Pelham Bay Park. Entering exit 8A southbound services Westchester Avenue while northbound, exits 8B and 8C serve Pelham Parkway and Shore Road through the park, which marks the northern end of the Bruckner Expressway. Now known as the New England Thruway, I-95 leaves Pelham Bay Park and enters exit 9, a junction with the Hutchinson River Parkway. In the middle of the interchange with the Hutchinson River, exit 10 forks to the left, reaching Gun Hill Road.

Now paralleling Baychester Avenue, which also services exit 11 and Bartow Avenue, the New England Thruway continues north and enters exit 12 which connects to Baychester Conner Street is connected via exit 13 before I-95 turns east and crosses over the Hutchinson River. After crossing the river, the route enters an interchange once again with the Hutchinson River Parkway (exit 14) but this time southbound only.

=== Westchester County ===
Shield for the New England Thruway used between 1958 and 1970.

Crossing through the northern reaches of Pelham Bay Park, I-95 turns more northeast and enters Westchester County. Now in Pelham Manor, the route runs alongside Amtrak's Hell Gate Line and crosses through Pelham Country Club, entering exit 15, which connects to US 1 (Main Street). After US 1, the route crosses out of the Pelham Country Club, entering New Rochelle.

Crossing over Metro-North Railroad tracks, the Interstate turns northeast and crossing through downtown New Rochelle, reaching exit 16, serving several local streets including Cross Avenue, Cedar Street, and Garden Street. North of exit 16, the New England Thruway enters its lone toll gantry along the alignment, serving the northbound direction only. The road continues northeast through New Rochelle, passing exit 17 as it enters the town of Mamaroneck. Exit 17 connects to Chatsworth Avenue in the Larchmont section. Passing a pedestrian footbridge for the Larchmont station, crossing over NY 125 (Weaver Street). Winding north through Mamaroneck, I-95 enters exit 18A, servicing Fenimore Road in the village of Mamaroneck.

Turning northeast again, I-95 enters exit 18B, a partial cloverleaf interchange with Mamaroneck Avenue before crossing into the town of Harrison. The road turns east, crossing over NY 127 (Harrison Avenue), and enters exit 19, the western terminus of Playland Parkway, which connects the expressway to Playland as the road enters Rye. The route crosses through the Rye Village area, entering exit 20, which connects to US 1 (Boston Post Road) and the village. Almost immediately after exit 20, exit 21 marks the eastern end of the Cross Westchester Expressway (I-287). Proceeding westbound, exit 21 and nearby exit 22 (Midland Avenue and Port Chester) are merged but are separate exits going eastbound. Crossing through the eastern edges of Port Chester, I-95 reaches the Byram River and crosses into Connecticut, becoming the Connecticut Turnpike.

== History ==
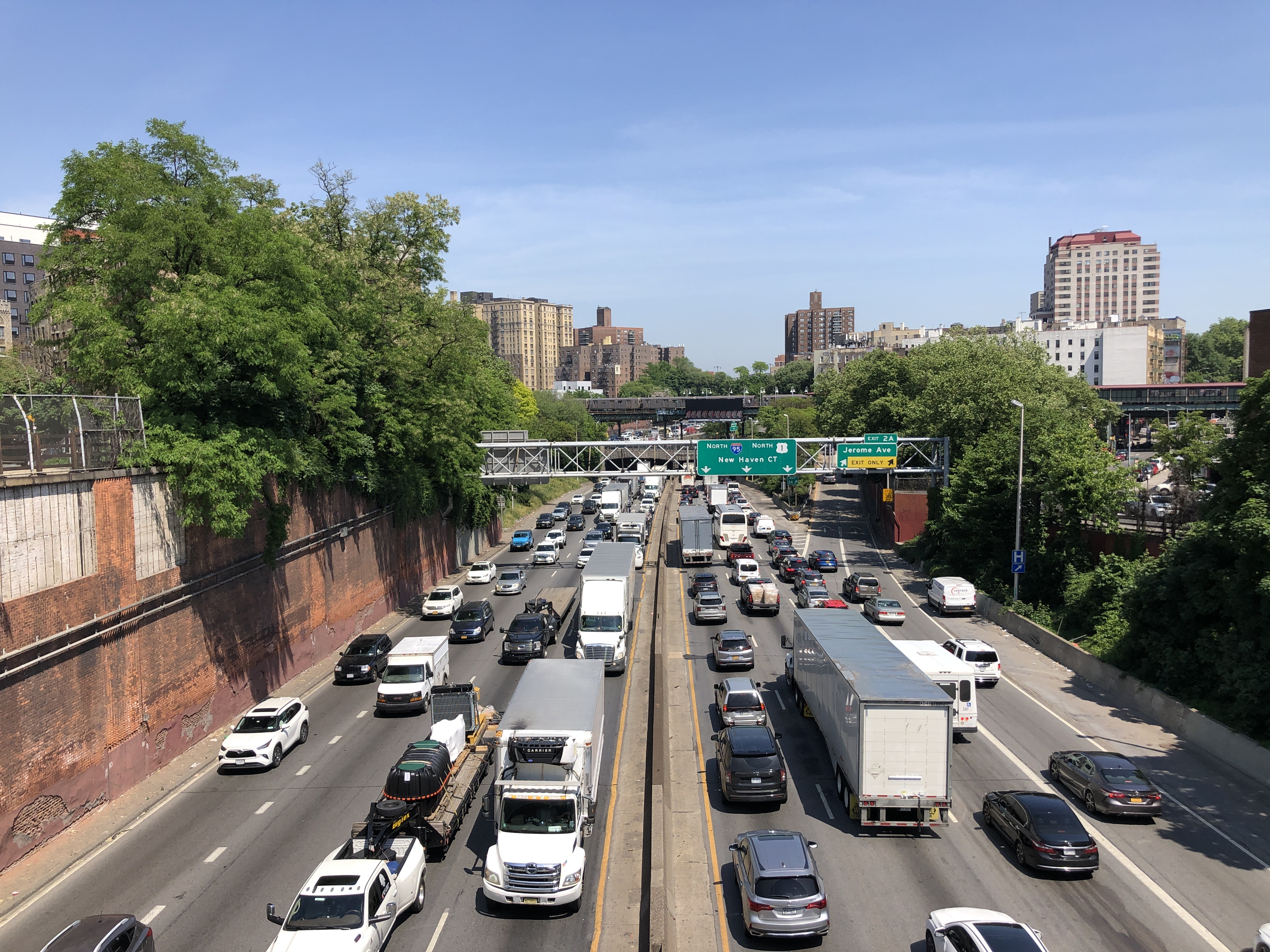
Congestion along the Cross Bronx at Exit 2A

Robert Moses first recommended the construction of what became the New England Thruway in 1940. Construction began in 1951, but major work on the highway did not commence until 1956–1957. By 1950, the New York State Thruway Authority (NYSTA) assumed control of the construction and made the New England Thruway a part of the thruway toll system. Construction lasted until 1961.

I-95 was assigned on August 14, 1957, as part of the establishment of the Interstate Highway System and has always run along its current path in New York. The route was overlaid on the under-construction New England Thruway northeast of New York City and assigned to the then-proposed Cross Bronx and Bruckner expressways through New York City. The thruway opened in October 1958, connecting the Bruckner Expressway and the Connecticut Turnpike. The final sections of the Cross Bronx and Bruckner expressways were finished in 1963 and 1972, respectively. Prior to the 1972 completion of the Bruckner Expressway, coinciding with the completion of the new Bruckner Interchange, the old Bruckner Boulevard (once part of NY 164) was used by through traffic.

=== Trans-Manhattan Expressway ===
The Trans-Manhattan Expressway replaced tunnels under 178th and 179th streets as the crosstown route.

The expressway was announced in 1957 and built in conjunction with the addition of the lower level of the George Washington Bridge. Originally known as the George Washington Bridge Expressway, the highway was originally planned as an open cut between 178th and 179th streets, traversed by overpasses carrying the major north–south avenues in Upper Manhattan. The City of New York approved the creation of the highway in June 1957 as part of a joint effort with the PANYNJ that also called for the creation of the lower deck on the George Washington Bridge and construction of the George Washington Bridge Bus Station above the cut for the expressway. The expressway, the main New York approach to the George Washington Bridge, is only 0.8 miles (1.3 km) long. The projects required demolition of numerous buildings and the relocation of 1,824 families. Overpasses over the open cut passing under Broadway, Wadsworth Avenue, and St. Nicholas Avenue were in place in December 1959.

The George Washington Bridge Expressway, with three lanes of traffic heading in each direction to and from each deck of the double-decked George Washington Bridge, opened to traffic in 1962 as part of a $60-million (equivalent to $488 million in 2025) program to improve access roads for the George Washington Bridge, whose lower deck opened that same year. The Trans-Manhattan Expressway provides access to and from the Henry Hudson Parkway and Riverside Drive on the West Side of Manhattan and to and from Tenth Avenue and the Harlem River Drive on the East Side.

The expressway was one of the first to use air rights over a major highway. After completion of the expressway, the George Washington Bridge Bus Station was built. After purchasing the air rights in 1961, Marvin Kratter built four highrise apartment buildings, known as the Bridge Apartments, over the expressway. The 32-story buildings are among the first aluminum-sheathed highrise structures built in the world. Local traffic reporters frequently refer to congestion "under the Apartments" during morning and evening rush hours.

=== Exit numbers ===
The first change to exit numbers along the New England Thruway section of I-95 was in April 1980 when the section was converted for sequential exits. Prior to the change, the Cross Bronx/Bruckner Expressway and New England Thruway sections had different exit numbering systems. More specifically, exit 19 on the Bruckner Expressway was followed immediately by exit 2 on the New England Thruway. As a result, because exit numbers on I-95 repeated themselves in close succession, the old exit numbering system frequently caused confusion.

As part of an experiment, I-95 was one of the few roads in New York to receive mileage-based exit numbers. This was implemented over both the PANYNJ section and the New York State Department of Transportation (NYSDOT) section of the highway (exits 1A–8C). The thruway section (which had originally carried its own sequential exit numbers) was then renumbered by the NYSTA to a system of sequential numbers starting from 9 (where the mileage-based system left off). This led to a situation in which exits 1 through 8 were mileage-based (all but one of which contained lettered suffixes as a result) and exits 9 through 22 were sequential.

During the late 1970s, and 1980s, in various stages, the mid-mast cuptlight-luminaire, a variant of high-mast lighting, lamps were installed onto the entire New England Thruway. These lights remain there to this day, although they've been recently replaced by LED luminaires since 2015.

Around 2005, NYSDOT began a project to renumber I-95 with sequential numbers throughout. However, the idea never fully got traction with all three agencies. The PANYNJ did complete the renumbering on its section of the road. NYSDOT itself renumbered only one section of the road in Parkchester. Meanwhile, the NYSTA did not renumber any of the exits on its stretch of the road. This led to a situation from 2005 through 2012 in which some exits were signed with two different numbers, while some numbers were repeated twice, but only on some of the signs.

Finally, in 2012, NYSDOT restored the mileage-based numbers to its portion of the highway, which once again line up with the thruway portion. This has eliminated all of the exit number conflicts, with one exception. The exception exists because the PANYNJ has not changed the numbers back on its portion of the road creating a confusing situation at the Amsterdam Avenue exit, which is maintained by NYSDOT southbound but the PANYNJ northbound. The exit is signed as exit 1B southbound (which is the proper number within the mileage-based), but as exit 2 northbound (a holdover from the failed renumbering project).

=== Incidents ===
In May 2026, two incidents of falling concrete debris occurred under the overpass for the George Washington Bridge Bus Station, causing damage to motorists' vehicles. As a result, crews made emergency repairs and installed protective netting. The PANYNJ, which operates the George Washington Bridge and its approaches, determined that excessive freezing temperatures from the past winter along with extensive use of salt to melt snow and ice "[accelerated] deterioration in aging concrete structures".

== Exit list ==
Exit numbers on the New England Thruway (north of exit 8C) are sequential, but exit numbers on the remaining section are mileage-based.

County/Borough	Location	mi	km	Old exit	New exit	Destinations	Notes
Hudson River		0.00	0.00			I-95 south / US 1-9 south (US 46 west) – New Jersey	Continuation into New Jersey at the river's center
Hudson River		0.00	0.00	George Washington Bridge (northbound toll in New Jersey)			
Manhattan	Washington Heights	0.43	0.69	1	1A	NY 9A / Henry Hudson Parkway / West 178th Street (US 9 north)	Northbound left exit and southbound entrance; northern end of US 9 concurrency; exit 14 on Henry Hudson Parkway
Manhattan	Washington Heights	0.43	0.69	1	1A	NY 9A / Henry Hudson Parkway / West 181st Street – Downtown	Southbound exit and northbound entrance; exit 14 on Henry Hudson Parkway
Manhattan	Washington Heights	1.16	1.87	2	1B	Harlem River Drive south to FDR Drive south – Manhattan	Northbound left exit and southbound entrance; exit 24 on Harlem River Drive
Manhattan	Washington Heights					I-95 south / US 1 south – George Washington Bridge Upper Level	Southern terminus of Upper Level lanes; all trucks to New Jersey
Harlem River		1.24– 1.41	2.00– 2.27	Alexander Hamilton Bridge			
The Bronx	Morris Heights	1.41	2.27	2	1B	To Amsterdam Avenue	Southbound exit and northbound entrance; access via Washington Bridge
The Bronx	Morris Heights	1.41	2.27	3	1C–D	I-87 (Major Deegan Expressway) – Albany, Queens	Signed as exits 1C (I-87 north) & 1D (I-87 south); exits 7N & 7S on I-87
The Bronx	Morris Heights	2.08	3.35	4	2A	Jerome Avenue	
The Bronx	Tremont	2.66	4.28	5	2B	US 1 north (Webster Avenue)	Northbound exit and southbound entrance; northern end of US 1 concurrency
The Bronx	Tremont	2.95	4.75	6	3	Third Avenue to US 1 north (Webster Avenue)	Southbound exit and northbound entrance
The Bronx	West Farms	3.97	6.39	7	4A	NY 895 south (Sheridan Boulevard) – RFK Bridge, Hunts Point Market	Northbound exit and southbound entrance; former I-895
The Bronx	Soundview	4.34	6.98	8	4B	Bronx River Parkway north / Rosedale Avenue	Exit 4 on Bronx River Parkway; serves Bronx Zoo
The Bronx	Parkchester	5.05	8.13	9	5A	White Plains Road / Westchester Avenue	
The Bronx	Castle Hill	5.60	9.01	10	5B	Castle Hill Avenue	Northbound exit and southbound entrance
The Bronx	Throggs Neck (Bruckner Interchange)	5.76– 6.02	9.27– 9.69	11	6A	I-678 south / Bruckner Boulevard – Whitestone Bridge, Queens	No northbound access to Bruckner Boulevard; exits 19N & 19S on I-678
The Bronx	Throggs Neck (Bruckner Interchange)	5.76– 6.02	9.27– 9.69	12	6B	I-295 south (Cross Bronx Expressway) – Throgs Neck Bridge	Northbound exit and southbound entrance; northern terminus of I-295; former I-78
The Bronx	Throggs Neck (Bruckner Interchange)	5.76– 6.02	9.27– 9.69	12	6B	I-278 west (Bruckner Expressway) – RFK Bridge, Manhattan	Southbound exit and northbound entrance; eastern terminus of I-278
The Bronx	Throggs Neck (Bruckner Interchange)	5.76– 6.02	9.27– 9.69	Transition between Cross Bronx and Bruckner Expressways			
The Bronx	Schuylerville	7.40– 7.70	11.91– 12.39	13	7A	I-695 south to I-295 south – Throgs Neck Bridge, Long Island	Southbound exit and northbound entrance; northern terminus of I-695
The Bronx	Schuylerville	7.40– 7.70	11.91– 12.39	14	7B	East Tremont Avenue	Southbound exit only
The Bronx	Country Club	7.40– 7.70	11.91– 12.39	15	7C	Country Club Road – Pelham Bay Park	Northbound exit and entrance
The Bronx	Country Club	8.40	13.52	16	8A	Westchester Avenue	Southbound exit and entrance
The Bronx	Pelham Bay Park	8.66	13.94	17–18	8B–C	Pelham Parkway west – Orchard Beach, City Island	Signed as exits 8B (Orchard Beach) and 8C (Pelham Parkway) southbound; access to Orchard Beach via Shore Road; former NY 1B
The Bronx	Pelham Bay Park	8.66	13.94	Transition between Bruckner Expressway and New England Thruway			
The Bronx	Pelham Bay Park	8.99	14.47	19 1	9	Hutchinson River Parkway north – Westchester County / Palmer Avenue / Erskine Place	Exits 2A-B on Hutchinson Parkway; No northbound access to Erskine Place; no southbound access to Palmer Avenue; no general access to Hutchinson River Parkway south;
The Bronx	Baychester	8.99	14.47	2	10	Gun Hill Road	Northbound exit and southbound entrance
The Bronx	Baychester	9.56– 9.71	15.39– 15.63	3	11	Bartow Avenue / Co-op City Boulevard	
The Bronx	Baychester	9.56– 9.71	15.39– 15.63	4	12	Baychester Avenue	Northbound exit and southbound entrance
The Bronx	Eastchester	10.82	17.41	5	13	Conner Street / Baychester Avenue	Baychester Avenue not signed northbound
The Bronx	Pelham Bay Park	11.41	18.36	6	14	Hutchinson River Parkway south – Whitestone Bridge	Southbound exit and northbound entrance; exit 4A on Hutchinson River Parkway; former NY 1A
Westchester	New Rochelle	13.04	20.99	7	15	US 1 (Boston Post Road) – New Rochelle, The Pelhams	
Westchester	New Rochelle	14.20	22.85	8	16	North Avenue / Cedar Street – New Rochelle	Serves New Rochelle station; last northbound exit before toll
Westchester	New Rochelle	15.60	25.11	9	17	Chatsworth Avenue – Larchmont	Northbound exit (tolled) and southbound entrance; serves Larchmont station
Westchester	New Rochelle	15.60	25.11	New Rochelle Toll Gantry (northbound only)			
Westchester	Village of Mamaroneck	17.57	28.28	10A	18A	Fenimore Road – Mamaroneck	Northbound exit only
Westchester	Village of Mamaroneck	18.46	29.71	10	18A–B	Mamaroneck Avenue – Mamaroneck, White Plains	Signed as exits 18A (east Mamaroneck Avenue) and 18B (west Mamaroneck Avenue); no northbound access to Mamaroneck Avenue east; serves Mamaroneck station
Westchester	City of Rye	20.91	33.65	11	19	Playland Parkway east – Rye, Harrison	Western terminus of Playland Parkway
Westchester	City of Rye	22.14	35.63	12	20	US 1 south – Rye	Northbound exit and southbound entrance
Westchester	City of Rye	22.54– 22.68	36.27– 36.50	13	21	I-287 west (Cross Westchester Expressway) / US 1 north / Midland Avenue – White Plains, Tappan Zee Bridge, Port Chester, Rye	Signed as exits 21 (I-287 west) and 22 (Midland Avenue) northbound; no southbound access to US 1; eastern terminus and exit 12 on I-287
Byram River		23.44	37.72	Byram River Bridge			
Byram River		23.44	37.72			I-95 north (Connecticut Turnpike) – New Haven	Continuation into Connecticut
1.000 mi = 1.609 km; 1.000 km = 0.621 mi: Concurrency terminus; Electronic toll collection; Incomplete access; Route transition

=== G.W. Bridge Upper Level lanes ===
The entire route is in the New York City borough of Manhattan.

Location	mi	km	Old exit	New exit	Destinations	Notes
Hudson River	0.00	0.00			I-95 south / US 1-9 south (US 46 west) – New Jersey	Continuation into New Jersey at the river's center
Hudson River	0.00	0.00	George Washington Bridge (northbound toll in New Jersey)			
Washington Heights	0.43	0.69	1	1A	NY 9A / Henry Hudson Parkway / West 178th Street (US 9 north)	Northbound exit and southbound entrance; northern end of US 9 concurrency; exit 14 on Henry Hudson Parkway
Washington Heights	1.16	1.87	2	2	Harlem River Drive south to FDR Drive south – Manhattan	Northbound exit and southbound entrance; exit 24 on Harlem River Drive
Washington Heights	1.2	1.9			I-95 north / US 1 north (Alexander Hamilton Bridge)	Northern terminus of Upper Level lanes
1.000 mi = 1.609 km; 1.000 km = 0.621 mi: Concurrency terminus; Electronic toll collection; Incomplete access

== Auxiliary routes ==
=== Current ===
- I-295 runs southeast from the Bruckner Interchange along the Cross Bronx Expressway, then south over the Throgs Neck Bridge and Clearview Expressway to its terminus at Hillside Avenue, just south of the Grand Central Parkway. It was once signed as part of I-78 and was planned to terminate at John F. Kennedy International Airport.
- I-495 runs from the Queens–Midtown Tunnel east along the Long Island Expressway to Riverhead, crossing I-295 in Queens. It was once planned to continue west to I-95 in New Jersey; that part is now Lincoln Tunnel and Route 495. It was also to go east and meet I-95 again in either Connecticut or in Rhode Island. This would have made I-495 a bypass road for I-95.
- I-695 is a short route along the Throgs Neck Expressway, connecting I-295 to I-95 in the Bronx. It was once signed as part of I-78. The number had been used for other plans, including a route parallel to Woodhaven Boulevard and an upgrade of the West Side Highway and the Henry Hudson Parkway.

=== Former ===
- I-895, also known as the Sheridan Expressway, was a short connection from I-278 to I-95 in the Bronx. It was planned to continue north from I-95 to rejoin it near Pelham Bay Park, making it another bypass road. I-895 was downgraded to NY 895 in 2017 and was converted to a boulevard between 2018 and 2019.

== See also ==
Interstate 95
Previous state: New Jersey	New York	Next state: Connecticut
