= Cross Bronx Expressway =

Highway in New York City

- Map of the Bronx in New York City with Cross Bronx Expressway highlighted in red

Route information
- Length: 6.83 mi (10.99 km)
- Existed: 1955–present
- Component highways: I-95 from Morris Heights to Throggs Neck; I-295 in Throggs Neck

Major junctions
- West end: I-87 / I-95 / US 1 in Morris Heights
- US 1 in Tremont; Bronx River Parkway in Soundview; I-95 / I-278 / I-678 in Throggs Neck
- East end: I-295 Toll in Throggs Neck

Location
- Country: United States
- State: New York

Highway system
- New York Highways; Interstate; US; State; Reference; Parkways

The Cross Bronx Expressway is a major freeway in the New York City borough of the Bronx. It is mainly designated as part of Interstate 95 (I-95), but also includes portions of I-295 and U.S. Route 1 (US 1). The Cross Bronx begins at the eastern approach to the Alexander Hamilton Bridge over the Harlem River. While I-95 leaves at the Bruckner Interchange in Throgs Neck, following the Bruckner Expressway and New England Thruway to Connecticut, the Cross Bronx Expressway continues east, carrying I-295 to the merge with the Throgs Neck Expressway near the Throgs Neck Bridge. Though the road goes primarily northwest-to-southeast, the nominal directions of all route numbers west of the Bruckner Interchange are aligned with the northbound route number going southeast, and the southbound route number going northwest.

The Cross Bronx Expressway was conceived by Robert Moses and built between 1948 and 1972. It was the first highway built through a crowded urban environment in the United States; the most expensive mile of road ever built to that point is part of the Cross Bronx, costing $40 million (equivalent to $481 million in 2025). At one point during construction, Moses' crews had to support the Grand Concourse (a major surface thoroughfare), a subway line (Note: The IND Concourse Line) and several elevated train lines (Note: The IRT Pelham Line at Westchester Avenue; the IRT White Plains Road Line at Boston Road; the IRT Third Avenue Line at Third Avenue; and the IRT Jerome Avenue Line at Jerome Avenue) while the expressway was laboriously pushed through. The highway experiences severe traffic problems, and its construction has been blamed for negatively affecting a number of low-income neighborhoods in the South Bronx. Most Bronxites consider the Cross Bronx Expressway the defining border between the North and the South Bronx.

== Route description ==
A time-lapse video of a westbound trip on the Cross Bronx Expressway and adjacent highways

The Cross Bronx Expressway begins at the eastern end of the Alexander Hamilton Bridge, officially designated as both I-95 and US 1. Immediately after coming off the bridge, there is an interchange with the Major Deegan Expressway (I-87) for Yankee Stadium and points upstate. The highway soon intersects with Webster Avenue at a partial interchange allowing eastbound vehicles to exit and westbound ones to enter. Northbound US 1 leaves the Cross Bronx Expressway at this exit. About 1.5 miles (2.4 km) later, the expressway has a pair of closely spaced interchanges for NY 895 (Sheridan Boulevard) and the Bronx River Parkway. The exit for Sheridan Boulevard is an incomplete interchange and allows access from northbound and to southbound I-95 only.

The Cross Bronx Expressway reaches the Bruckner Interchange 2 miles (3.2 km) later. The service road is called East 177th Street between the Bronx River Parkway and the Bruckner Interchange. Going eastbound (I-95 northbound), the interchange allows access to southbound I-678, northbound I-95 (Bruckner Expressway) and southbound I-295. I-95 leaves the Cross Bronx Expressway here and continues north along the Bruckner Expressway. The Cross Bronx Expressway continues east of the interchange as I-295, which begins here. The Cross Bronx connects with the Throgs Neck Expressway, where traffic from I-695 merges on before the expressway ends at the northern approach to the Throgs Neck Bridge.

== History ==
=== Planning ===
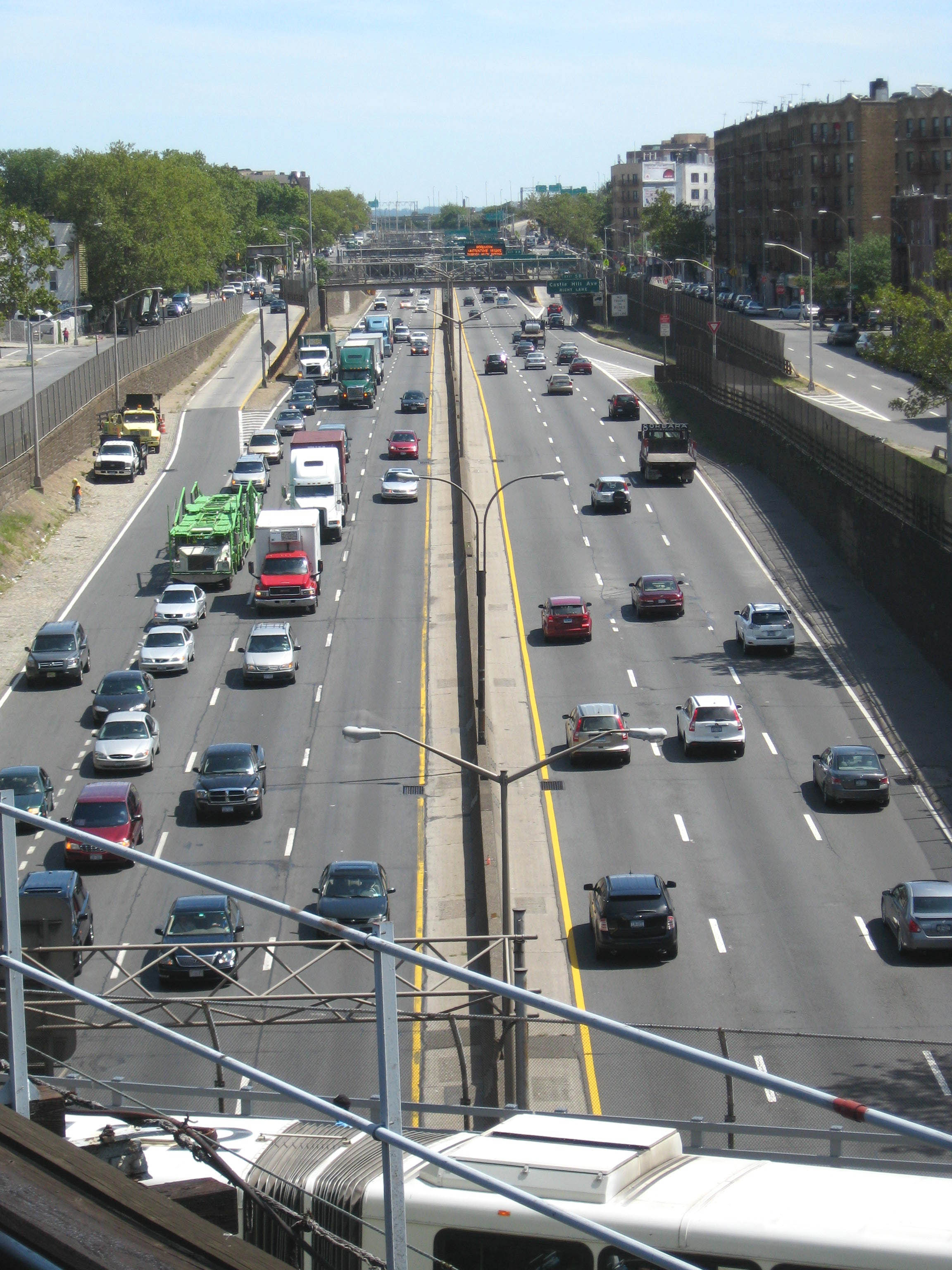
Eastward from Westchester Avenue

The 1929 Report on Highway Traffic Conditions and Proposed Traffic Relief Measures for the City of New York was the first citywide traffic study, classifying a number of projects that had been proposed by local interests. A "Cross-Bronx Route" along 161st and 163rd Streets was one of two proposed facilities, along with the "Nassau Boulevard" (which became the Long Island Expressway), picked by borough engineers as examples of important projects. Although this routing was south of the present Cross Bronx Expressway, the report did suggest a "New Cross-Bronx Artery" near the present expressway that would link the Washington Bridge with the Clason Point Ferry to Queens. Though it would not be built to freeway standards, it would be 60 feet (18 m) wide with grade separations "where considered necessary and desirable." The George Washington Bridge, then under construction, was cited among reasons to build the highway which would help connect New Jersey to Long Island via the bridges and ferry.

In 1936, the Regional Plan Association (RPA) proposed a highway that would connect the Bronx to New England and points north. In late 1940, the New York City Planning Commission adopted a plan for a network of highways. Except for the Bronx and Pelham Parkway, which lay to the north, no cross-Bronx highway had been built up to this point. The report stated that the "Bronx Crosstown Highway", which would now connect on the east end to the Bronx–Whitestone Bridge (which had replaced the Clason Point Ferry), was "an essential part of a desirable highway pattern", taking traffic from the George Washington Bridge to Long Island and New England. The cost was estimated at $17 million, higher than most improvements because of the "topographical conditions, high land values, and heavily built-up areas".

=== Construction ===
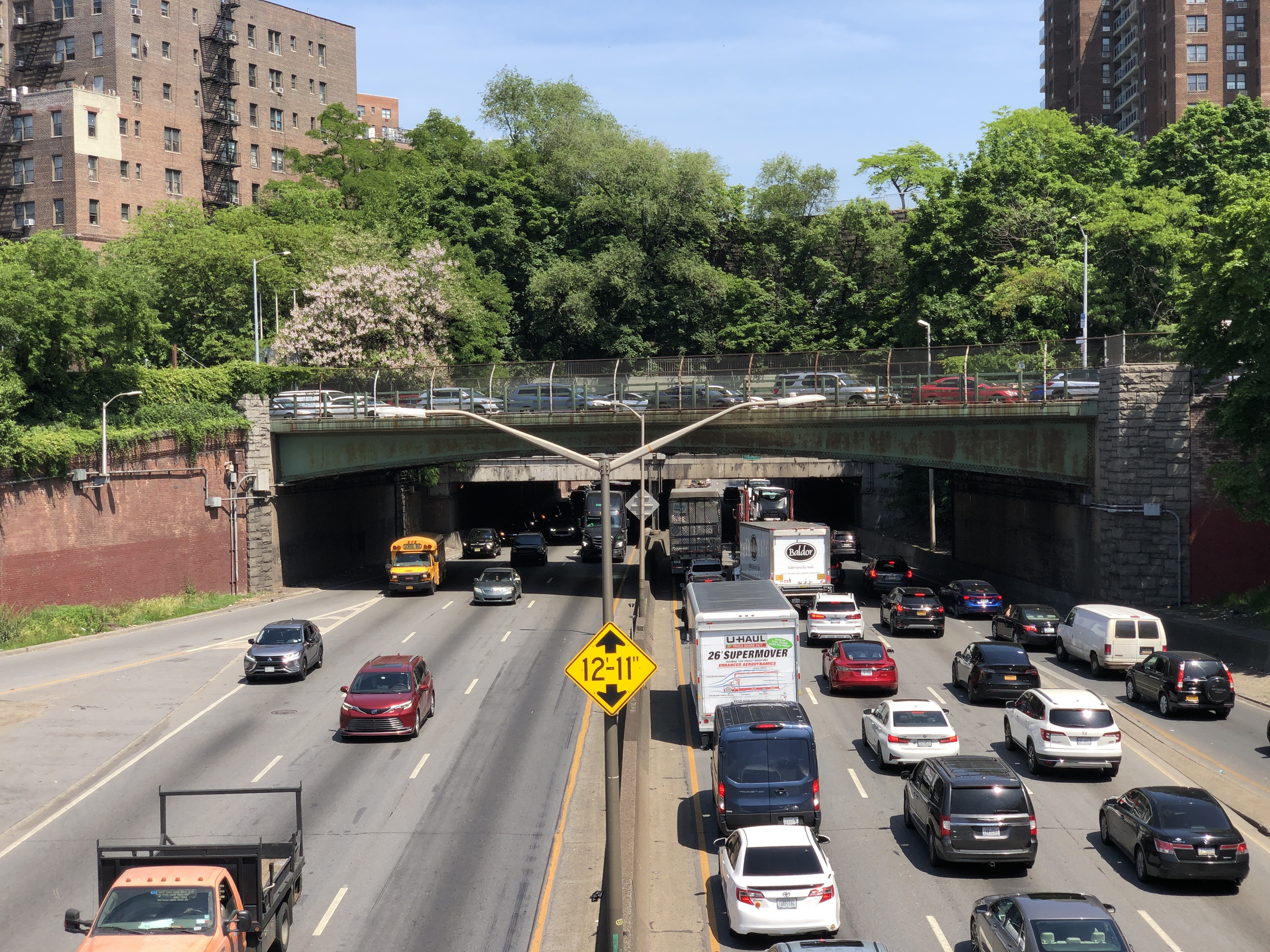
The Expressway traverses beneath Walton Avenue and Grand Concourse.

In the 1940s, city planner Robert Moses proposed the construction of a system of highways that would traverse the New York City area. The plan was to cost $800 million (equivalent to $14 billion in 2024), and, in February 1945, the city agreed to pay $60 million (equivalent to $826 million in 2024) of that cost. That November, the city, state, and federal governments agreed to fund several new highways in New York City. Among these was the Cross Bronx Expressway, which was to cost $38.67 million. The expressway was to continue onto the 181st Street Bridge at its western end, connecting with the 178th–179th Street Tunnels and the George Washington Bridge via a set of ramps. At its eastern end, the expressway would connect with the Hutchinson River Parkway and New England Thruway at the Bruckner Interchange.

The New York City Board of Estimate approved a contract in February 1946, allowing the Tenant Relocation Bureau to relocate 540 families who lived on the expressway's right-of-way. The New York City Council adopted a resolution the next month, asking the Board of Estimate to delay the relocations, which were scheduled to start that June. City officials said that only 55 families would be relocated in 1946 and that all existing residents would be relocated before construction started. By late 1947, the city and state governments were relocating residents in the expressway's path. The city and state started soliciting bids for construction contracts that December. Although the city and state planned to demolish 164 structures on the expressway's right-of-way, they were reluctant to raze all of the structures immediately because of a housing shortage in New York City. The city government was able to obtain this land through the eminent domain process.

Construction of the expressway began in 1948. A 112-foot open cut was excavated, accommodating six 12-foot-wide (3.7 m) traffic lanes and four 10-foot-wide (3.0 m) cobblestone shoulders. This project proved to be one of the most difficult expressway projects at the time; construction required blasting through ridges, crossing valleys and redirecting small rivers. In doing so, minimal disruption to the apartment buildings that topped the ridges in the area of Grand Concourse was a priority. Moreover, the expressway had to cross 113 streets, seven expressways and parkways (some of which were under construction), as well as numerous subway and train lines. The highway also passed by hundreds of utility, water and sewer lines, none of which could be interrupted. The highway was to contain 54 bridges and three tunnels when it was completed. By early 1949, the project's budget had increased to $53 million, in part because of material shortages.

==== Eastern section ====
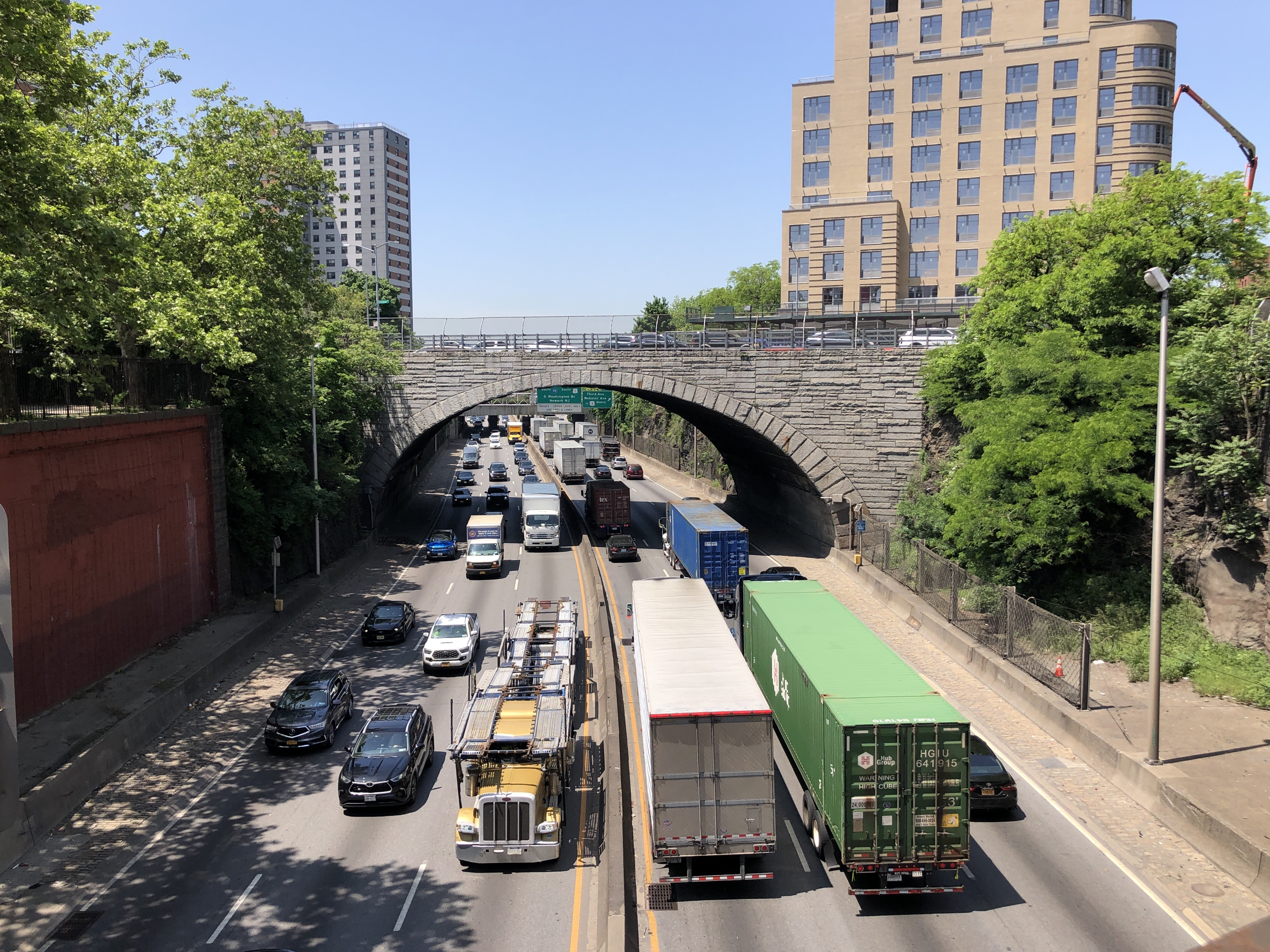
A large stone arch overpass carries Crotona Avenue over the expressway

By early 1949, the first section of the expressway, between Olmstead Avenue and Westchester Creek, was not planned to be completed until 1951. The Gull Construction Company was contracted to build this segment in May 1949, and Rusciano & Sons was hired the same month to build the footings for six bridges along the expressway. In addition, Frederick H. Zurmuhlen was supervising the construction of a bridge over Westchester Creek at a cost of $5,287,000; the ten-lane bridge was to supplement a surface-level span. Engineering firms Andrews & Clark and Hardesty & Hanover were hired to supervise the project later in 1949. A short segment near Bruckner Boulevard opened in 1950 and was the first part of the expressway to be completed.

The state government hired the J. Kaufman Demolition Company in 1951 to raze structures on the right-of-way east of the Bronx River Parkway. By early 1953, part of the highway east of the Bronx River Parkway was also being constructed. The construction of this section required excavating underneath the Parkchester station of the New York City Subway's Pelham Line. In addition, the Bronx River had to be relocated several hundred feet in the vicinity of the Bronx River Parkway interchange. The section from the Bronx River Parkway to the Bruckner Interchange opened on November 5, 1955, at the same time as parts of the Queens Midtown and Major Deegan expressways. The first portion of the Cross Bronx Expressway had cost $34.6 million and was about 2 miles (3.2 km) long. The segment was six lanes wide; its original western end was at Rosedale Avenue, where ramps connected to the northbound Bronx River Parkway. A one-mile (1.5 km) western extension from the Bronx River Parkway to a temporary interchange at Longfellow Avenue, near Boston Road, opened on April 23, 1956.

When the Throgs Neck Bridge to Queens opened on January 11, 1961, the Cross Bronx was extended east as one of the bridge's two northern approaches. The other approach—the Throgs Neck Expressway (I-695), which opened later on—also became part of the Interstate Highway System. The Cross Bronx Expressway Extension and the Clearview Expressway were originally designated as part of I-78, which was to continue through Queens, Brooklyn, and Manhattan to the Holland Tunnel. Ultimately, most of I-78 was canceled in 1971. In anticipation of this change, the Cross Bronx Expressway Extension and the Clearview Expressway were renumbered I-295 on January 1, 1970.

==== Central section ====
The section of the Cross Bronx Expressway between Anthony and Longfellow Avenues was highly controversial. In early 1953, Bronx borough president James J. Lyons proposed relocating the Cross Bronx Expressway near Crotona Park in order to preserve 1,000 houses in the expressway's right-of-way. Under Lyons's plan, the highway would curve slightly southward and run along the northern edge of Crotona Park, creating a "kink" in the routing. Moses, who called Lyons's proposal "unreasonable", threatened to resign from his position as city construction coordinator if Lyons's alternative was approved. Moses also threatened to cancel federal funding for the entire project. After an acrimonious public hearing in April 1953, the Board of Estimate could not agree on whether to relocate the expressway along Crotona Park. State officials supported Moses's original plan, saying that the Crotona Park alternative would create "curves and reverse curves of sub-standard radius". Ultimately, the Board of Estimate approved Moses's original alignment that May.

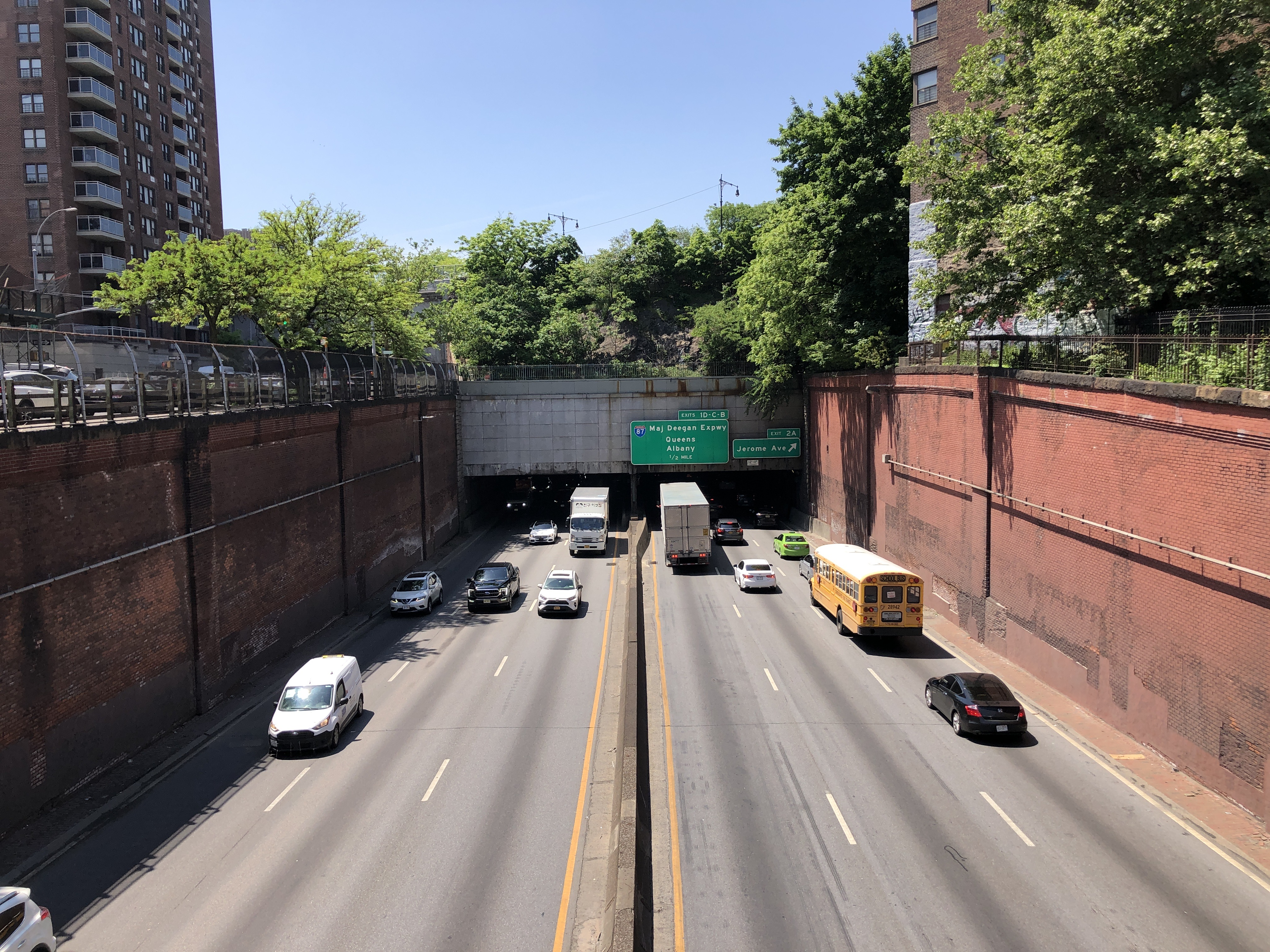
The westbound Cross Bronx Expressway passing under Grand Concourse; note the large brick-faced retaining walls

By 1954, the project's cost had increased to $86 million, but land for the western section of the expressway had not even been purchased, leading The New York Times to describe the existing sections as a "road to nowhere". Although the Cross Bronx Expressway had been one of the first highways planned in New York City, it was estimated that the expressway would be the last project to be completed. In November 1954, the Board of Estimate voted unanimously to buy land for the section between Anthony and Longfellow Avenues, despite continued opposition from Bronx residents. At the time, officials estimated that the central section of the expressway would cost $21 million. Of this cost, $8 million would be spent on acquiring the land and relocating 1,462 families. By 1956, the Times reported that the center section was not expected to be completed for several years because of the expense of relocating tenants.

Construction of the section between exits 3 and 2B began in early 1958, at which point the project's total cost had increased to $101 million. The most expensive part of the project was the 0.6-mile (0.97 km) segment between exits 2B and 2A in Tremont, Bronx, which was planned to cost $11.788 million; it included a 300-foot-long (91 m) tunnel under the Grand Concourse and the underground Concourse Line, as well as an open cut that passed under five avenues. On April 27, 1960, another 1.2-mile (2 km) piece opened, taking the road west to a temporary terminus at Webster Avenue. Later that year, the westernmost 0.4 miles (0.64 km) of the expressway was closed to allow the completion of the Tremont section. The 0.6-mile (1 km) Tremont segment from Webster Avenue west to Jerome Avenue opened on February 10, 1961. By that time, all construction contracts for the remaining sections of the expressway had been awarded.

==== Western section ====
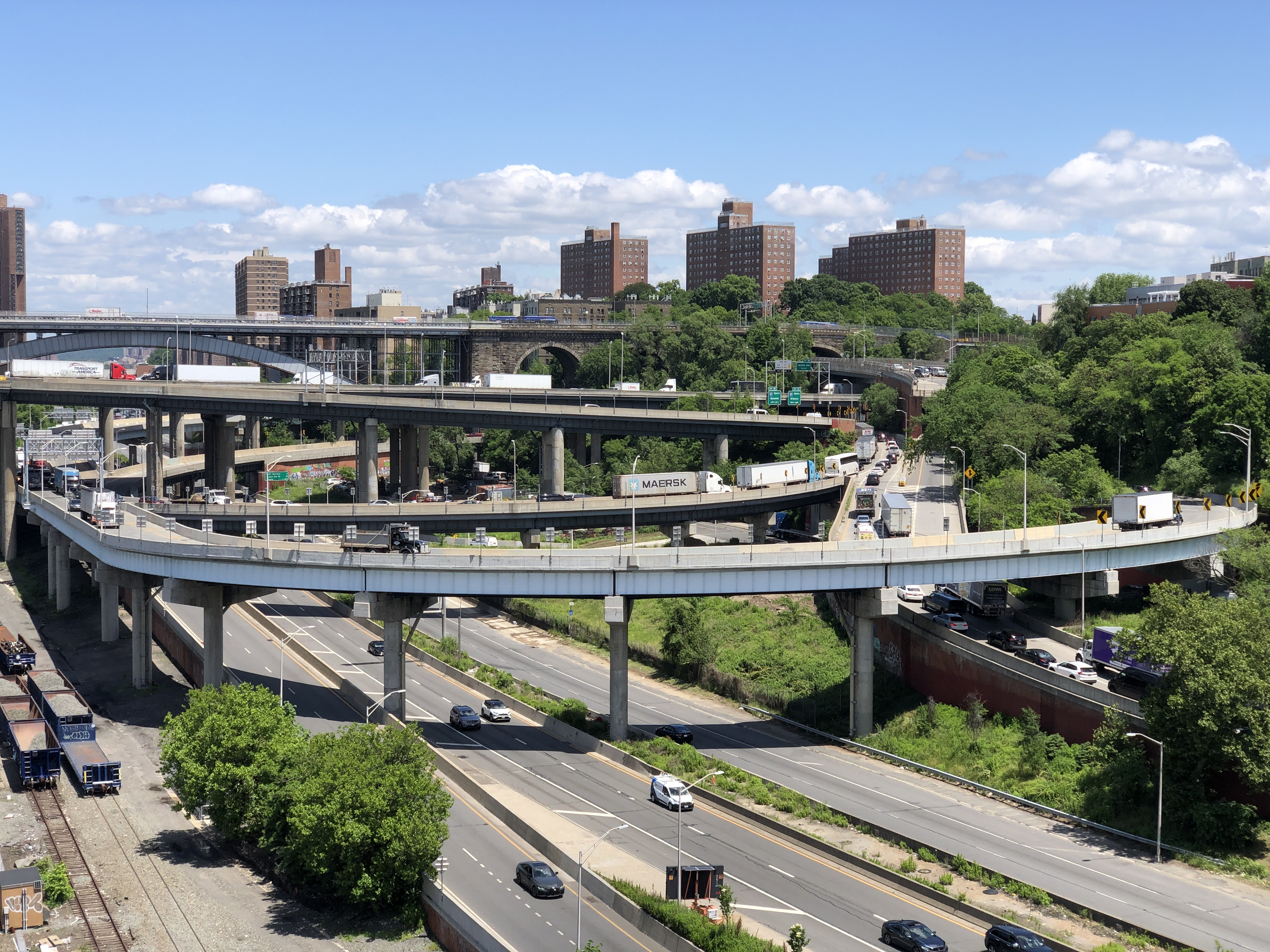
Deegan interchange

The 181st Street Bridge, and the ramps from the bridge to the existing 178th Street Tunnel and a new 179th Street Tunnel in Manhattan, were originally part of the Cross Bronx Expressway. In 1949, workers began widening the 181st Street Bridge, constructing the ramps, and excavating the 179th Street Tunnel. The widening was finished by 1950, and the tunnel and interchange opened on May 5, 1952. Originally, there had not been any plans to construct an interchange with the Major Deegan Expressway, at the highway's western end, because of the area's steep topography and limited space. In December 1952, the city and state reached an agreement to finance the construction of an interchange at that site.

Plans for the western end of the expressway were modified substantially after the Port Authority of New York and New Jersey announced in 1957 that it would construct a lower deck on the George Washington Bridge. To accommodate the additional traffic from the George Washington Bridge, the Trans-Manhattan Expressway and Alexander Hamilton Bridge were to be constructed, connecting the George Washington Bridge and the Cross Bronx Expressway. The revised plans were announced in 1958. At the time, the Alexander Hamilton Bridge was planned to be completed in 1962, but the interchange with the Major Deegan would not open until two years after that. With the opening of the Alexander Hamilton Bridge in 1963, the Cross Bronx Expressway's final segment was completed. The project had cost $128 million.

=== Post-completion ===
==== 1960s to 1990s ====
When the highway was finished, road signs variously displayed its name and its numeric designation, I-95, creating confusion for motorists; local residents were more familiar with the name, while non-locals typically used the numeric designation. The state government also surveyed 30 overpasses across the highway in response to complaints that the overpasses' short railings posed a hazard to pedestrians. Additionally, two major interchanges were still incomplete when the expressway's final segment opened: the Highbridge Interchange with the Major Deegan Expressway (I-87), and the Bruckner Interchange with the Bruckner Expressway (I-95/I-278), the Hutchinson River Parkway, and the Hutchinson River Expressway (I-678). The $12.6 million Highbridge Interchange opened in November 1964.

The reconstruction of the Bruckner Interchange, The rebuilt interchange, allowing Bruckner Expressway traffic to bypass the old traffic circle, opened on January 2, 1972, at a cost of $68 million. Cross Bronx traffic passing through to the Throgs Neck Bridge had been able to avoid the circle, but drivers taking the Bruckner in either direction, including those bound for New England, had to exit onto the surface.

==== 2000s to present ====
The New York State Department of Transportation (NYSDOT) conducted a study in the early 2000s to address some of the negative community impacts (see § Effects) that the expressway's construction had caused. The study proposed several alternatives, including widening the highway near the Alexander Hamilton Bridge, or building a park or pedestrian and bicycle paths above the highway.

In late 2023, the U.S. government allocated $150 million for bus lanes, sidewalks, and bicycle lanes on parts of the Cross Bronx Expressway. This was part of a $258 million project to replace five bridges along the expressway. The following June, the New York state and city governments began hosting meetings with local residents to determine how to reconnect neighborhoods that had been split during the expressway's construction. The state government planned to finalize the designs for the five new bridges by late 2024; at the time, the project was scheduled to take four years. Several environmental groups objected to the bridge replacement, saying that the state government had not solicited enough feedback from local residents. Local residents also expressed concerns that the project would require the temporary closure of part of Starlight Park. Other opposition arose from the width of the new bridges, which would be greater than the previous bridges. By 2025, the Cross Bronx Expressway repairs had received about $900 million in funding, and the NYSDOT was considering ways to mitigate impacts from the project. The bridge-replacement project was suspended in May 2026 due to opposition to the expansion.

== Effects ==
=== Urban decay ===
The Cross Bronx Expressway is blamed for worsening the decay of neighborhoods in the South Bronx and required relocating as many as 60,000 residents. The writer Robert Caro, in his book The Power Broker, argues that Moses intentionally directed the expressway through this neighborhood, even though there was a more viable option only one block south. The expressway's construction displaced many residents, who generally were not relocated to adequate housing. An estimated 1,500 residents were displaced for the Cross Bronx Expressway. The New York Times reported in 2022 that the areas near the Cross Bronx Expressway were among New York City's poorest neighborhoods; these areas contained 220,000 residents, most of which were ethnic minorities.

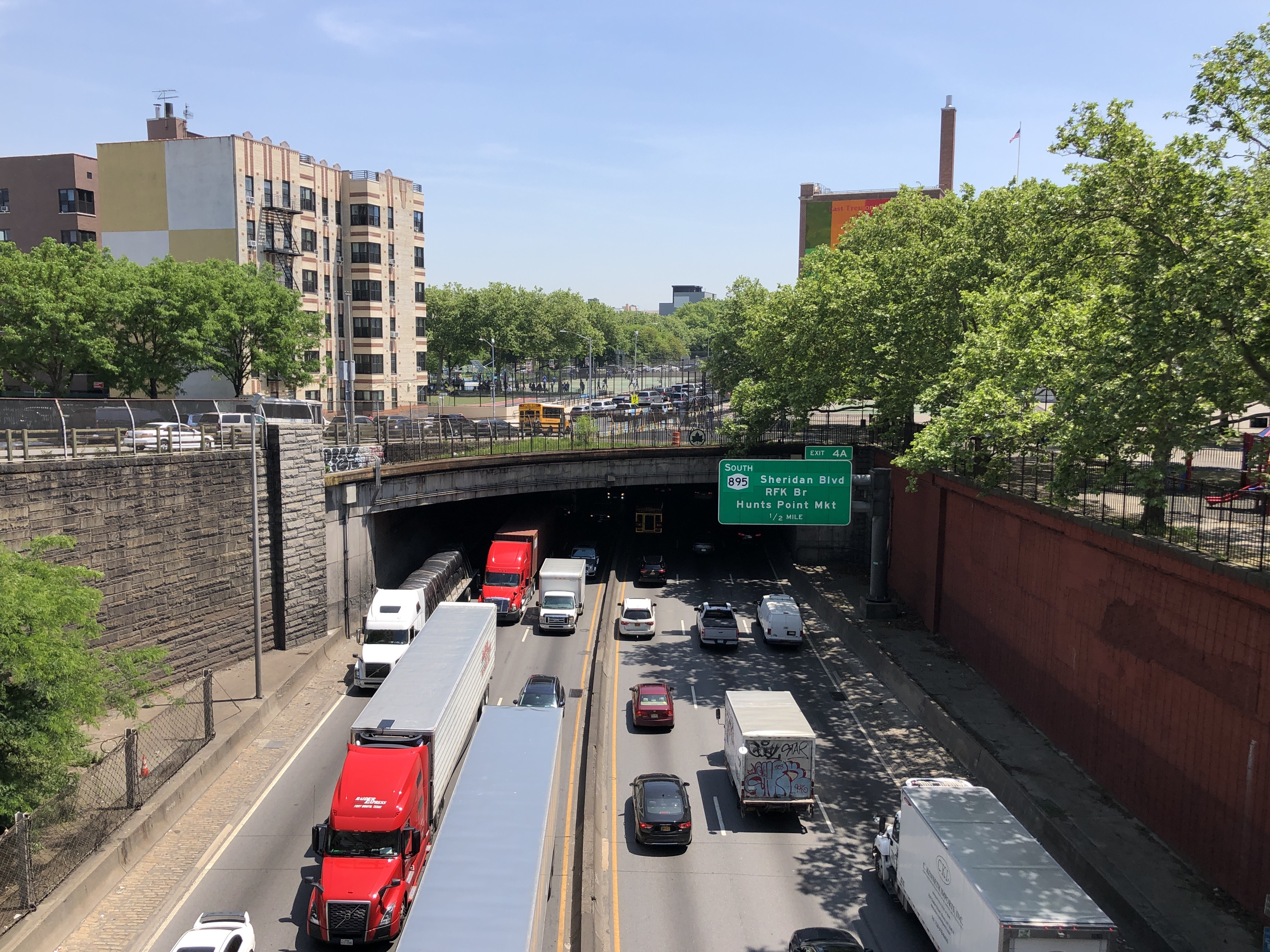
The eastbound Cross Bronx entering the tunnel in East Tremont, one of the most impoverished parts of New York City

Many of the neighborhoods it runs through have been continually poor since its construction, partly due to the lowered property value caused by the expressway. This is partially responsible for the public opposition to many other planned expressways in New York City that were later cancelled – in particular, the Lower Manhattan Expressway, and may have provided impetus to Jane Jacobs, an American expatriate, in her opposition to the Scarborough Expressway in Toronto. Architect Ronald Shiffman argues that the Cross Bronx Expressway "ripped through the heart of the Bronx, creating what was a wall between what eventually was known as the Northern and Southern part of the Bronx." Ginia Bellafante of The New York Times said in 2025 that the highway was "perhaps the most egregious hallmark of destructive city planning in the country" and that structural deterioration over the years had exacerbated the impact on neighboring communities.

=== Public housing projects ===
Because of the influx of people moving into the Bronx, especially due to immigrants after WW2, a housing crisis began. The Urban Under Title 1 of the 1949 Housing Act, the Slum Clearance Committee, headed by Robert Moses, was able to take advantage of places labeled slums by government agencies like the HOCL and completely destroy them without contest. The destruction of neighborhoods that the Cross Bronx Expressway would go through was highly intentional, as Moses used his chairman position to get his way despite protests of residents. These neighborhoods were supposed to be replaced by better quality public housing, but the better quality aspect was not properly enforced by the government. Nearby neighborhoods that were not directly destroyed had to deal with the debris and garbage from the Cross Bronx Expressway construction. Moses created more slums under the guise of eradicating them.

Middle class families left the Bronx due to the construction of the Cross Bronx Expressway, leaving behind their single family residences which were also replaced by public housing projects. Robert Moses, while working on the Cross Bronx Expressway, created highly dense apartment buildings. These housing projects were originally intended to temporarily house relocated families, but as unemployment rates increased, people could not afford to leave as most of the people evicted were the poorest people living in New York. The evicted people were mostly ethnic minorities. The public housing for the relocated families was low quality in order to not compete with landlords. The projects were densely populated with impoverished families, leading to increased youth delinquency.

Because the families living in the public housing project were trapped in poverty, they could not move into privatized housing. A lot of rooms were vacant in apartments so this led to landlords discovering they can make more money by turning off critical amenities like heat and water, and eventually setting fire to their apartments for the insurance money. The thousands of fires led to even more people being displaced in the Bronx.

=== Youth ===
The Cross Bronx Expressway affected the youth in South Bronx negatively. Just like with the parks commissioned by Robert Moses, the public housing projects and trash along the streets led to less sidewalks, which offered less opportunities for children to play under adult supervision. Children would play in vacated stores and other debris ridden areas. Not being able to work, as seen with such high youth unemployment rates, and not having many other options for what to do because of the construction of the Cross Bronx Expressway, youths joined gangs. A lot of the gangs were based on ethnicity, either to protect each other or to feel some sort of power. Children were less safe due to the conditions faced in their environments caused by the creation of the Cross Bronx Expressway and a lot of them, 7,500 children aged 14-19 years old, were in gangs. The gang culture was violent, but as Jeff Chang claims, kids "just didn’t go anywhere without backup".

=== Health issues ===
The Cross Bronx Expressway accounts for a large proportion of the Bronx's roadway and noise pollution. Bronx residents are more likely to have asthma than residents of other boroughs, and a large portion of those are children. Within the general Bronx population, there are 29.0 percent who identify as black and 55.0% who identified as Hispanic/Latino. The prevalence of children with asthma in the Bronx is higher than the national prevalence. Because things like dust, pollution, and other allergens serve as factors for developing asthma, children and adults of color living in low-income areas in the Bronx are at risk of suffering from asthma exacerbation. Asthma rates in the Bronx are three times higher than the national average. Many of the asthma cases were most commonly identified in families with lower median family incomes and lower median rent. It was found a large number of people who had asthma were considered to be in poverty. In the Morris Heights neighborhood of the West Bronx, where the Cross Bronx and Major Deegan Expressways intersect, air-pollution rates are also generally higher than in the rest of the borough. Other health consequences of living in close proximity to areas of high traffic included pre-term and birthweight infants and child leukemia.Noise pollution is also commonly produced by the Cross Bronx Expressway, and studies have shown the effects of noise pollution on cardiovascular health. To decrease emissions from the Cross Bronx Expressway, community activists proposed constructing a freeway lid in the early 2020s. The freeway lid, also named freeway caps, would introduce pollution solutions as well as an opportunity to engage in more physical activity. This could help contribute to solutions in reducing cardiovascular disease due to noise pollution

=== Congestion ===
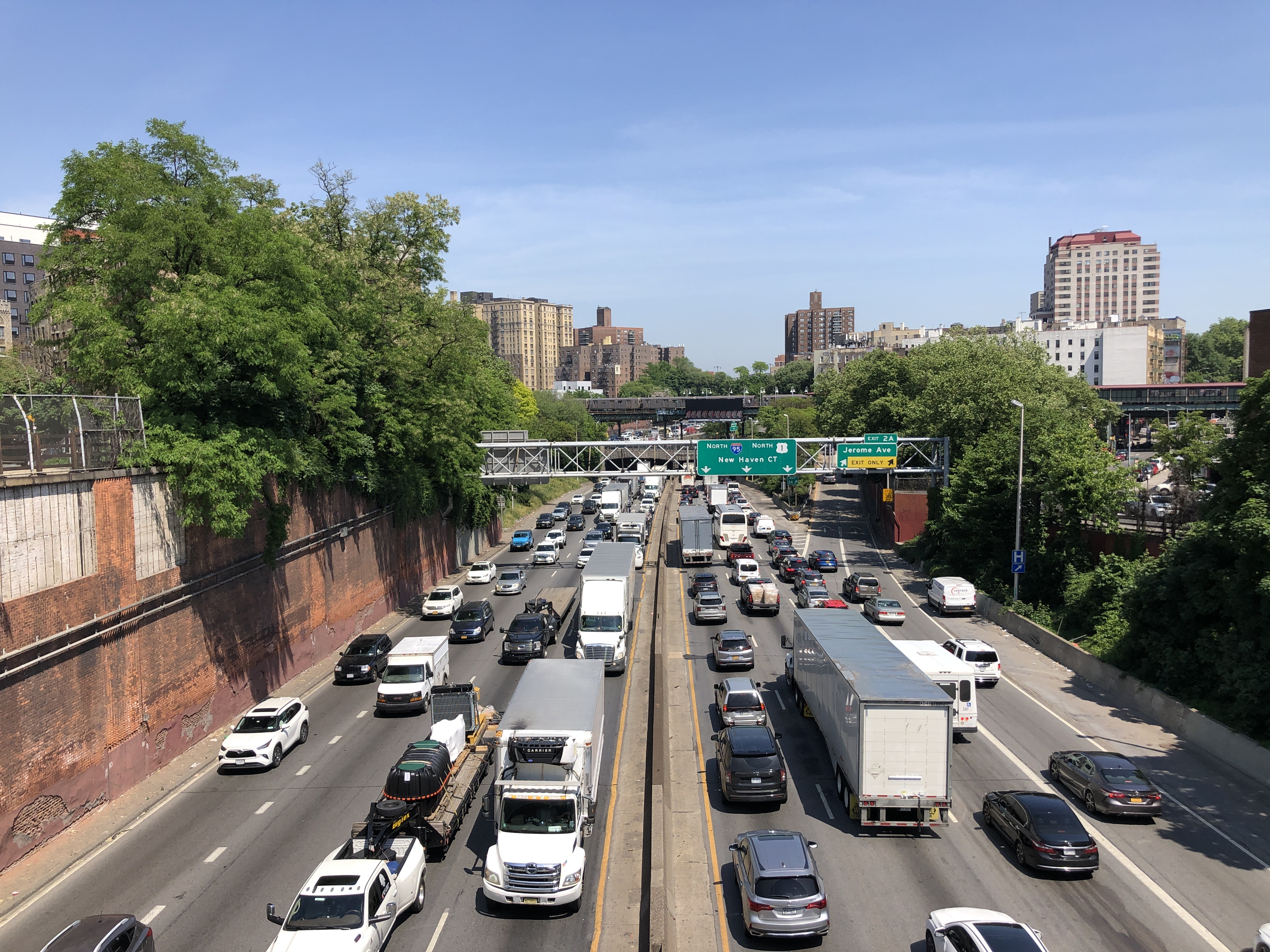
Congestion near the west end of the expressway

The expressway is one of the main routes for shipping and transportation through New York City due to its connections with New Jersey via the George Washington Bridge, Long Island via the Throgs Neck and Whitestone Bridges, Upstate New York via I-87 northbound and the Bronx River Parkway, Manhattan via I-87 southbound to the Robert F. Kennedy Bridge or the Trans-Manhattan Expressway (extension of the Cross Bronx Expressway westward) and the Henry Hudson Parkway, and New England via the New England Thruway (I-95) and the Hutchinson River Parkway. As such, the expressway is also known for its extreme traffic problems; in the 2000s, nearly 180,000 vehicles used the Cross Bronx's six lanes every day. It is not uncommon for truckers to use the Cross-Westchester Expressway to the New York State Thruway and the Major Deegan Expressway to get around this stretch of I-95.

In both 2008 and 2007, Inrix cited the Cross Bronx Expressway's westbound exit 4B (Bronx River Parkway) as being the worst interchange in the United States. In 2008, the expressway's exits included three out of the top four on the list, and four of the top five in 2007. Congestion is often exacerbated by the fact that large portions of the Cross Bronx Expressway does not meet modern Interstate standards, with lanes measuring 12 feet (3.7 m) wide, as well as the relative lack of arterial roads between the West Bronx and East Bronx. Large portions of the expressway do not have shoulders, so even minor breakdowns could cause congestion. A 2002 study by the New York State Department of Transportation found that the expressway also had short entrance and exit ramps, poor sightlines, and dim lighting. Other issues were caused by the fact that the expressway's service roads were discontinuous, forcing traffic onto the expressway or local streets.

Proposals have been made to make dedicated truck lanes, add express bus service, and build decking on the open trenches to allow for parks, although to no avail. In 2022, the Metropolitan Transportation Authority released an environmental impact statement, which detailed the possible impacts of a planned congestion pricing zone in New York City. The study found that, if the zone were implemented, up to 700 additional trucks per day would use the Cross Bronx Expressway to avoid the congestion pricing zone. After congestion pricing was enacted in 2025, traffic on the Cross Bronx Expressway increased as well, leading to concerns that the toll would worsen already-high levels of air pollution.

== Exit list ==
The mileposts below follow actual signage, even though the route is continuous. The entire route is in the New York City borough of the Bronx.

Location	mi	km	Exit	Destinations	Notes
Morris Heights	1.41	2.27	–	I-95 south / US 1 south (Alexander Hamilton Bridge) – George Washington Bridge, Newark, NJ	Continuation south; western end of I-95/US 1 concurrency
Morris Heights	1.41	2.27	1B	To Amsterdam Avenue	Westbound exit and eastbound entrance; access via Washington Bridge
Morris Heights	1.41	2.27	1C-D	I-87 (Major Deegan Expressway) – Albany, Queens, Yankee Stadium	Signed as exits 1C (north) and 1D (south); exits 7N on I-87
Morris Heights	2.08	3.35	2A	Jerome Avenue	
Morris Heights	2.08	3.35	Tunnel under Jennie Jerome Playground		
Tremont	2.66	4.28	2B	US 1 north (Webster Avenue)	Eastbound exit and westbound entrance; eastern end of US 1 concurrency
Tremont	2.95	4.75	3	Third Avenue to US 1 north (Webster Avenue)	Westbound exit and eastbound entrance
West Farms			Tunnel under East 176th Street		
West Farms	3.97	6.39	4A	NY 895 south (Sheridan Boulevard) – RFK Bridge	Eastbound exit and westbound entrance; former I-895
Soundview	4.34	6.98	4B	Bronx River Parkway north / Rosedale Avenue	Exit 4 on Bronx River Parkway
Parkchester	5.05	8.13	5A	White Plains Road / Westchester Avenue	
Parkchester			Tunnel under Hugh J. Grant Circle		
Castle Hill	5.60	9.01	5B	Castle Hill Avenue	Eastbound exit and westbound entrance
Throggs Neck	5.76 9.79	9.27 15.76	6A	I-678 south – Whitestone Bridge, Queens	Eastbound exit and westbound entrance; exit 19S on I-678
Throggs Neck	5.76 9.79	9.27 15.76	6B	I-95 north (Bruckner Expressway) – New Haven I-295 begins	Eastbound exit and westbound entrance; eastern end of I-95 concurrency; northern terminus of I-295
Throggs Neck			12	I-278 west (Bruckner Expressway) – Manhattan	Westbound exit and eastbound entrance; eastern terminus of I-278
Throggs Neck	8.81	14.18	11	Randall Avenue	
Throggs Neck	8.04	12.94	10	I-695 north to I-95 north – New Haven, CT	Westbound exit and eastbound entrance; southern terminus of I-695
Throggs Neck	7.71	12.41	9	Harding Avenue / Pennyfield Avenue	
Throggs Neck	7.31	11.76	–	I-295 Toll south (Throgs Neck Bridge) – Long Island	Continuation south; eastern end of I-295 concurrency
1.000 mi = 1.609 km; 1.000 km = 0.621 mi: Concurrency terminus; Electronic toll collection; Incomplete access

== Sources ==
- Caro, Robert (1974). The Power Broker: Robert Moses and the Fall of New York. New York: Knopf. ISBN 978-0-394-48076-3.
