= New York State Route 895 =

Highway in New York

New York State Route 895
- Sheridan Boulevard
- Map of the Bronx in New York City with NY 895 highlighted in red

Route information
- Maintained by NYSDOT
- Length: 1.29 mi (2.08 km)
- History: Completed in 1963 as I-278; Renumbered to I-895 on January 1, 1970; Decommissioned as Interstate on September 24, 2017

Major junctions
- South end: I-278 in Hunts Point
- North end: I-95 / East 177th Street / East Tremont Avenue in West Farms

Location
- Country: United States
- State: New York
- Counties: Bronx

Highway system
- New York Highways; Interstate; US; State; Reference; Parkways
← NY 890	→ NY 961F

New York State Route 895 (NY 895), known locally as Sheridan Boulevard, is a state highway in the New York City borough of The Bronx. Its south end is at a merge with the Bruckner Expressway (I-278) in the Hunts Point neighborhood, and its north end is at the Cross Bronx Expressway (I-95), where the road connects with local streets in the West Farms neighborhood.

The route opened to traffic in 1963 as a freeway known as the Arthur V. Sheridan Expressway, and it was designated as Interstate 895 (I-895) in 1970. The expressway, colloquially called "The Sheridan", was co-named for the Bronx Borough Commissioner of Public Works Arthur V. Sheridan, who died in a car crash in 1952. I-895 was supposed to connect back to I-95, its parent route, further north in Eastchester. However, due to community opposition, this extension was never built. As a result, I-895 saw relatively little use, since it ran parallel to the longer Bronx River Parkway.

In the 1990s, community groups began advocating for most of I-895 to be demoted to a boulevard. These groups cited the Sheridan Expressway's negative impact on the community. In the 2000s and 2010s, the city and state investigated ways to integrate the highway with the neighboring community. I-895 was downgraded to a state route in September 2017, in preparation for its conversion into Sheridan Boulevard. The conversion of most of NY 895 into a boulevard began in September 2018, and it was completed on December 11, 2019.

This is one of two "state route 895"s that have also been designated as "Interstate 895", although Virginia's version was never signed as an Interstate due to a number of factors that prevented such from occurring.

== Route description ==
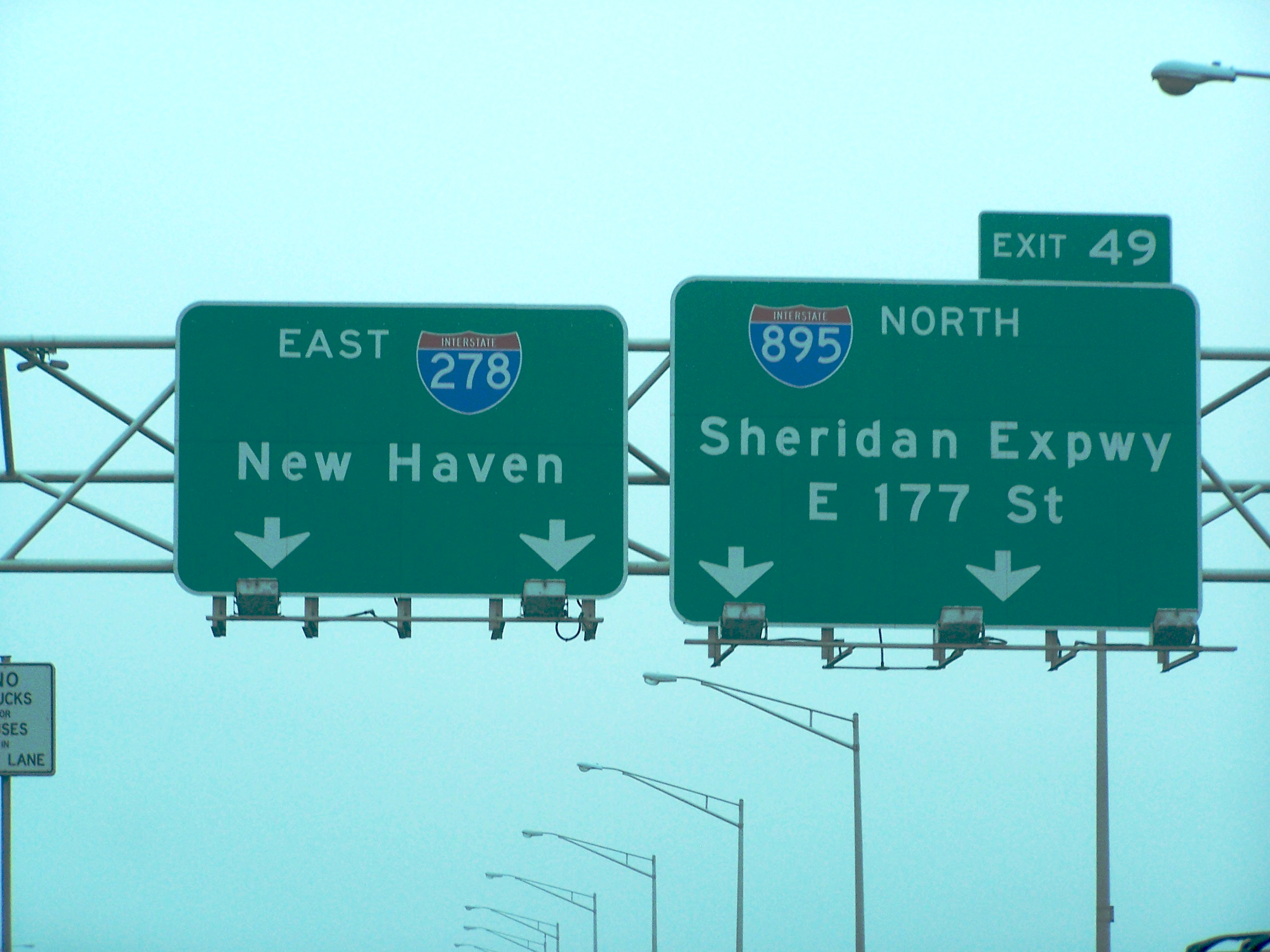
Overhead guide signs for the Sheridan on the Bruckner Expressway, before I-895 was decommissioned in 2017

NY 895 begins at exit 49 on I-278, also known as the Bruckner Expressway, in the Hunts Point neighborhood of the Bronx. The road heads northward as a two-lane freeway, paralleling the Bronx River and the Amtrak-owned Northeast Corridor railroad tracks. There is one intermediate interchange, which is for Westchester Avenue, about 0.6 miles (1.0 km) north of the split from the Bruckner Expressway, where the road becomes a four-lane freeway.

After curving slightly to the northeast, the road becomes a four-lane boulevard and intersects Jennings Street. A frontage road begins to parallel the Sheridan on the east side until it terminates at a cul-de-sac in East Tremont, while the bidirectional West Farms Road also parallels the road on its west side. The Sheridan crosses under East 174th Street and officially ends at an interchange with the Cross Bronx Expressway (I-95) in East Tremont. The roadway continues beyond the Cross Bronx as a short connector to local West Farms streets.

For its entire route, NY 895 parallels the Bronx River, which is located to the highway's east. Amtrak's Northeast Corridor also runs parallel to both the Bronx River and NY 895, crossing the Bronx River north of Westchester Avenue. The New York City Subway's Whitlock Avenue station, served by the 6 train, is located above and adjacent to the boulevard south of Westchester Avenue. As a former Interstate Highway, NY 895 is part of the National Highway System.

== History ==
=== Planning and construction ===
In 1941, the New York City Planning Department and city planner Robert Moses proposed a short expressway route to connect the Bronx Crosstown Highway (now the Cross Bronx Expressway) and the Southern Boulevard Express Highway (now the Bruckner Expressway). The new highway would be an alternative to the Bronx River Parkway that could be used by commercial vehicles, since these vehicles were banned from parkways in New York. The route was originally named the Bronx River Expressway. This was part of a larger network of highways in New York City, which was to cost $800 million (equivalent to $14.4 billion in 2025). In February 1945, the city agreed to pay $60 million (equivalent to $849 million in 2025) of that cost. That November, the city, state, and federal governments agreed to fund several new highways in New York City. Among these was the Bronx River Expressway, which was to cost $7.18 million.

In August 1952, following the death of Arthur V. Sheridan, Bronx borough president James J. Lyons proposed renaming the planned highway after Sheridan; according to Lyons, the expressway had been one of Sheridan's "pet projects". The law enacting the name change was signed by mayor Vincent R. Impellitteri on February 18, 1953. Two years later, officials announced plans for the first portion of the Bruckner Expressway, consisting of a 2-mile (3.2 km) elevated expressway above Bruckner Boulevard from the Triborough Bridge to Longfellow Avenue. North of Longfellow Avenue, the highway would continue at ground level as the Sheridan Expressway, running northward for another 1.5 miles (2.4 km) to the Cross Bronx Expressway.

Interstate 895
- Location: The Bronx
- Length: 1.29 mi (2.08 km)
- Existed: 1970–2017

Construction began in 1958. The highway was built parallel to the Bronx River on the former site of Starlight Park, an amusement park that was condemned to provide the right-of-way for both the Sheridan and Cross Bronx Expressways. As part of the project, a city park, also called Starlight Park, was created in its place. An additional park, Daniel Boone Playground, was also created on land condemned for the expressway. Thousands of residents were displaced by the expressway's construction. A 1-acre (0.40 ha) plot at the southeast corner of the Bronx Zoo was also acquired for the highway's proposed expansion past the Cross Bronx Expressway, even though the Sheridan Expressway was ultimately not built that far.

=== Opening and canceled extension ===
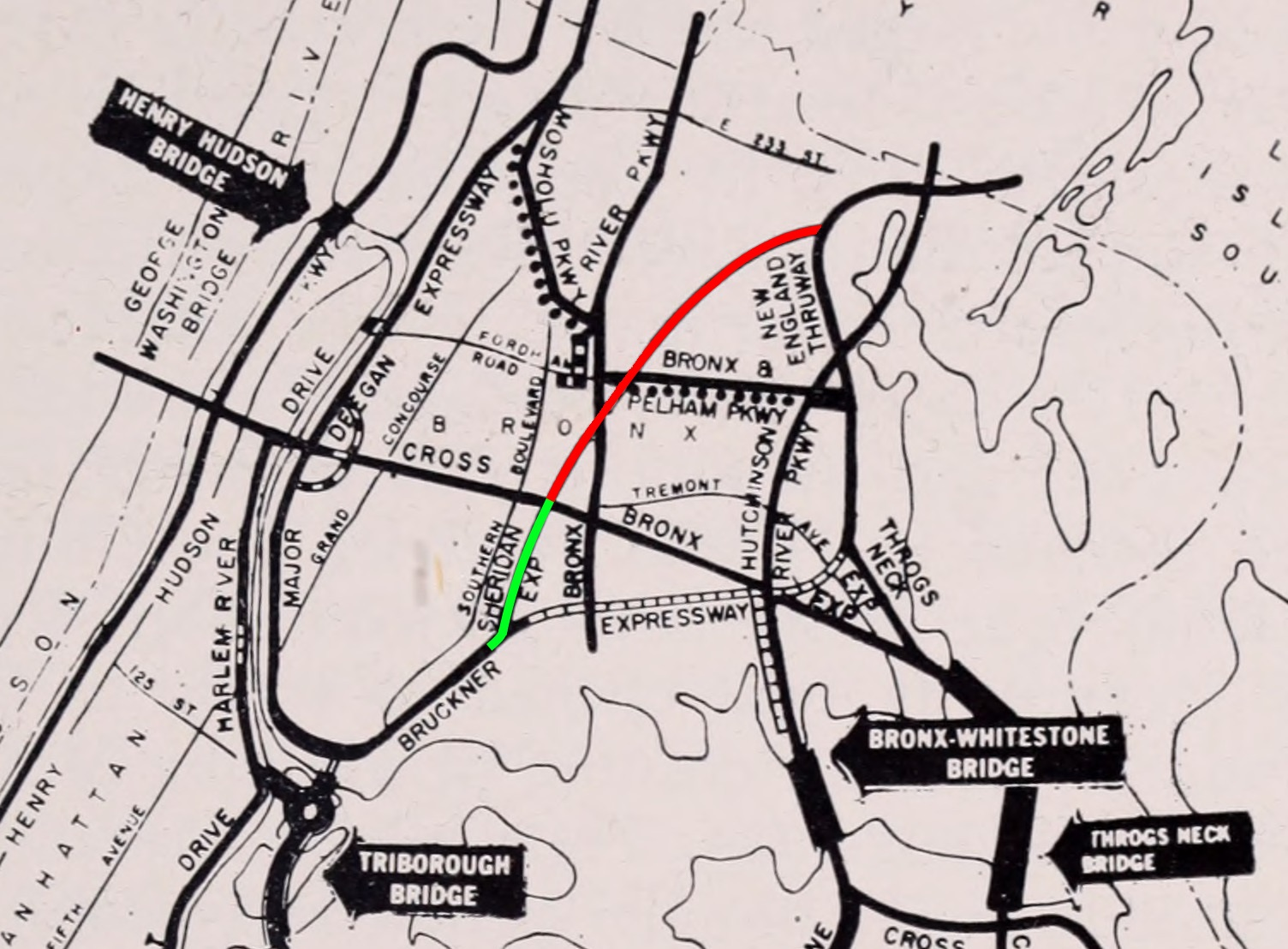
A 1964 highway map showing the completed portion of the expressway (green), and the unbuilt extension (red).

The $9.5 million expressway was opened to traffic on February 6, 1963. Over the years, the expressway has received a number of Interstate designations. It was originally designated as I-695 in late 1958. In early 1959, the highway designation was changed to I-895, but I-278 was rerouted to use the Sheridan Expressway later that year. The highway was thus known as I-278 when it opened in 1963. On January 1, 1970, I-278 was realigned to follow the Bruckner Expressway east to the Bruckner Interchange while the Sheridan Expressway was redesignated as I-895.

The Sheridan Expressway was originally planned to extend northeast to the New England Thruway (I-95) in Eastchester just north of Co-op City, creating a shortcut toward New England and a direct route to New England from the Triborough Bridge. The extension would have been built along Boston Road (U.S. Route 1) through Bronx Park and Northeast Bronx. Shortly after the opening of the first segment of the expressway, it was projected that construction of the first extension to the Bronx River Parkway would begin 1965, and the final segment to the New England Thruway in 1967. However, the project, like other Robert Moses highways, faced increasing community opposition. It was cancelled by Governor Nelson Rockefeller in 1971, one year before its originally projected completion, though construction on the extension never started.

Because of the cancellation of the extension, the Sheridan was locally seen as a stub highway with very little utility, serving the same movements as the Major Deegan Expressway (I-87) and Bronx River Parkway. In 2011, the New York City Department of Transportation and the New York City Economic Development Corporation conducted a study of trucks entering and leaving the Hunts Point Cooperative Market, a large food market located near the Sheridan Expressway's south end. The study found that only 19% of drivers headed to or from Hunts Point Market used the Sheridan, while an average of 51% of drivers used the Bruckner Expressway and another 30% used local streets.

=== Refurbishment and decommissioning plan ===
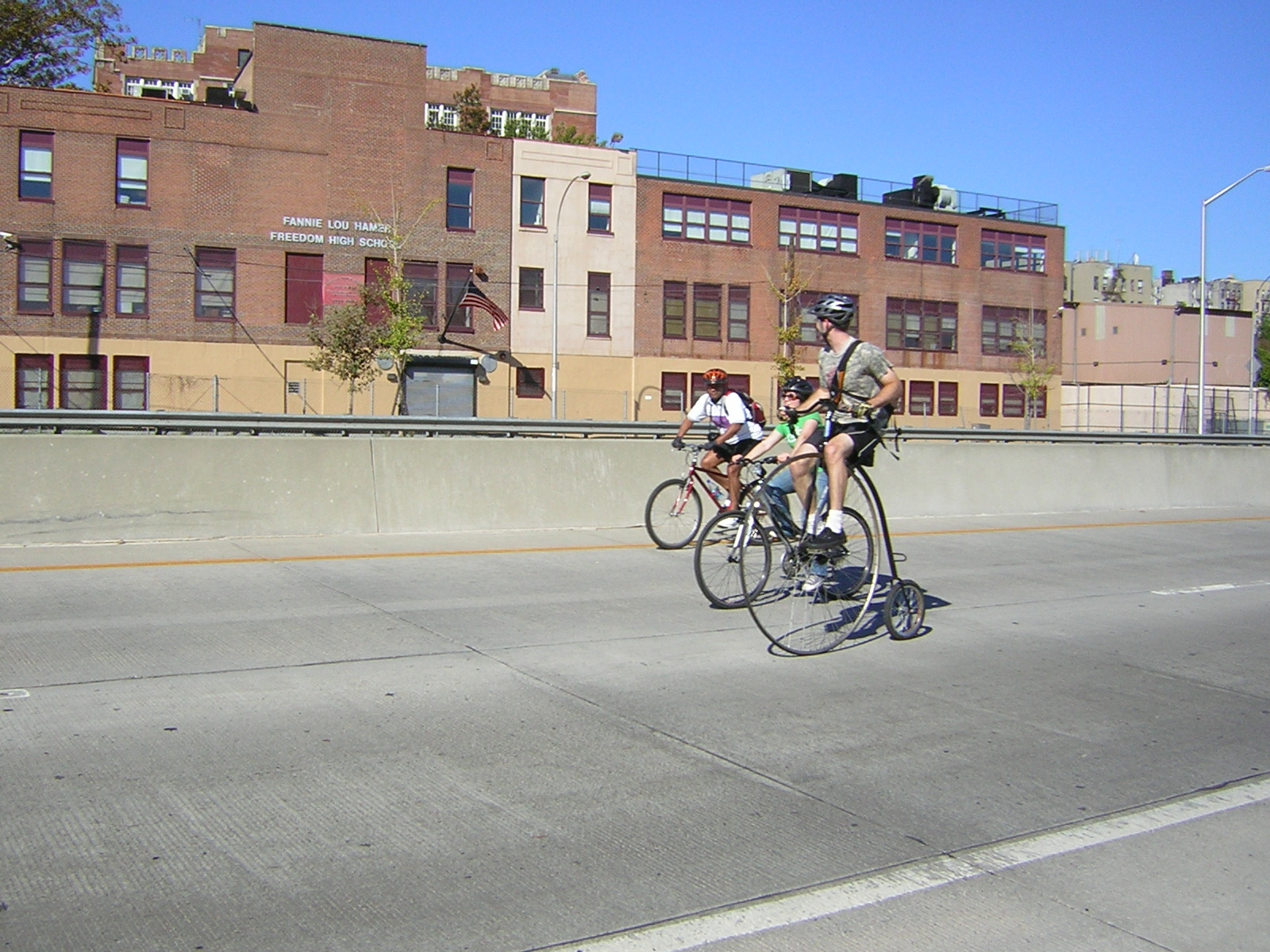
Bicycling on the Sheridan during Transportation Alternatives' 2007 "Tour de Bronx"

The New York State Department of Transportation (NYSDOT) started studying ways to reduce congestion and improve safety at the Sheridan Expressway's southern interchange with the Bruckner Expressway. The NYSDOT proposed expanding the highway in the late 1990s. The plan faced opposition rooted in claims of environmental justice from community groups, most notably the Southern Bronx River Watershed Alliance, which proposed an alternative that called for the expressway to be replaced with affordable housing, schools, and a park. At the time, the nearby, parallel Bronx River Parkway saw twice as many daily vehicles as did the Sheridan Expressway: in 2001, I-895 carried 37,000 daily vehicles, while the Bronx River Parkway carried 60,000 to 100,000 daily vehicles. Residents also opposed a proposal to connect the expressway with Hunts Point Market to the south, saying that the NYSDOT had not consulted them about plans for the connection. Some community groups created an alliance called the Southern Bronx River Watershed Alliance (SBRWA), which began devising plans for removing the highway.

In 2001, the NYSDOT again started looking at ways to improve I-895, especially at the Bruckner Expressway junction, a source of congestion due to a merge in the southbound/westbound directions. Local groups advocated for the Sheridan Expressway's removal because it isolated Hunts Point from the rest of the Bronx, and proposed that new ramps from the Bruckner Expressway be built for trucks going to Hunts Point Market. However, the NYSDOT stated that removing the highway would force expressway traffic to use local streets instead. An environmental impact statement was started in 2003. In a final scoping document for the proposal in 2003, the NYSDOT conducted studies of the neighborhood and found that the best option was to make the interchange with Bruckner Expressway a full interchange, with the Sheridan Expressway able to access both directions of the expressway and vice versa. The Sheridan Expressway itself would be decommissioned, and several alternatives all proposed easier access to Hunts Point Market.

In 2008, the NYSDOT announced that it was holding talks with community officials for an alternative community plan. The state studied the feasibility of removing I-895, releasing its results in July 2010. The state's study showed that local traffic would be worsened if the highway was removed. At this point, I-895 carried 50,000 daily vehicles. Later the same year, local community groups received a $1.5 million federal grant to study the potential removal of the highway. The administration of New York City mayor Michael Bloomberg was also opposed to the removal. The dispute between the local community and the city and state governments led to a stalemate, what the Daily News called a "crossroads" and "a road to nowhere". The plan was dropped after the Hunts Point Terminal Produce Cooperative threatened to move to New Jersey if I-895 were demolished.

In 2013, the city conducted a study of the Sheridan Expressway. The study recommended downgrading the northern part of the expressway to an at-grade boulevard, connecting the three parks along the waterfront, and creating or improving vehicular ramps between the new boulevard, I-278, and the Hunts Point neighborhood. The decommissioning proposal consisted of two options: retaining the separate West Farms Road parallel to the expressway or combining the two arteries. Both proposals involved demolishing the frontage road east of the expressway. City officials presented the plans to the SBRWA in May 2013. The next month, the city government officially endorsed the plan, which was expected to cost $117 million.

=== Conversion to boulevard ===
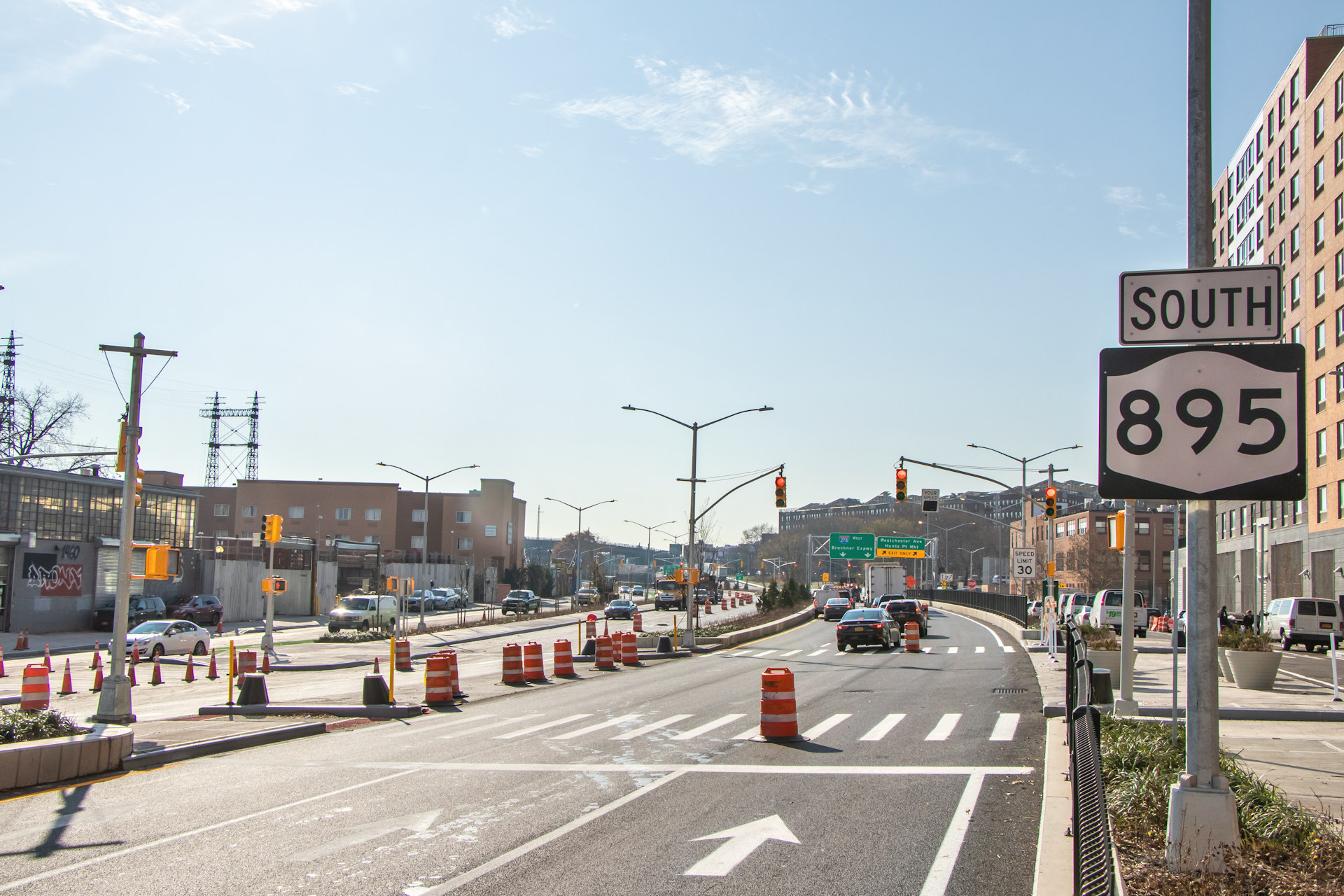
NY 895 (Sheridan Blvd)

In March 2017, Governor Andrew Cuomo announced that the expressway would be replaced with a boulevard. The 2017 New York State budget included $97 million for decommissioning the Interstate designation and the Sheridan Expressway, as recommended by the New York City Council and New York City Department of Transportation. Another $600 million was later added to the state budget for decommissioning the highway, bringing the total budget to nearly $700 million. The decommissioning would comprise the first phase of a project that would cost a total of $1.8 billion. On September 24, 2017, the American Association of State Highway and Transportation Officials decommissioned I-895, and the road was redesignated as New York State Route 895 (NY 895). The signs for I-895 were not immediately replaced with NY 895 shields. Despite no longer being an Interstate Highway, NY 895 remained part of the National Network.

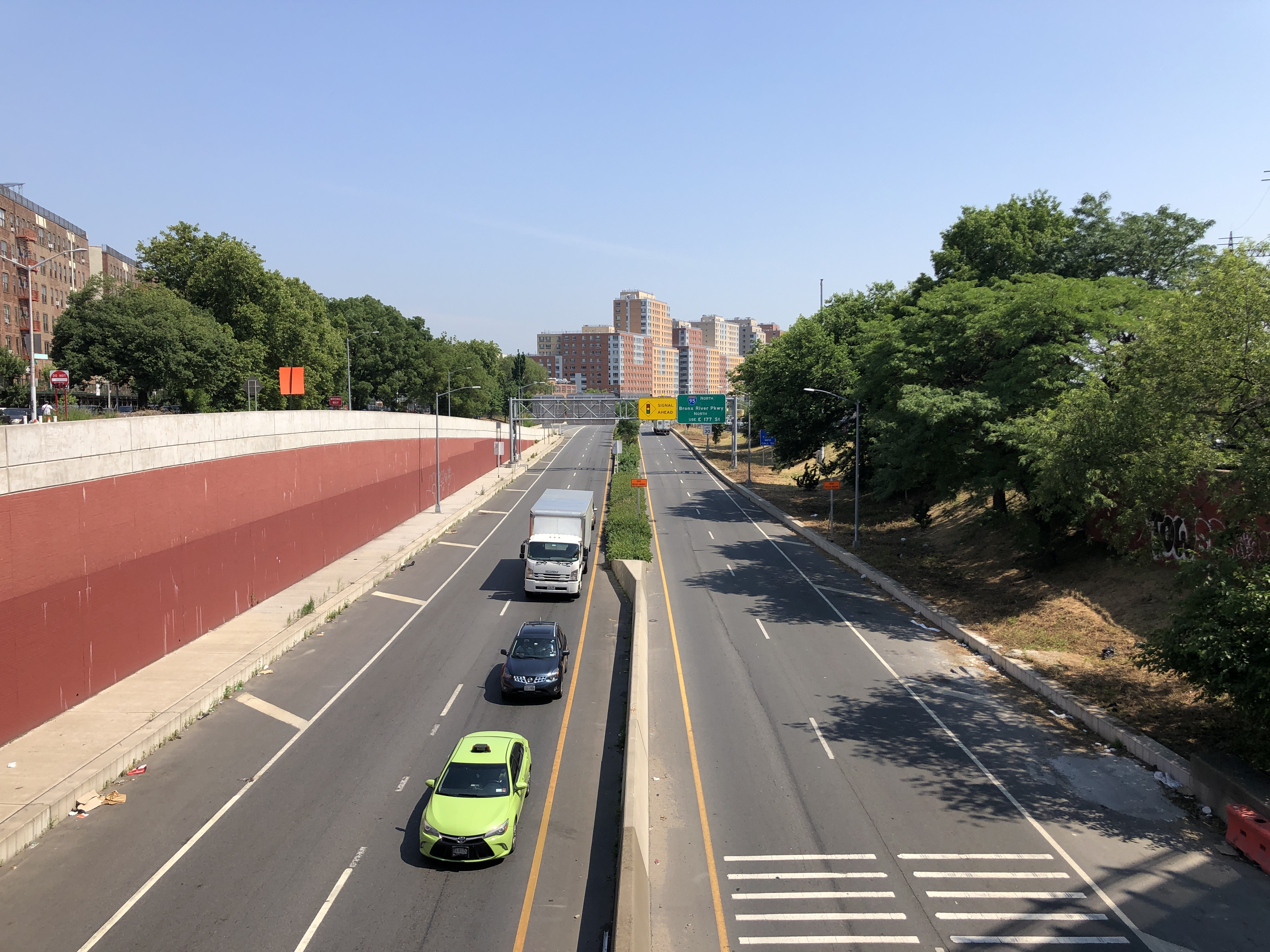
NY 895 northbound at Westchester Avenue

The plans called for the expressway to be demolished and converted into a lower-speed boulevard called "Sheridan Boulevard" by 2019. The new boulevard would include traffic lights at Jennings, 172nd, and 173rd Streets, with crosswalks that connect the residential area on the current expressway's west side with Starlight Park on its east. The boulevard would run parallel to West Farms Road, in a manner similar to the first of the city's two proposals for downgrading the highway. As of 2017, the park was only accessible via the East 174th Street bridge that crosses both the expressway and the Bronx River. The project was expected to improve pedestrian safety and access to both Starlight Park and the Bronx River shoreline. The Federal Highway Administration (FHA)'s acting head wrote a letter to NYSDOT officials in June 2018, stating that the NYSDOT "provide[d] adequate justification" to downgrade the former I-895 into a boulevard. The federal government approved the conversion of NY 895 into a boulevard on September 19, 2018. The NYSDOT immediately announced that work would begin on decommissioning the highway within a week, and that the project would be complete by late 2019. The conversion was completed on December 11, 2019.

Another part of the project entailed constructing exit ramps to Edgewater Road from southbound NY 895, as well as from both directions of I-278, providing direct access to Hunts Point Market. In addition, an entrance ramp to northbound NY 895 would be built from Edgewater Road. Most of the project's cost would come from building these ramps. At the time of the proposal, up to 13,000 trucks per day simply detoured through local streets to get to the market, which elicited complaints from residents. The state also announced in mid-2019 that it would start construction on the exit ramp to Edgewater Road from southbound NY 895. Construction on the first phase of the Edgewater Road access project began that year; the work included replacing existing overpasses and building the new ramps. The first phase was completed on October 31, 2022, consisting of the three ramps to and from NY 895. Two other phases included rebuilding portions of the Bruckner Expressway in the vicinity of the NY 895 interchange, to be completed by 2025. The first two ramps that were built as part of the second phase opened in late 2022, and a new ramp from Sheridan Boulevard to the westbound Cross Bronx Expressway was also built. Workers began reconstructing the ramps to and from the Bruckner Expressway in early 2023. That September, the intersections with 172nd and 173rd Streets were reconfigured; this allowed traffic from Sheridan Boulevard to access 172nd Street, and it also allowed traffic from 173rd Street to access Sheridan Boulevard.

== Major intersections ==
The entire route is in the New York City borough of the Bronx.

Location	mi	km	Destinations	Notes
Hunts Point	0.00	0.00	I-278 west to I-87 north – Robert F. Kennedy Bridge	Southern terminus; exit 49 on I-278
Hunts Point	0.20	0.32	Edgewater Road – Hunts Point Market	No southbound entrance
Hunts Point	0.61	0.98	Westchester Avenue – Hunts Point Market	No southbound entrance
Hunts Point			Northern end of freeway section	
West Farms	1.29	2.08	I-95 south (Cross Bronx Expressway) – George Washington Bridge	No northbound entrance; exit 4A on I-95
West Farms	1.5	2.4	East 177th Street / East Tremont Avenue	Northern terminus
1.000 mi = 1.609 km; 1.000 km = 0.621 mi: Incomplete access
