= Alexander Hamilton Bridge =

Bridge between Manhattan and the Bronx, New York

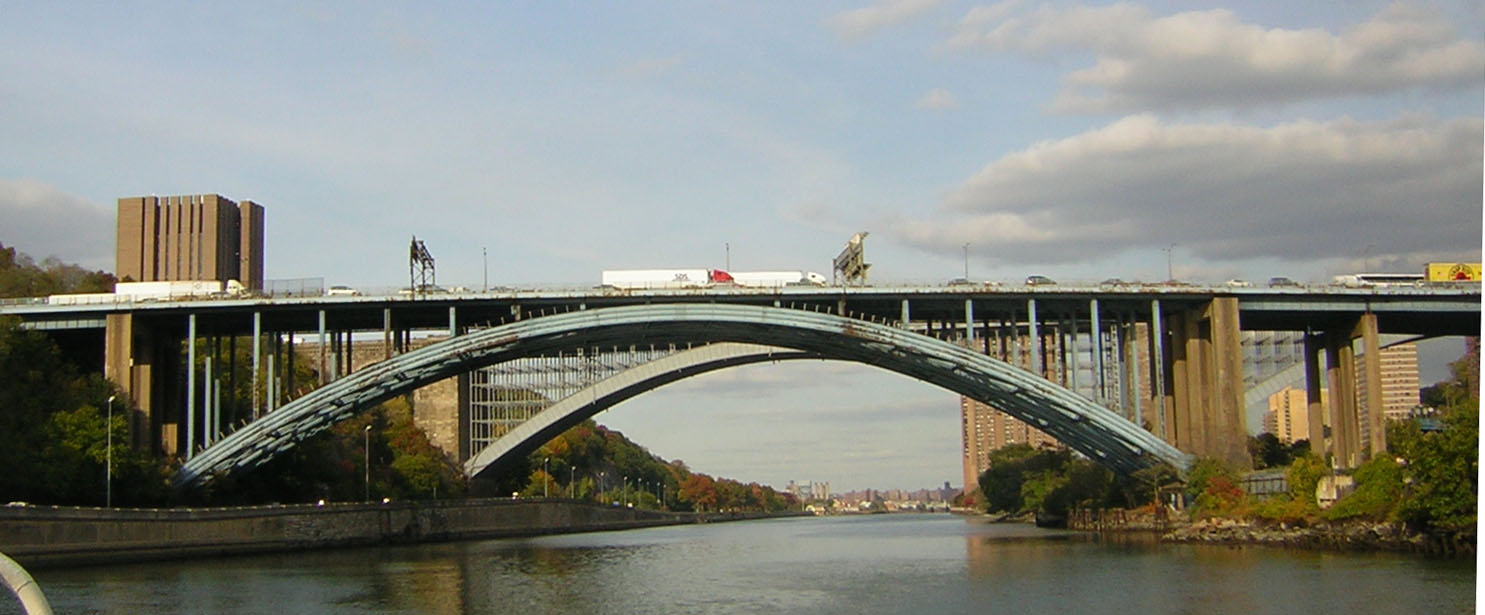
- Alexander Hamilton Bridge crossing the Harlem River in November 2007
- Coordinates: 40.8456°N 73.9287°W
- Carries: 8 lanes of I-95 / US 1
- Crosses: Harlem River
- Locale: Manhattan and The Bronx in New York City
- Named for: Alexander Hamilton
- Maintained by: NYSDOT

Characteristics
- Design: Open-spandrel deck arch bridge
- Total length: 2,375 feet (724 m)
- Width
- Longest span: 555 feet (169 m)
- Clearance below: 103 feet (31 m)

History
- Opened: January 15, 1963

Statistics
- Daily traffic: 177,853 (2016)
- Toll: none

Location
- Interactive map of Alexander Hamilton Bridge

The Alexander Hamilton Bridge is an eight-lane steel arch bridge that carries traffic over the Harlem River between the boroughs of Manhattan and the Bronx in New York City. The bridge connects the Trans-Manhattan Expressway in the Washington Heights section of Manhattan with the Cross Bronx Expressway as part of Interstate 95 (I-95) and U.S. Route 1 (US 1).

The bridge, named for Founding Father Alexander Hamilton, opened to traffic on January 15, 1963, the same day that the Cross Bronx Expressway was completed. For 2011, the New York City Department of Transportation, which operates and maintains the bridge, reported an average daily traffic (ADT) volume in both directions of 182,174, having reached a peak ADT of 192,848 in 1990.

== Design ==
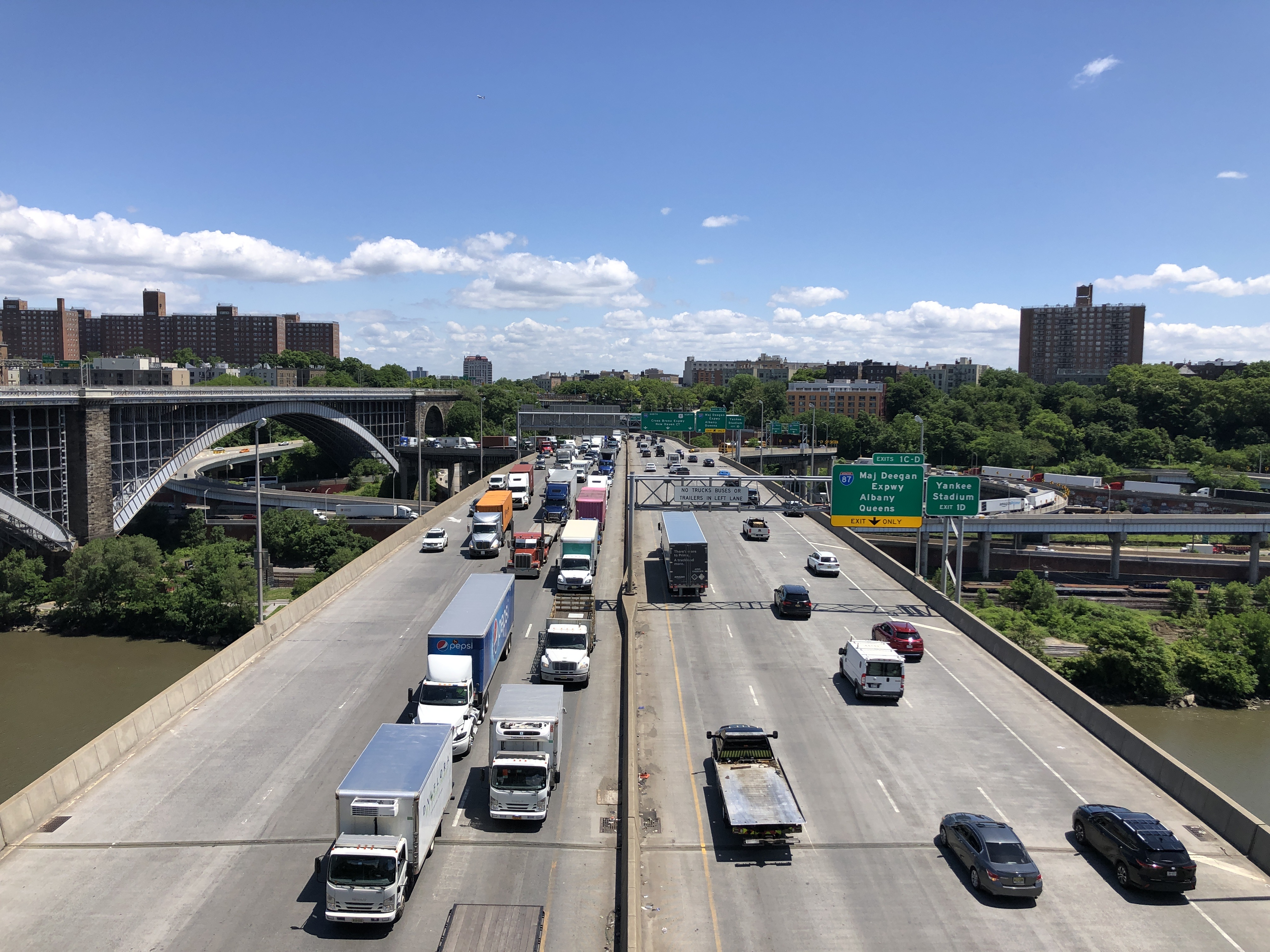
Alexander Hamilton Bridge in May 2024

The total length of the bridge, including approaches, is 2,375 feet (724 m). Its parallel main spans are 555 feet (169 m) long and provide 103 feet (31 m) of vertical clearance over the Harlem River at the center and 366 feet (112 m) of horizontal clearance.

The bridge design included a set of spiraling ramps (officially known as the Highbridge Interchange and colloquially known as "The Corkscrew") to connect to and from the Major Deegan Expressway (completed in 1964) and a viaduct ramp connecting to Harlem River Drive, both of which are over 100 feet (30 m) below the level of the bridge, and access to Amsterdam Avenue.

== History ==
After the George Washington Bridge connecting Manhattan and New Jersey was completed in 1931, vehicles traveling between New Jersey and The Bronx would use the Washington Bridge, which crosses the Harlem River just north of the present Alexander Hamilton Bridge. The Alexander Hamilton Bridge was planned in the mid-1950s to connect Robert Moses's proposed Trans-Manhattan and Cross-Bronx Expressways and to accommodate the additional traffic resulting from the addition of the six-lane lower level to the George Washington Bridge. With the Interstate designation, 90% of the $21 million in construction costs were covered by the federal government. The bridge opened on January 15, 1963.

Starting in 2009, the bridge underwent a full renovation. China Construction America received the $407 million contract for the project. The Chinese firm completed the renovation under budget and 35 days ahead of schedule. While the traffic jams created from the construction had not been as bad as local officials had anticipated, inbound delays at the Hudson River crossings increased after the project began. In July 2014, Governor Andrew Cuomo announced that the bridge renovation was complete.

== See also ==
- List of bridges documented by the Historic American Engineering Record in New York (state)
