= Kennedy Airport Interchange =

Highway interchange in Queens, New York

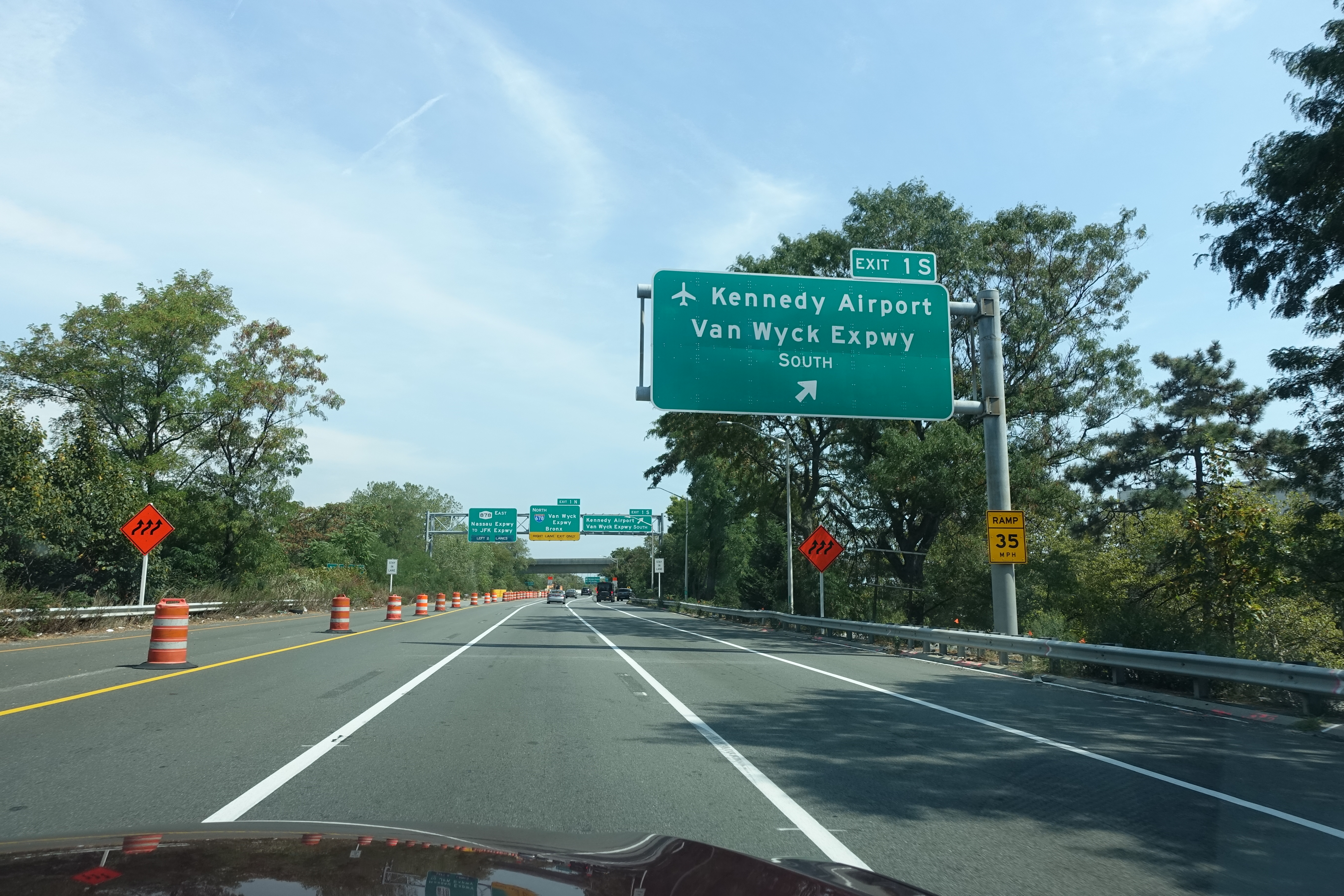
- Eastbound I-878 approaching the Kennedy Airport Interchange in 2022
- Interactive map of Kennedy Airport Interchange

Location
- Queens, New York
- Coordinates: 40.665797°N 73.797433°W
- Roads at junction: I-678; I-878 / NY 878; NY 27; Belt Parkway; JFK Expressway; 150th Street

Construction
- Type: Hybrid interchange
- Opened: 1948–1950
- Reconstructed: 1960s, 1980s

The Kennedy Airport Interchange is a large highway interchange located along the northern boundary of John F. Kennedy International Airport in the borough of Queens, in New York City, New York, United States.

== Description ==
The Kennedy Airport Interchange serves as a major access point to and from Kennedy Airport, in addition to points east, north, and west. It is a junction point for four controlled-access highways (the Belt Parkway, the Van Wyck Expressway (I-678), the Nassau Expressway (I-878 / NY 878), and the JFK Expressway), as well as two major surface streets (North / South Conduit Avenue (NY 27) and 150th Street).

A stub ramp exists on the JFK Expressway at the interchange for a future connection to the unbuilt westbound lanes of the Nassau Expressway. A proposal to construct the westbound lanes of the Nassau Expressway through the interchange was cancelled in 1995.

== History ==
The Kennedy Airport Interchange was built by Robert Moses in 1948, as part of the construction of the Van Wyck Expressway to JFK Airport (at the time known as both New York International Airport and Idlewild Airport). Originally, the interchange was a standard cloverleaf, with ramps connecting the Van Wyck Expressway to North / South Conduit Avenue (NY 27); connections between the Belt (Southern) Parkway and the Van Wyck were made via North / South Conduit Avenue, which flank the sides of the Belt Parkway. It partially opened in 1948, in time for the opening of JFK Airport, with the Van Wyck extending south to the airport's terminal area from the interchange. The rest of the original interchange opened in 1950, upon the opening of the segment of the Van Wyck north to Queens Boulevard.

In the 1960s, the interchange was modified and expanded as part of the project to construct the Nassau Expressway (Interstate 878). As part of the project, the interchange's two southern "cloverleaf" ramps were demolished and replaced with more a more complex configuration.

When the Clearview Expressway was originally planned, it was to continue south to JFK Airport, and connect with the interchange – but those plans were ultimately cancelled in 1971. In the 1980s, the Port Authority of New York and New Jersey constructed the JFK Expressway, providing another expressway connection to the airport, along parts of the cancelled extension of the Clearview Expressway. The northern terminus of this new highway would be at the east end of the interchange, which required further modifying and expanding it; this segment of the expressway opened c. 1986.

== See also ==
- Newark Airport Interchange
- Kew Gardens Interchange
- Bruckner Interchange
