= Interstate 78 in New York =

Highway in New York

Interstate 78
- Map of Lower Manhattan with I-78 highlighted in red

Route information
- Maintained by PANYNJ
- Length: 0.5 mi (800 m)
- Existed: 1978–present
- NHS: Entire route
- Restrictions: No hazardous goods

Major junctions
- West end: I-78 / Route 139 at the New Jersey state line in Jersey City, New Jersey
- East end: Canal Street in Tribeca

Location
- Country: United States
- State: New York
- County: New York

Highway system
- Interstate Highway System; Main; Auxiliary; Suffixed; Business; Future; New York Highways; Interstate; US; State; Reference; Parkways
← NY 77A	→ NY 78

Interstate 78 (I-78) is a part of the Interstate Highway System that runs from Union Township, Lebanon County, Pennsylvania, to New York City. In the US state of New York, I-78 extends 1/2 mile (800 m). The entirety of I-78 consists of the Holland Tunnel, which crosses under the Hudson River from New Jersey and ends at an exit rotary in Lower Manhattan. The tunnel and its approaches are maintained by the Port Authority of New York and New Jersey (PANYNJ).

I-78 was planned to take a longer route when the Interstate System within New York City was originally proposed in the late 1950s. The proposed route of I-78 was to head east via the Williamsburg Bridge to John F. Kennedy International Airport and then north over the Throgs Neck Bridge to I-95 in the Bronx. One unbuilt section of I-78, the Lower Manhattan Expressway, would have connected the Holland Tunnel to the Williamsburg and Manhattan Bridges. Another unbuilt section, the Cross-Brooklyn and Bushwick Expressways, would have extended southeast across Brooklyn, connecting to what is now the Nassau Expressway (New York State Route 878 or NY 878). A third section would have connected the Nassau Expressway, at the southern edge of Queens near JFK Airport, to the southern end of what is now I-295, in central Queens. Due to opposition from the communities along the expressways' routes, these sections of I-78 were never built, and I-78 does not connect to I-278 or to any of its other auxiliary routes.

== Route description ==
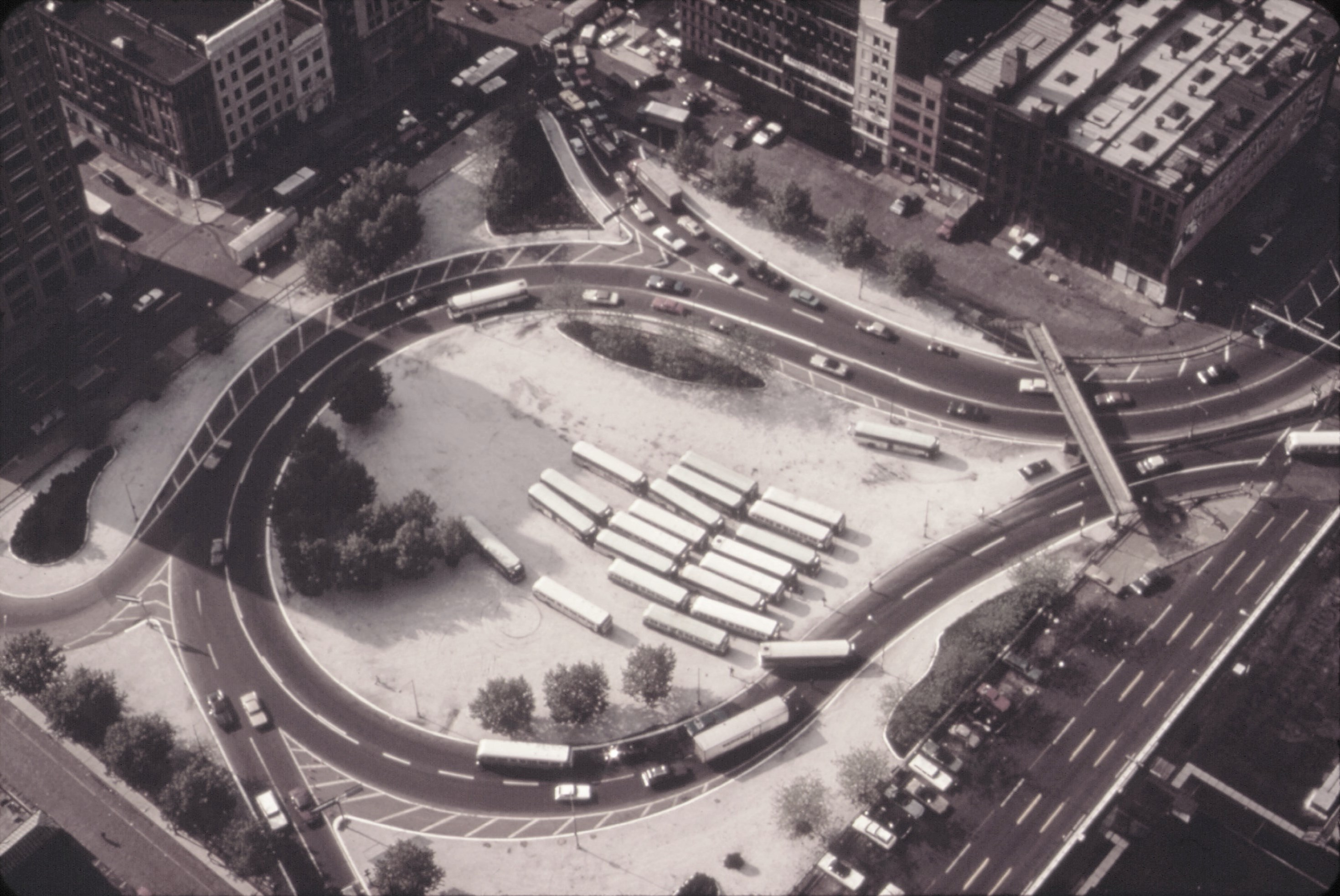
Aerial shot from 1973 of the Holland Tunnel Rotary serving eastbound tube of tunnel; a fifth exit was added in 2004

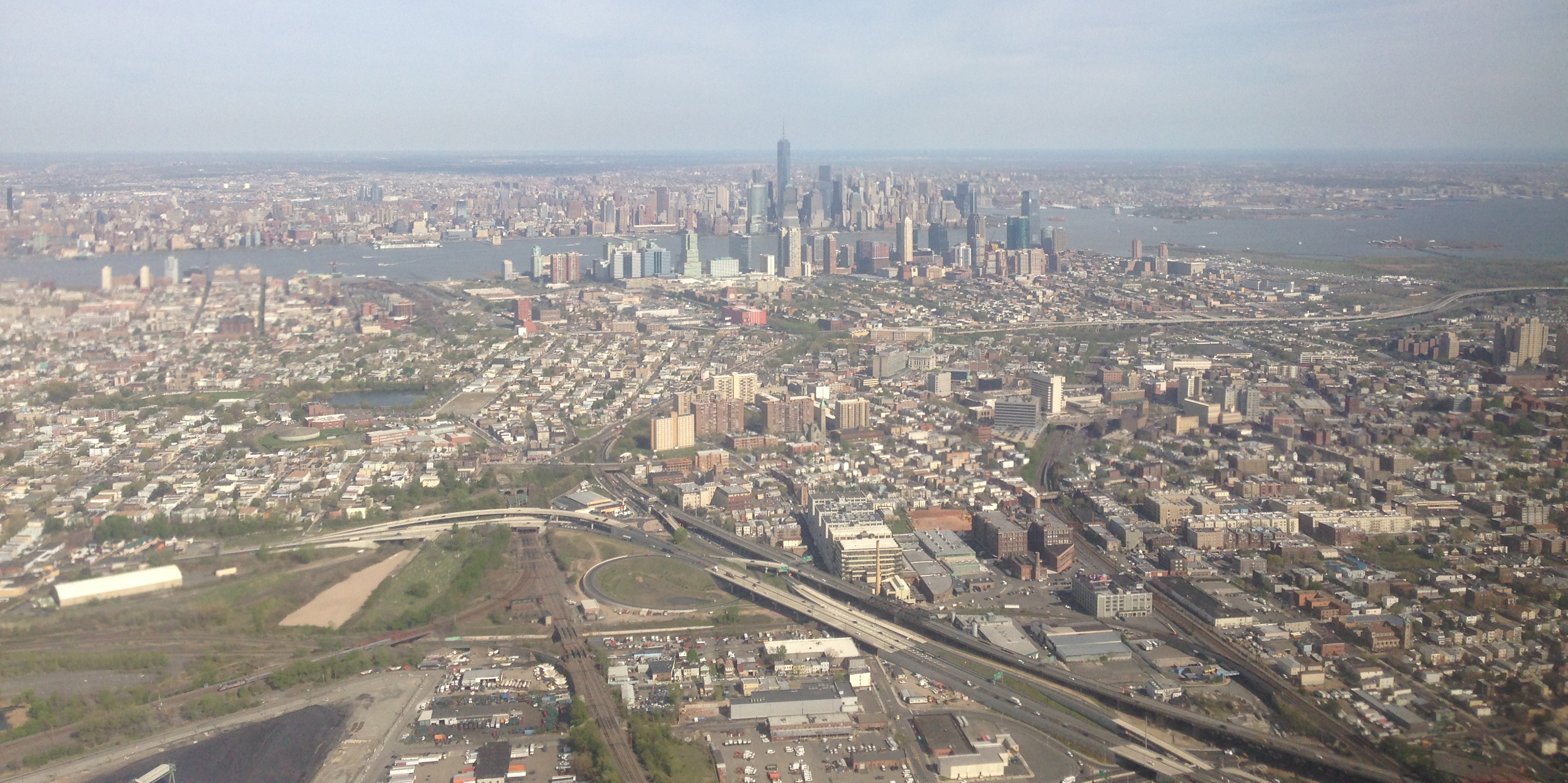
I-78 in New York and New Jersey

The section of I-78 within New York is 0.5 miles (0.80 km) long according to the Federal Highway Administration (FHWA), although the New York State Department of Transportation (NYSDOT) considers I-78 to be 0.9 miles (1.4 km) long. It consists exclusively of the Holland Tunnel, which connects to I-78 in New Jersey. The Holland Tunnel, a National Historic Landmark, was the world's longest underwater vehicular tunnel when it opened in 1927; it consists of two tubes, each of which carries two lanes of traffic in a single direction. The entrance plaza to the westbound tunnel, Freeman Plaza, is a rectangular block, bounded clockwise from the north by Broome, Varick, Watts, and Hudson streets. Four entrances feed into the tunnel from all corners of the block, including an entrance from Canal Street, which intersects Hudson and Watts streets at the southwest corner of the plaza. The westbound portal is located south of Dominick Street, just north of where the four entrances merge.

The exit plaza, referred to the "Holland Tunnel Rotary", is in a square superblock that previously housed the New York Central Railroad's St. John's Park Terminal, bounded clockwise from the north by Laight, Varick, Beach, and Hudson streets. Traffic leaves the tunnel at a portal at the southeast corner of Canal and Hudson streets, then heads southeast along the south line of Canal Street and south along the west line of Varick Street to the northeast corner of the plaza. From there, five exits, which are numbered sequentially, split from the rotary. One exit goes to each corner of the superblock. A fifth exit, added in 2004, splits to Varick Street on the superblock's eastern side. A pedestrian overpass crosses the entrance to the plaza and exit 5 at the northeast corner since the entrance from the tunnel cuts Laight Street.

There are four auxiliary routes of I-78 in New York; none of these spurs connect with I-78 because parts of I-78, I-278, and I-478 were not built. I-478 is currently the Brooklyn–Battery Tunnel and approaches, connecting I-278 in Brooklyn with the Battery in Manhattan. It was once planned to continue north along the unbuilt Westway to I-78 at the Holland Tunnel; however, this project was later canceled. I-278, the only I-78 spur to leave New York, has a western terminus in Linden, New Jersey, and passes northward and eastward through all five boroughs, with its eastern end at the Bruckner Interchange in the Bronx. (Note: I-278 passes through Randalls and Wards Islands, which is part of Manhattan (New York County). However, most of I-278's mileage is in the other four counties that make up New York City's five boroughs: Bronx, Queens, Kings (Brooklyn), and Richmond (Staten Island).) I-278 was planned to extend northwest to I-78 at Route 24 in Springfield Township, Union County, New Jersey. I-678 runs from JFK Airport in Queens north to the Bruckner Interchange. I-878, signed as part of NY 878, is a short east–west expressway crossing I-678 at JFK Airport, running only within Queens. It was originally planned as part of I-78, connecting to the Bushwick Expressway, I-278, the Williamsburg Bridge, and the Lower Manhattan Expressway. The original I-878 is now the segment of I-278 east of the split with NY 895; it connected I-278 with I-78, I-95, and I-678 at the Bruckner Interchange.

== History ==
=== Existing segment ===
When the Interstate numbering was finalized in the late 1950s, the Harrisburg–New York City route, I-78, was assigned to several proposed roads in New York City. It would leave the Holland Tunnel onto the Lower Manhattan Expressway, crossing the East River on the Williamsburg Bridge and following the Bushwick Expressway across Brooklyn to near Idlewild Airport (now JFK Airport). There it would follow the Nassau Expressway along the north boundary of the airport and turn north along the Clearview Expressway through Queens, crossing the East River again on the Throgs Neck Bridge into the Bronx. Finally, I-78 would split into two branches, one heading west along the Cross Bronx Expressway to the Bruckner Interchange and the other heading northwest along the Throgs Neck Expressway to the Bruckner Expressway near the south end of the New England Thruway. I-78 would also intersect with I-478 (Manhattan Bridge) in SoHo, Manhattan; I-278 (Brooklyn–Queens Expressway) in Williamsburg, Brooklyn; I-495 (Long Island Expressway) in Fresh Meadows, Queens; and I-95 (Cross Bronx and Bruckner Expressways), I-678 (Bronx–Whitestone Bridge), and I-878 (Bruckner Expressway) in Throggs Neck, the Bronx.

Only two sections of I-78 in Queens and the Bronx were built. When the Throgs Neck Bridge and its approaches opened in early 1961, they were signed as I-78. The lack of expressway names on the signs, as specified by federal standards, caused confusion among drivers who knew the highways by their names. The Clearview Expressway was completed to its present extent in mid-1963, and a short eastbound-only piece of the Nassau Expressway opened in 1971. The unbuilt sections of the Lower Manhattan, Bushwick, and Clearview expressways were canceled by the New York state government in March 1971.

The route of part of the Clearview Expressway's unbuilt southern section later became the JFK Expressway, which connects JFK Airport with the Nassau Expressway, Conduit Avenue (NY 27), and the Belt Parkway. The 2.5-mile (4.0 km) JFK Expressway was completed in 1991.

=== Canceled segments ===
The segments of I-78 and its auxiliaries in New York City and Nassau County that were built (black), canceled segments (dark red), and segments that were canceled with multiple different proposed routings (light red). Note that the canceled New Jersey segment of I-278 is not shown. In this map, I-78 extends across Lower Manhattan, then straddles the border of Brooklyn and Queens to JFK Airport, then north, partly along I-295, to I-95 in the Bronx. A spur in Greenpoint connected this route to the Queens–Midtown Tunnel.

==== Lower Manhattan Expressway ====
Lower Manhattan Expressway
- Location: New York County
- History: Proposed in 1941; approved in 1960; canceled in early 1971

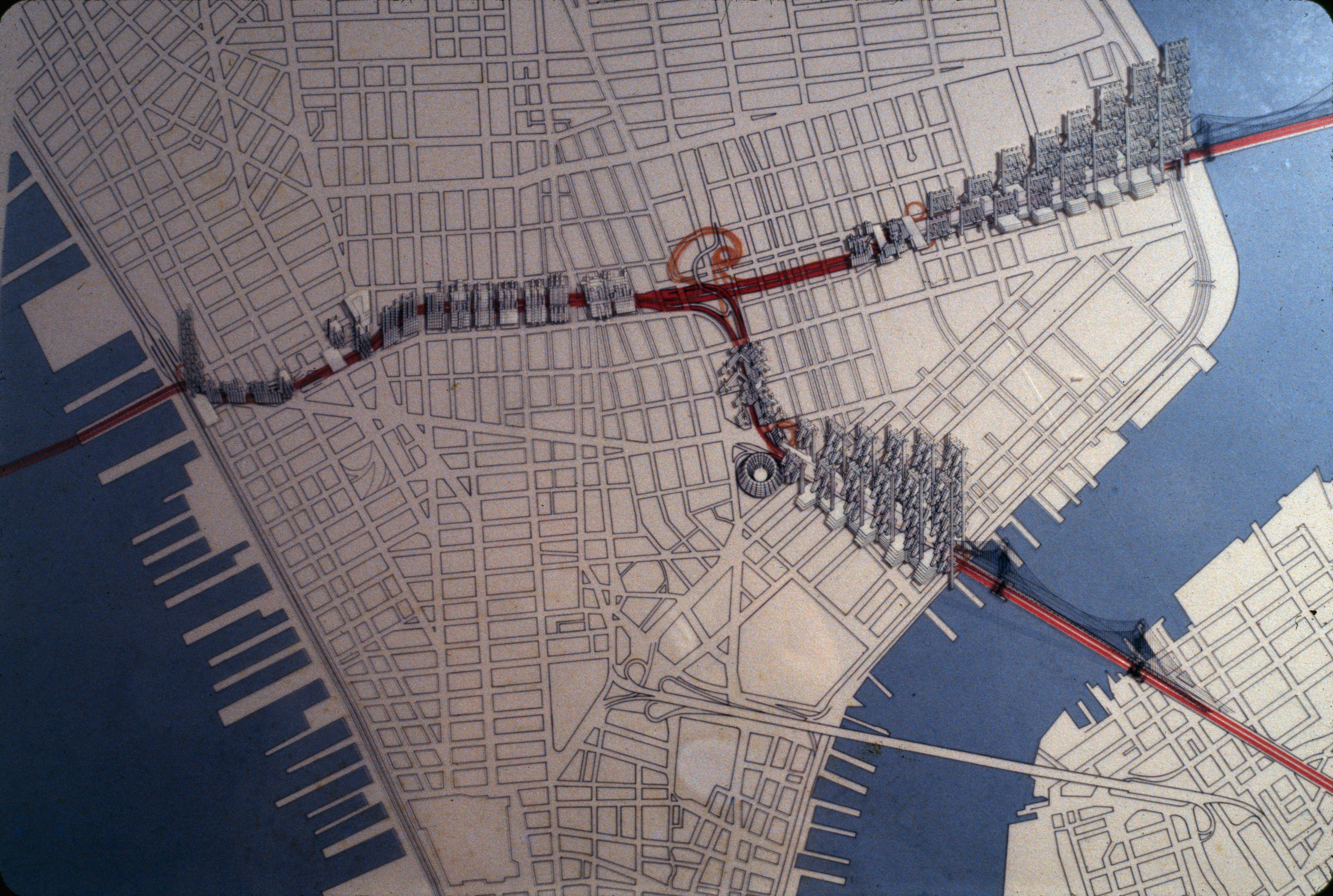
Map of Lower Manhattan with the LOMEX in red

The Lower Manhattan Expressway, also known as LOMEX or the Canal Street Expressway, was a controversial plan for an expressway through Lower Manhattan. The Lower Manhattan Expressway would have begun at the West Side Elevated Highway on the west side of Manhattan, where it would have merged with I-78 at the eastern portal of the Holland Tunnel. From here, the LOMEX would have proceeded generally southeastward as a 10-lane elevated highway, carrying I-78 over what became SoHo and Little Italy. At Centre Street, near the eastern edge of Little Italy, the highway would have split into two branches that both led to bridges over the East River on Manhattan's east side. The main branch would continue southeast as I-78 to the Williamsburg Bridge, while the other would head south to the Manhattan Bridge as I-478. The Manhattan Bridge Spur would have been located above Chrystie Street. The spur to the Williamsburg Bridge would have been mostly depressed or underground, running between Delancey and Broome streets and passing under the Chrystie Street Connection of the New York City Subway. As part of the project, a third tube to the Holland Tunnel would have been built to provide sufficient capacity for the proposed expressway traffic.

The expressway was originally conceived by urban planner and Triborough Bridge and Tunnel Authority (TBTA) chair Robert Moses in 1941. However, efforts to build the highway were delayed until November 1959, when Moses submitted the LOMEX plans for city approval. The New York City Planning Commission approved the expressway in February 1960, and the New York City Board of Estimate voted in favor of the expressway's routing that September. The cost of the plan approved by the Board of Estimate was $80 million (equivalent to $666 million in 2025) but later rose to $100 million (equivalent to $833 million in 2025). Estimates published in The New York Times in 1962 showed that the $100-million cost would have been covered by $90 million (equivalent to $749 million in 2025) from the federal government, $10 million (equivalent to $83.3 million in 2025) from the state of New York, and $220,000 (equivalent to $1.83 million in 2025) in city funds.

The expressway plan encountered logistical issues even before they had been fully approved. After the Planning Commission had approved the expressway proposal, the city moved to evict 2,000 families in 416 buildings along the expressway's route, as well as displace 804 businesses. However, residents started organizing protests against the relocation plan. In response, Mayor Robert F. Wagner Jr. told the affected residents that the timeline for starting construction had not yet been finalized, and so they would not need to move for some time. Opposition also formed over the fact that the highway would create a "Chinese wall" separating the neighborhoods of Lower Manhattan. Members of the affected communities, led by community activist Jane Jacobs, formed groups to protest against LOMEX. Jacobs chaired the Joint Committee to Stop the Lower Manhattan Expressway, which recruited such members as Margaret Mead, Eleanor Roosevelt, Lewis Mumford, Charles Abrams, and William H. Whyte. In his book about the dispute between Jacobs and Moses, the author Anthony Flint stated that newspapers such as The New York Times typically reported Moses's work favorably, while the newly created The Village Voice covered community rallies and advocated against the expressway. Jacobs continued to fight the expressway throughout the rest of the decade, and she was locally seen as a hero for her opposition to the project.

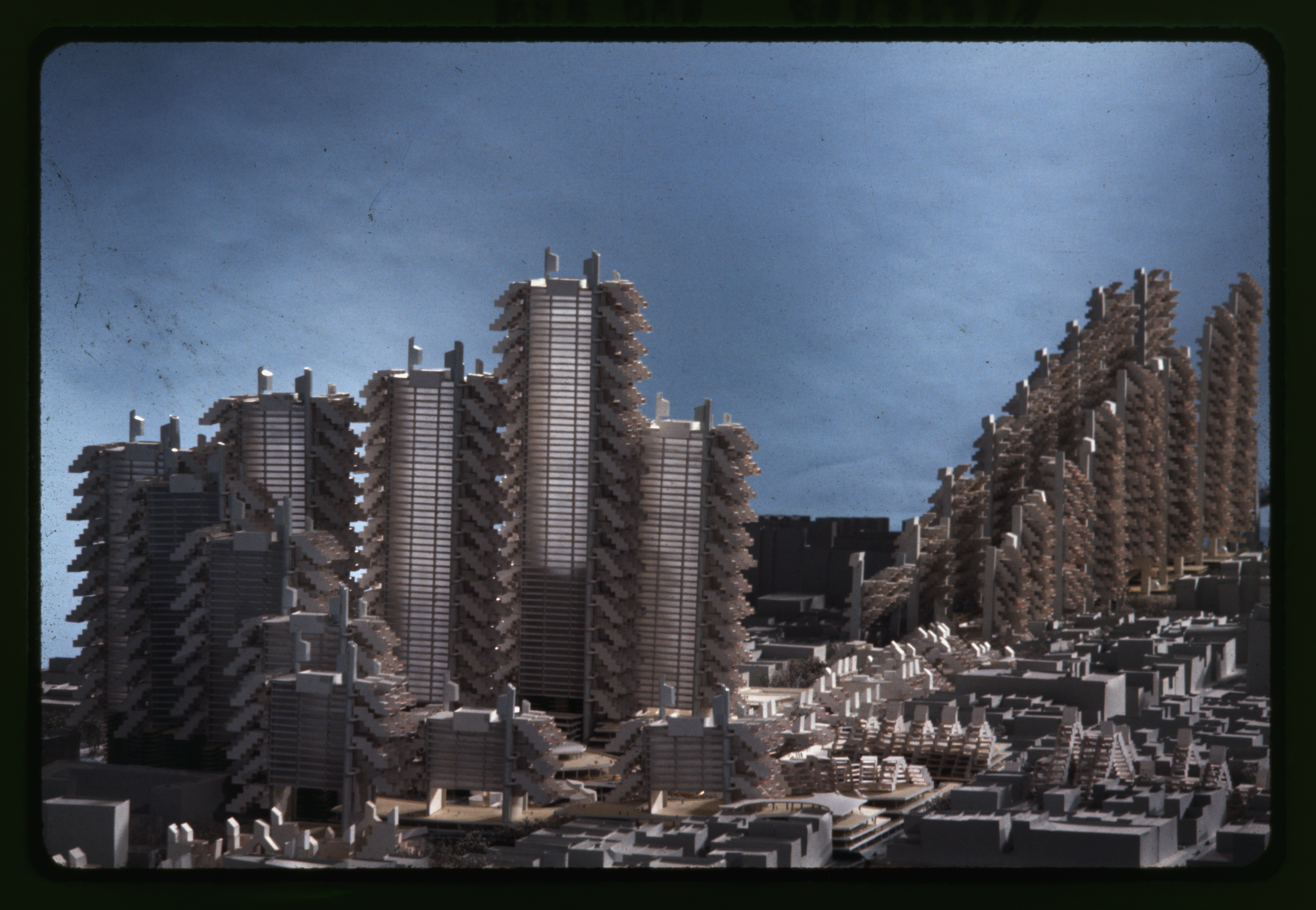
Model for the LOMEX as designed by Paul Rudolph

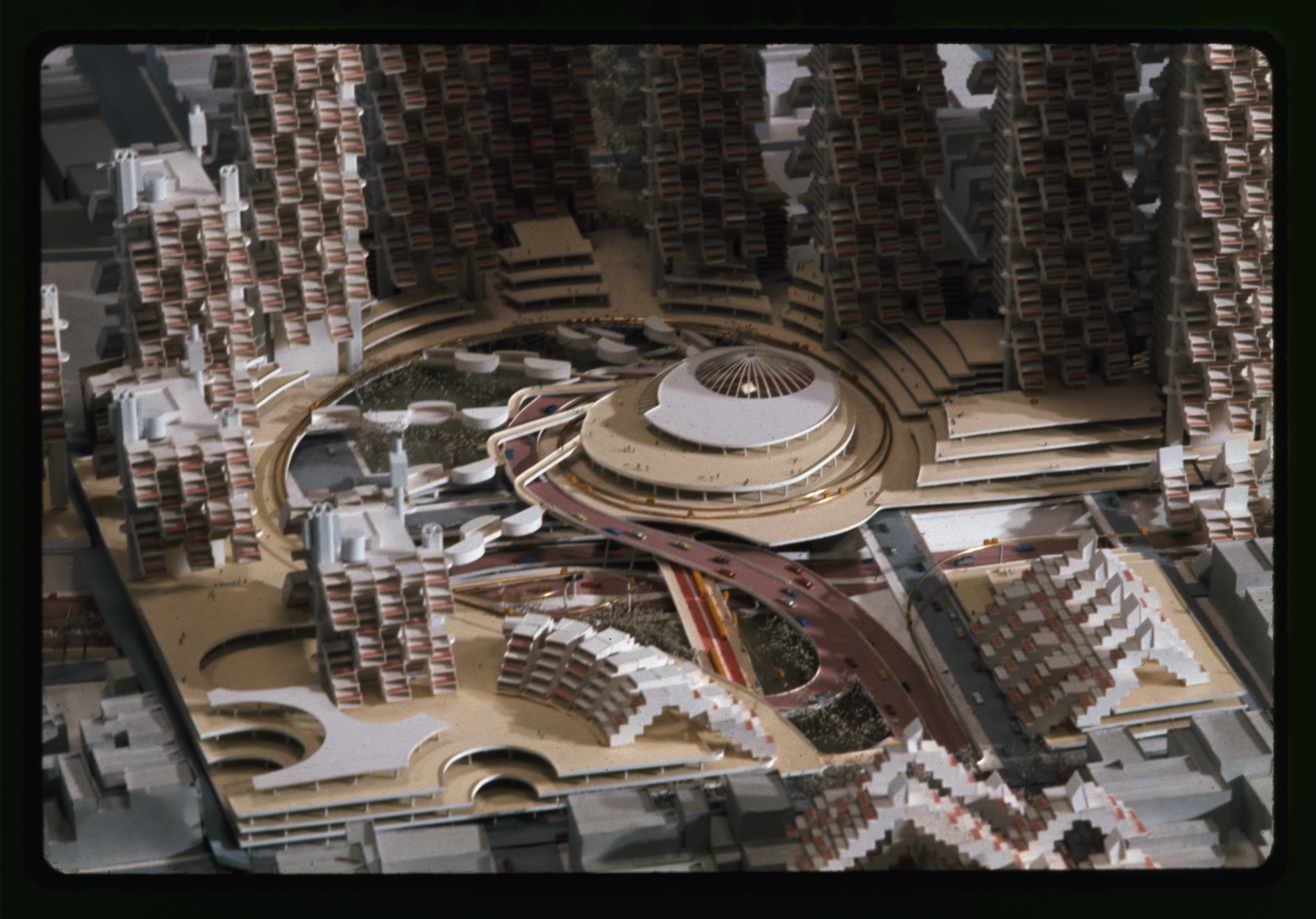
Chrystie Street transit hub

By 1961, Moses had initiated two large federal initiatives to demolish fourteen blocks along Broome Street in Little Italy and SoHo. Moses's plan, funded as "slum clearance" by Title I of the Housing Act of 1949, also called for multiple blocks to be razed and replaced with upscale highrises. The plan ultimately required 132 families to move out, as well as displaced 1,000 small businesses, who relocated to what is now Washington Square Village. In April 1962, Wagner commenced the acquisition of property for the Lower Manhattan Expressway. After further issues with relocation arose in August 1962, Wagner delayed final action on the proposal until after that year's November general elections. A report on the relocation process was published on December 3 of that year. The report stated that the 1,972 families could possibly be relocated without much difficulty. Two days later, there was a tumultuous six-hour-long special executive session of the New York City Board of Estimate on the second floor of New York City Hall, where city officials voted unanimously to block the planned expressway. This served only as a temporary deterrent against the expressway plans, and, in May 1963, Moses announced a revised proposal.

A short 156-foot (48 m) section of the Williamsburg Bridge spur directly under Chrystie Street, with its southern edge aligned with the northern sidewalk of Broome Street, was built during this time. In December 1960, the New York state government started tendering bids to construct this segment. The low bid of about $1.02 million (equivalent to $8.38 million in 2025) was accepted on January 26, 1961, and the road was completed by January 1964. This piece of the highway had cost $941,000 (equivalent to $7.46 million in 2025) to construct. It was necessitated because, in case the expressway was ever completed, the tunnel segment would provide structural support to the Chrystie Street Connection. Ultimately, this segment of tunnel was never used since the expressway was later canceled.

The argument over the Lower Manhattan Expressway became a pivotal argument in the 1965 New York City mayoral election. Mayor Wagner supported the construction of the expressway and wanted for the highway to be completed by 1971. His opponent, John Lindsay, objected to the elevated highway plan; in July 1965, he filed a lawsuit to postpone any decisions on the expressway until after the election that November. The Port Authority, which operated the Holland Tunnel, also opposed the proposed link because it would put congestion back onto the Holland Tunnel, which had seen moderate traffic flows for the first time since its 1927 opening. Lindsay ultimately won the election and immediately began looking to modify the project's routing. The Regional Plan Association suggested that the city build the expressway underground or in an open cut, instead of an elevated highway. However, Moses opposed the construction of a depressed highway since the same number of buildings would have to be demolished compared to an elevated highway. Deputy Mayor Robert Price subsequently announced that it had stopped pursuing the Lower Manhattan Expressway in any form; however, the Lindsay administration itself was still conducting studies on a possible underground routing. After considerable disagreement with the Lindsay administration, Moses was removed from his position as the city's arterial-road planner in July 1966. Lindsay also commissioned private consultants to perform a study on the Lower Manhattan Expressway, and, in November 1966, they concluded that the expressway plan was not the optimal solution for Lower Manhattan congestion.

In January 1967, Lindsay and Governor Nelson Rockefeller agreed to commission a study of the feasibility of an underground highway rather than an elevated highway. The engineering study was completed that March; it called for various sections to be built in tunnels and open cuts under Broome and Chrystie streets, with a short section west of Sixth Avenue on an elevated structure. The underground highway would have to pass underneath existing subway lines before rising on elevated ramps to connect with the Manhattan Bridge. There would only be two exits, located at the Manhattan Bridge and at Sixth Avenue; the Williamsburg Bridge spur had been dropped by this point. The plan failed to placate Lower Manhattan residents who had opposed the first two proposals since they had been promised that the entire highway would be located underground. Despite the persistent opposition, the federal and state governments allocated funding for the expressway in September 1967. Lindsay announced in April 1968 that he wanted to start construction on the updated Lower Manhattan Expressway as soon as possible. However, the tunnel proposal also encountered difficulties: in January 1969, a group of scientists stated that carbon monoxide levels around the tunnel would be dangerously high, and, the next month, several officials succeeded in delaying the expressway plans.

==== Bushwick Expressway ====
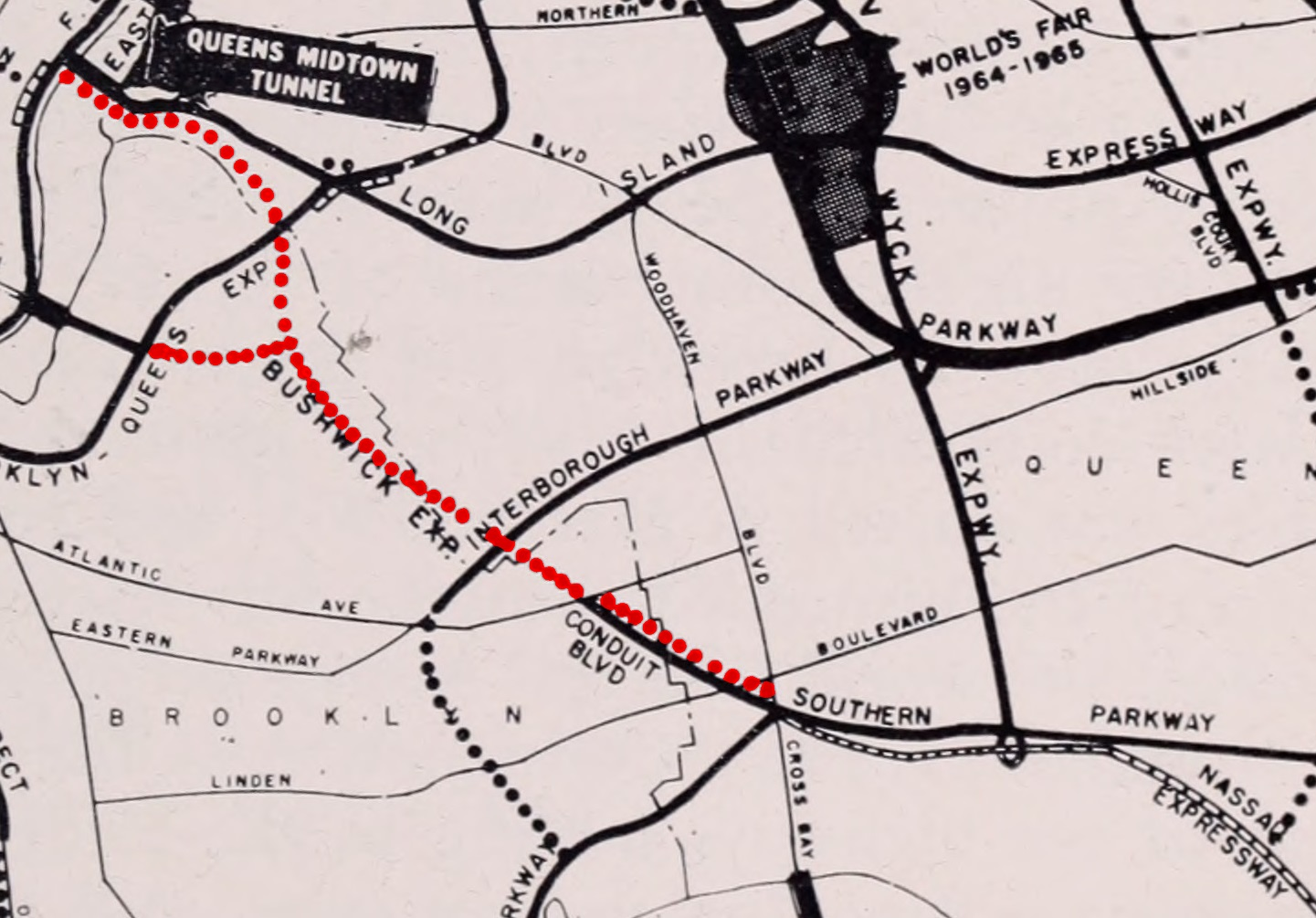
A 1964 highway map with the proposed Bushwick Expressway highlighted in red

Although the Lower Manhattan Expressway caused the most controversy, the first I-78 segment to be canceled was the Bushwick Expressway, which would have linked the Williamsburg Bridge to the Nassau Expressway. The original route would have utilized Broadway, Bushwick Avenue, and the Conduit Boulevard/Avenue corridor. An alternate routing, proposed by the TBTA in the 1960s, would have traveled slightly farther north along Broadway, Flushing Avenue, or Meserole Street and Montrose Avenue, and Wyckoff Avenue, parallel to the Brooklyn–Queens border. This was the right-of-way of the Long Island Rail Road (LIRR)'s defunct Evergreen Branch. The Bushwick Expressway would then run east along Force Tube Avenue and Conduit Avenue to the Nassau Expressway. Under this plan, an additional spur would have branched off at approximately Wyckoff and Flushing Avenues and run northwest along Vandervoort Avenue parallel to Newtown Creek. It would have crossed the creek into Long Island City and traveled west along either the Long Island Expressway or the LIRR Montauk Branch in order to connect with the Queens–Midtown Tunnel, for which a third tube would have been constructed. The highway would have cut through the Williamsburg, Bushwick, and East New York neighborhoods of Brooklyn. The 1960s routing would have also bisected Greenpoint, Highland Park, the Cemetery of the Evergreens and Ridgewood, Queens. The East New York segment was partially constructed from Atlantic Avenue to the Belt Parkway in the early 1940s, when Conduit Boulevard/Avenue was widened. The current grass median of the boulevard would have facilitated the expressway.

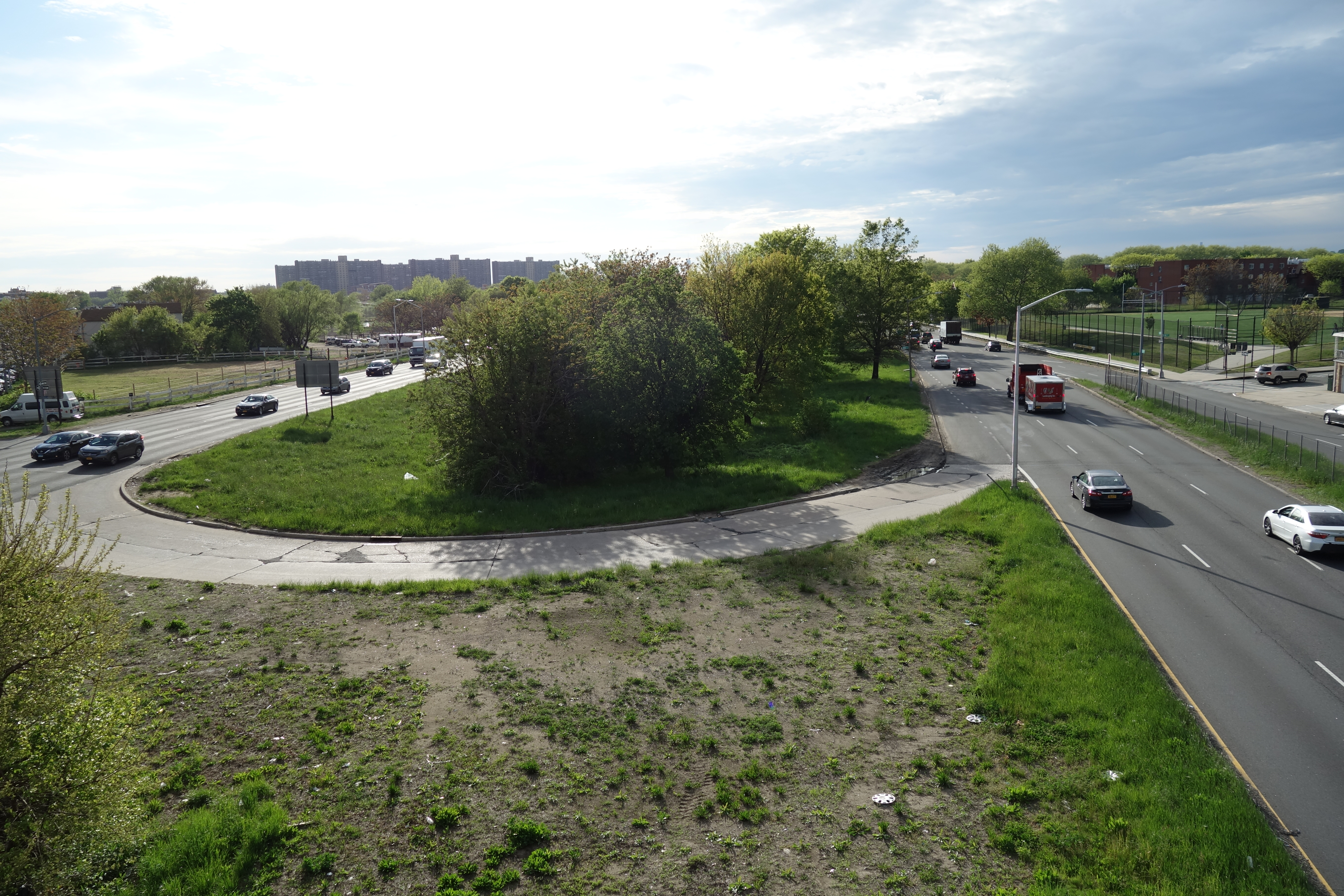
The median of Conduit Avenue (pictured) would have been used for the Bushwick Expressway.

The Bushwick Expressway was proposed around 1954 and included in the Port Authority's Joint Study of Arterial Facilities in 1955. The Wyckoff Avenue route was proposed in the 1960s. At this time, the TBTA envisioned the main route as an eight-lane highway, while the Williamsburg Bridge and Midtown Tunnel spurs would support six lanes of traffic. As with LOMEX, residents along the Bushwick Expressway's route opposed the project because it would necessitate the destruction of residences and businesses in Brooklyn and Queens; the TBTA estimated that nearly 4,000 families would be displaced by the expressway. At the urging of Mayor John Lindsay, the Cross Brooklyn Expressway, which would connect to the Verrazzano–Narrows Bridge and not provide a link in I-78, was substituted for the Bushwick Expressway in 1967 in order to reduce traffic into Manhattan and because it would reduce the displacement of residents and businesses.

==== Cancelation of all I-78 expressways ====
While campaigning for reelection in 1969, Mayor Lindsay canceled plans for the Lower Manhattan and Cross Brooklyn expressways, citing lack of community support. Lindsay declared the Lower Manhattan Expressway to be "dead for all time", and the Board of Estimate officially voted to erase the proposed expressway from city maps in August. All three unbuilt expressways along the path of I-78 were deleted at the state level by Governor Rockefeller in March 1971.

Effective January 1, 1970, NYSDOT truncated the east end of I-78 to the east end of the Williamsburg Bridge at I-278 in Brooklyn. The Clearview and Throgs Neck expressways, as well as the eastern part of the Cross Bronx Expressway, became I-295, and the Nassau Expressway became I-878 (now signed as NY 878), though it was still shown as I-78 on maps through the late 1970s. I-878 was also assigned to the unbuilt Cross Brooklyn Expressway, for a total of 15.6 miles (25.1 km) between the Verrazzano–Narrows Bridge and JFK Airport. I-878, the Nassau Expressway, was redesignated as a New York state route by 1991.

Robert Moses had planned to build three other expressways through Manhattan, two of which were never constructed as planned. The Mid-Manhattan Expressway would have been an elevated or underground highway along 30th Street connecting the Lincoln Tunnel with the Queens-Midtown Tunnel. The Cross Harlem Expressway would have run at ground level at 125th Street. The Trans-Manhattan Expressway, the only one of Moses's planned Manhattan expressways to be constructed, connected the George Washington Bridge with Moses's Cross Bronx Expressway and was completed in 1962. The I-478 designation was later reassigned to the Brooklyn–Battery Tunnel. This was part of a plan for another elevated highway called the Westway, which would have connected the Brooklyn–Battery, Holland, and Lincoln tunnels. The Westway project was officially abandoned in 1985 also due to community opposition.

A 2015 Gothamist article cites singer Bob Dylan as being partially responsible for the eventual cancelation of the Lower Manhattan Expressway. In 1963, Dylan was said to have written a song called "Listen, Robert Moses" that protested Moses's plans for a superhighway. Though experts were skeptical about the existence of the song and the New York Public Library does not have any records containing the song, Jane Jacobs's son, Jim, confirmed that Dylan had written it and a copy of the lyrics was found in the Tuli Kupferberg collection of the Fales Library of New York University.

== Exit list ==
The New York section of I-78 only consists of the Holland Tunnel and its entrance and exit ramps. There are five eastbound exit ramps, which are numbered sequentially as traffic heads counterclockwise around the tunnel's exit plaza. The westbound entrance plaza is several blocks to the north and has direct entrances from Hudson, Canal, Watts, and Varick Streets.

The entire route is in the New York City borough of Manhattan.

Location	mi	km	Exit	Destinations	Notes
Hudson River	0.0	0.0	–	I-78 west (Route 139 west) – New Jersey	Continuation into Jersey City, New Jersey at the river's center
Hudson River	0.0	0.0	Holland Tunnel (eastbound toll in New Jersey)		
Tribeca	0.90	1.45	1	NY 9A (West Street)	Access via Laight Street west
Tribeca	0.99	1.59	2	Uptown – Hudson Street	
Tribeca	1.05	1.69	3	Brooklyn	Access via Beach Street east
Tribeca	1.05	1.69	4	Downtown	Access via Varick Street south
Tribeca	1.15	1.85	5	Canal Street east	At-grade intersection with Varick Street (no turns allowed); continues via Laight Street
1.000 mi = 1.609 km; 1.000 km = 0.621 mi: Electronic toll collection

== See also ==
- Freeway and expressway revolts

== Notes ==
Interstate 78
Previous state: New Jersey	New York	Next state: Terminus
