= JFK Expressway =

Highway in Queens, New York

Coordinates: 40.659437°N 73.792313°W

- JFK Expressway highlighted in red

Route information
- Maintained by PANYNJ
- Length: 2.5 mi (4.0 km)
- Existed: 1986–present

Major junctions
- South end: John F. Kennedy Airport
- North end: NY 27 / NY 878 / Belt Parkway in Springfield Gardens

Location
- Country: United States
- State: New York
- Counties: Queens

Highway system
- New York Highways; Interstate; US; State; Reference; Parkways

The JFK Expressway is a freeway connecting the Belt Parkway with John F. Kennedy International Airport in Queens, New York City. It interchanges with the Nassau Expressway (New York State Route 878) near the originally proposed southern terminus of the Clearview Expressway (Interstate 295). The highway is the newest expressway in New York City, with the final section having been completed in December 1991.

== Route description ==
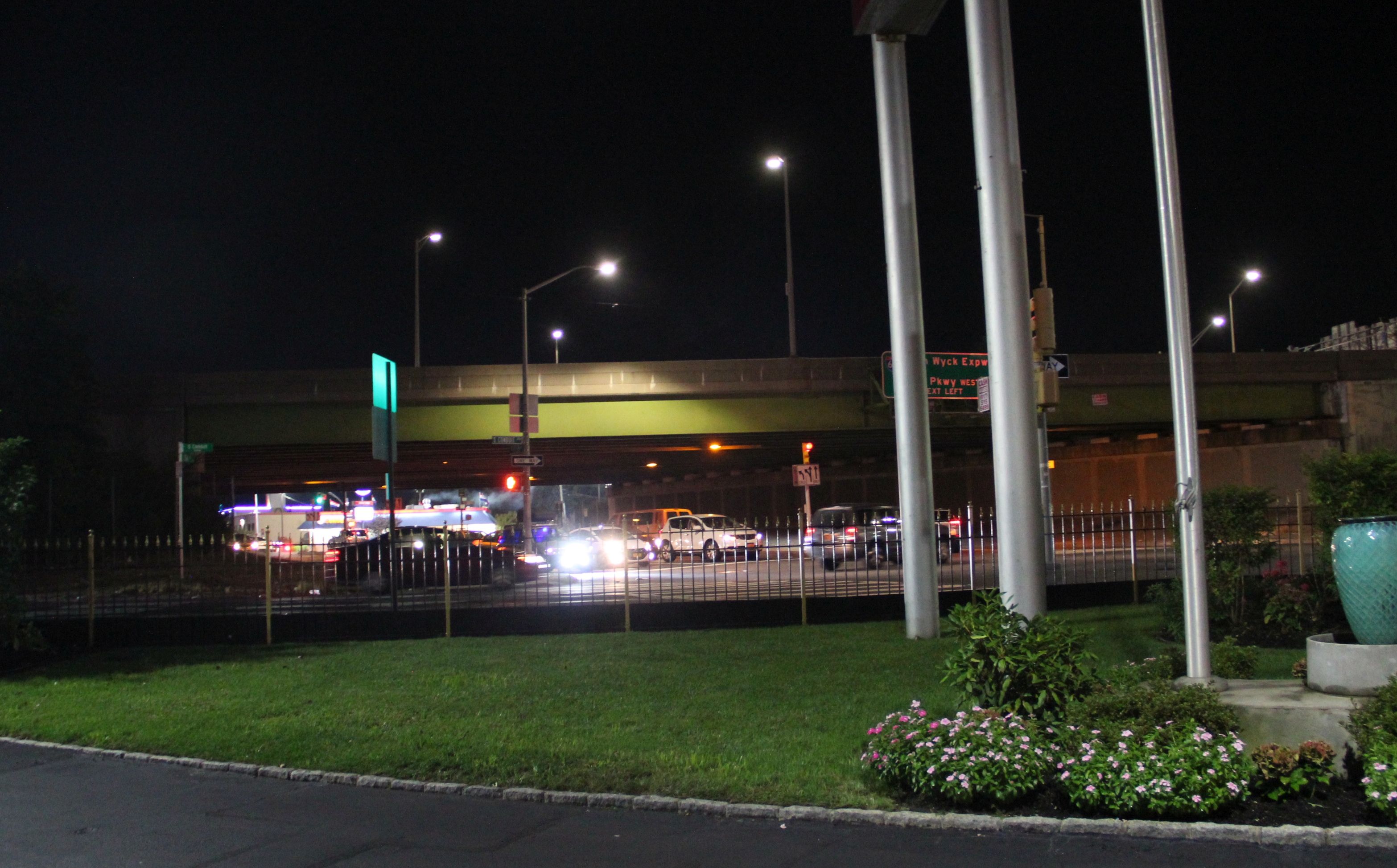
JFK Expressway crosses over Rockaway Boulevard

The JFK Expressway begins on the grounds of John F. Kennedy International Airport in Queens, New York City. The road has southbound ramps that provide access to Terminal 1, Terminal 4, and Terminals 5 through 7 – along with the parking areas for Terminals 4 and 5. The northbound direction has access from all these points. The northbound direction has an exit that provides access to Interstate 678 (the Van Wyck Expressway) that also provides access to long-term parking, rental car returns, as well as return access to the terminals. There is also a southbound entrance from I-678. North of here, the road continues north as a four-lane freeway, with a southbound exit and northbound entrance to Terminal 8. In the area, the road passes under the AirTrain JFK people mover that serves the airport. The JFK Expressway passes under airport taxiways in a tunnel as a six-lane road and comes to an interchange with South Cargo Road, which provides access to Cargo Areas, Medical Building, Vetport, Airport Services, as well as a return route to the terminals.

The road turns to the north again and interchanges with 150th Street, with access to Long Term Parking, Rental Car Returns, and General Aviation. This interchange has no northbound exit, with the South Cargo Road interchange serving as the northbound exit. The JFK Expressway then reaches the Kennedy Airport Interchange, where it connects to NY 878 (Nassau Expressway) with a northbound exit to the eastbound direction (which provides access to Rockaway Boulevard) and a northbound exit and entrance in both directions to the westbound direction, which also provides access to I-678 and the westbound Belt Parkway. The expressway has a northbound exit and southbound entrance with eastbound NY 27 (South Conduit Avenue) before merging into the eastbound direction of the Belt Parkway.

Along the southbound lanes of the JFK Expressway just south of the junction with NY 27, there is an incomplete "stub" ramp that was to lead to the westbound lanes of NY 878, which were supposed to be built as far as Cross Bay Boulevard. The $80 million extension was cancelled in 1995.

The JFK Expressway, lying almost exclusively within JFK Airport, is maintained by the airport's operator, the Port Authority of New York and New Jersey (PANYNJ) – along with the portions of the Van Wyck Expressway on airport grounds and all other airport roadways.

== History ==
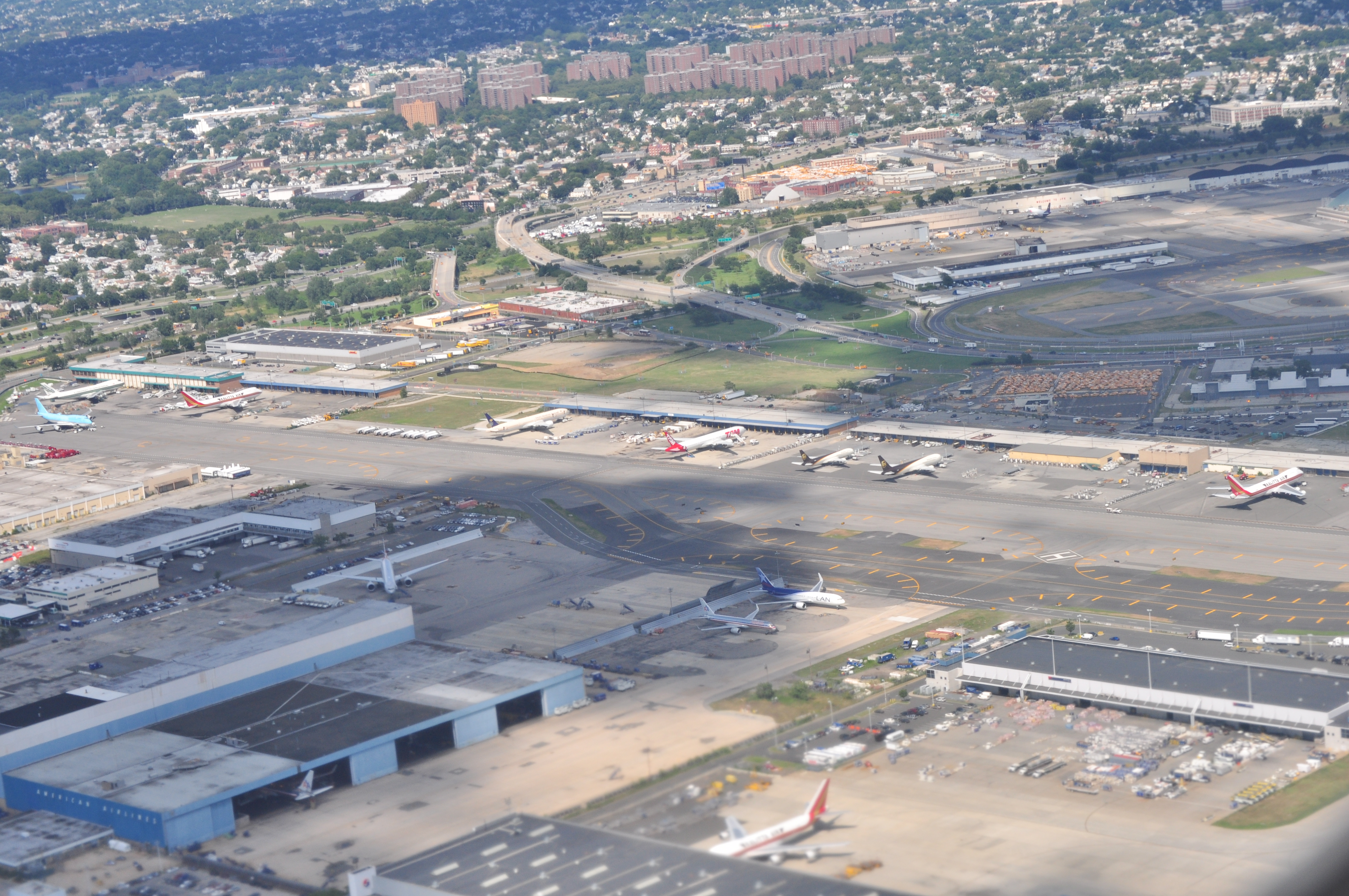
The JFK Expressway, as seen from the air.

The JFK Expressway was built as part of a costly overhaul of Kennedy Airport that began in the late 1980s. The highway was provisionally referred to as the 150th Street Airport Expressway or 150th Street Expressway, after the street it was replacing.

Prior to the construction of the JFK Expressway, the right-of-way was occupied by Cornell Creek, which flowed through Beaver Pond and Baisley Pond into Jamaica Bay. 150th Street, originally Three Mile Mill Road, was later laid out along the banks of the creek. The construction of JFK Airport made the creek subterranean, depressed underground.

The Van Wyck Expressway (Interstate 678) was first opened in 1950, connecting the airport to the Grand Central Parkway, and later extended north to the Whitestone Expressway. At the time, it was the only expressway connected to the airport. Consequently, traffic jams often backed up the expressway for several miles north. This prompted the need for an additional expressway route directly serving the airport.

What is now the JFK Expressway was first proposed in the 1960s by the Port Authority, as a second short highway on the east side of the airport. The new expressway would have connected to a southern extension of the Clearview Expressway (today's Interstate 295), providing a second north–south expressway route to the airport and connecting to the Throgs Neck Bridge. The connection to the Clearview would have been direct as a single expressway, or indirect and connected by the Nassau Expressway, depending on the routing of the Clearview Extension. The existing portion of Clearview Expressway was completed in 1963 as part of Interstate 78. Due to a freeway revolt, it was only completed as far south as Hillside Avenue (NY 25); the expressway was to continue south from Hillside Avenue to NY 27 (Conduit Avenue) to the Nassau Expressway in Laurelton, with Interstate 78 proceeding west across Queens, Brooklyn, and Manhattan to the Holland Tunnel. The section of Clearview Expressway between Conduit and Hillside Avenues was deemed too disruptive to the surrounding neighborhoods. It, and the rest of I-78 between the Holland Tunnel and the existing Clearview spur were cancelled by Governor Nelson Rockefeller in March 1971.

The first portion of the JFK Expressway to open was the junction with the Nassau Expressway and 150th Street, the second major entrance to the airport, which was completed around 1986. In 1991, the JFK Expressway was completed.

== Exit list ==
The entire route is in the New York City borough of Queens.

| Location | mi | km | Exit | Destinations | Notes |
|---|---|---|---|---|---|
| JFK Airport | 0.00 | 0.00 | – | Terminals 1–3; Terminal 4 Parking, Terminals 5–7, Terminal 5 Parking | Southern terminus |
| JFK Airport | 0.10 | 0.16 | – | Terminal 4 | Southbound exit and northbound entrance |
| JFK Airport | 0.20 | 0.32 | – | I-678 north (Van Wyck Expressway) – Long Term Parking, Rental Car Return | Northbound exit and southbound entrance; southern terminus of I-678 |
| JFK Airport | 0.40 | 0.64 | – | Terminal 8 | Southbound exit and northbound entrance |
| JFK Airport | 0.90 | 1.45 | C | South Cargo Road – Cargo Areas, Rental Car Return, Long Term Parking | |
| JFK Airport | 1.30 | 2.09 | B | Long Term Parking, Cell Phone Lot, Rental Car Returns, Cargo Areas | No northbound exit |
| Springfield Gardens | 1.50 | 2.41 | A | To I-678 / Belt Parkway west / Rockaway Boulevard east | Access via NY 878; no southbound exit |
| Springfield Gardens | 2.30 | 3.70 | – | NY 27 east (South Conduit Avenue) | Northbound exit and southbound entrance; all trucks must exit |
| Springfield Gardens | 2.50 | 4.02 | – | Belt Parkway east – Eastern Long Island | Northern terminus; exit 20 on Belt Parkway |
1.000 mi = 1.609 km; 1.000 km = 0.621 mi: Incomplete access
