= New York State Route 878 =

Highway on Long Island, New York

New York State Route 878
- Nassau Expressway
- Map of western Long Island with NY 878 highlighted in red

Route information
- Maintained by NYSDOT and NYCDOT
- Length: 5.69 mi (9.16 km)
- History: Queens segment designated I-878 on January 1, 1970; Queens eastbound freeway completed by 1971; Nassau segment opened 1990; Queens segment redesignated NY 878 by 1991

Northern segment
- Length: 3.73 mi (6.00 km)
- West end: NY 27 in Ozone Park
- Major intersections: I-678 / Belt Parkway in South Ozone Park
- East end: Rockaway Boulevard in Springfield Gardens

Southern segment
- Length: 1.96 mi (3.15 km)
- North end: Nassau Expressway / Burnside Avenue in Inwood
- South end: Atlantic Beach Bridge in Lawrence

Location
- Country: United States
- State: New York
- Counties: Queens, Nassau

Highway system
- New York Highways; Interstate; US; State; Reference; Parkways
← NY 840	→ I-890

New York State Route 878 (NY 878) is an expressway on Long Island in New York state. The route exists in two sections, which both form the Nassau Expressway. NY 878's western terminus is the Belt Parkway and Conduit Avenue (NY 27) in Ozone Park, within southern Queens in New York City. Its southern terminus is at the Atlantic Beach Bridge in Lawrence, within southwestern Nassau County. NY 878 is discontinuous between Farmers Boulevard in Queens and the town of Inwood in Nassau County. The two sections are connected to each other by Rockaway Boulevard and Rockaway Turnpike.

NY 878 is maintained in part by the New York City Department of Transportation (NYCDOT); the New York State Department of Transportation (NYSDOT); and the government of Nassau County. The NYSDOT also maintains part of Rockaway Boulevard, which is designated as the reference route NY 909G. The 0.70 miles (1.13 km) of NY 878 between I-678 and the JFK Expressway is officially designated Interstate 878 (I-878), but not signed as such. This segment is instead signed as NY 878. The NYSDOT designated the eastbound lanes of the freeway as I-878 in January 1970, but the entire Nassau Expressway was publicly re-designated as NY 878 by 1991. The unsigned Interstate 878 is the shortest Interstate Highway in the United States.

I-878, the Nassau Expressway, was originally planned in 1945 as a freeway between the Belt Parkway in Queens and Long Beach in Nassau. The expressway was supposed to replace Rockaway Boulevard and Turnpike in the vicinity of what is now JFK Airport, connecting to a proposed Long Beach Expressway south of Atlantic Beach Bridge. On the west side, I-878 was supposed to connect to I-278 near the Bay Ridge Area as the Cross-Brooklyn Expressway, having a major interchange. The short freeway portion in Queens was originally built as part of Interstate 78 (I-78) in the late 1960s, but the segment of I-78 through New York City was canceled in March 1971 due to community opposition. Through the 1970s, the rest of the freeway south of 150th Street was also canceled for various reasons. A scaled-down version of the road in Nassau County, a four-lane expressway, was completed in 1990. An attempt to complete the section of the freeway in Queens was deferred due to the early 1990s economic recession.

== Route description ==
=== Northern segment ===
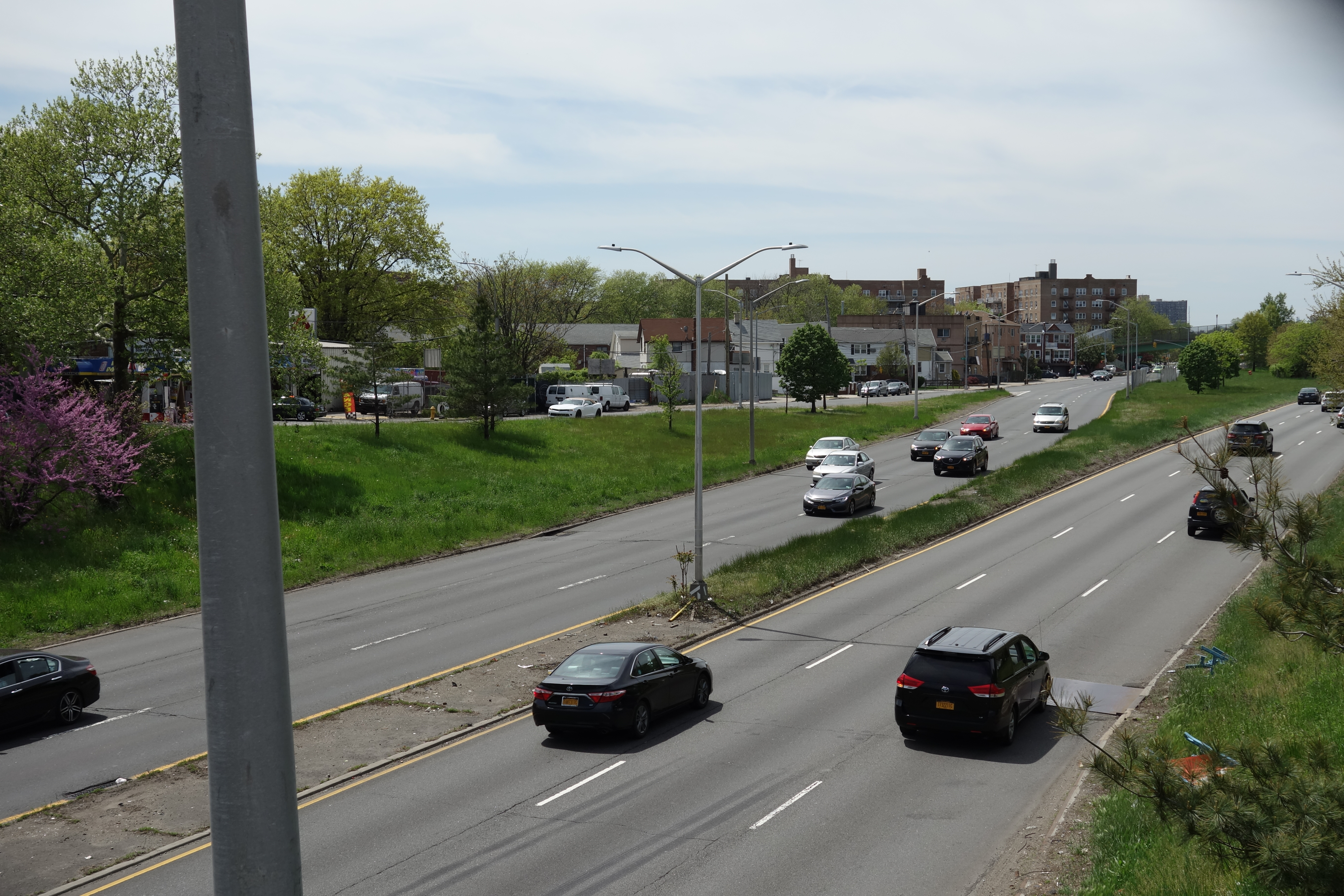
Looking westward at the beginning of the eastbound Nassau Expressway at Cross Bay Boulevard, concurrent with NY 27.

The 3.73-mile (6.00 km) northwest section in Queens is mostly built to freeway standards, except for a traffic light at the eastern end of the highway. It lies along the north edge of JFK Airport, just south of the Belt Parkway and Conduit Avenue (NY 27). Officially NY 878 starts at the interchange between the Belt Parkway, Conduit Avenue (NY 27) and Cross Bay Boulevard, and it stretches east to the intersection of Rockaway and Farmers Boulevards. The eastbound freeway does begin in the median of Conduit Avenue just west of Cross Bay Boulevard, but it carries NY 27 until the highways split at a point between the IND Rockaway Line underpass and Lefferts Boulevard. The separate NY 878 begins at that split, but the route only carries eastbound one-way traffic until it reaches the junction with I-678 (Van Wyck Expressway). There it becomes a two-way freeway. NY 878 continues east past the JFK Expressway, and becomes an expressway at a traffic light at North Hangar Road. NY 878 ends soon after at Rockaway Boulevard and Farmers Boulevard.

==== Interstate 878 ====
Interstate 878
- Location: South Ozone Park, Queens
- Length: 0.70 mi (1,130 m)

The 0.70-mile (1.13 km) stretch from I-678 (Van Wyck Expressway) east to the JFK Expressway is designated but not signed as I-878 by the Federal Highway Administration. This makes I-878 the shortest three-digit Interstate Route and the shortest Interstate Highway in the Interstate Highway System. This section of NY 878 only has route designations for the eastbound lanes. The New York State Department of Transportation (NYSDOT) designates I-878 as the stretch of NY 878 from the Van Wyck Expressway east to the 150th Street underpass. The entire segment, including the unsigned I-878, is maintained by the NYSDOT.

Rockaway Boulevard in Queens, as well as Rockaway Turnpike in Nassau County, connect the two halves of NY 878. From the end of NY 878 to near Guy R. Brewer Boulevard, the road is maintained by the New York City Department of Transportation (NYCDOT). From Guy R. Brewer Boulevard to just before the city line, the road is designated as the unsigned state reference route NY 909G. The last 0.07 miles (110 m) before the city border are city-maintained. The part of Rockaway Turnpike that connects to NY 878 is maintained by Nassau County.

=== Southern segment ===
The 2.40-mile (3.86 km) southeast section of NY 878 is an at-grade expressway, with only two bridges grade-separating the highway from intersecting routes – over the Far Rockaway Branch of the Long Island Rail Road, and under Seagirt Boulevard at a trumpet interchange. Signage for NY 878 can be seen from the split with Rockaway Turnpike south to the toll plaza of the Atlantic Beach Bridge in Lawrence. However, the NYSDOT only considers a 1.96-mile (3.15 km) piece of the highway to be part of NY 878. The state-maintained portion of NY 878 comprises the segment south of Burnside Avenue in Inwood. The segment from Rockaway Turnpike to Burnside Avenue is maintained by the Nassau County The southern section of NY 878 has no connections to other state routes.

== History ==
=== Predecessors and planning ===
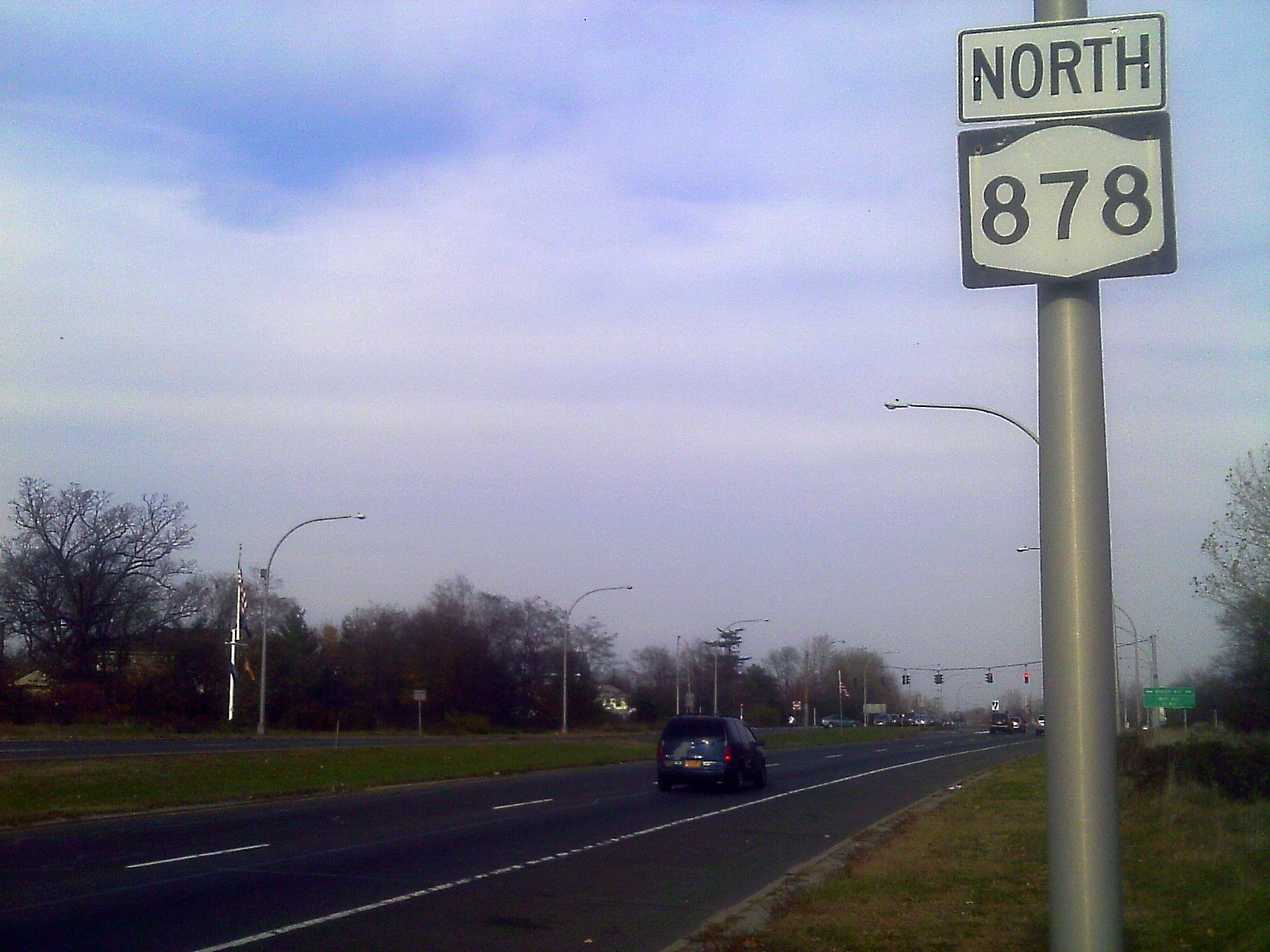
Heading north from the Atlantic Beach Bridge on NY 878 in Nassau County

The segments of I-78 and its auxiliaries in NYC and Nassau County that were built (black), cancelled segments (dark red), and segments that were cancelled with multiple different proposed routings (light red). In this map, I-878 extends from I-278, extends south across Brooklyn and Queens, and terminates at Atlantic Beach

The portion of Rockaway Boulevard and Turnpike between NY 27 and the Atlantic Beach Bridge was originally designated as New York State Route 104 by 1931. However, this designation was removed by 1932.

The expressway was first proposed in late 1945, to connect Brooklyn with southeastern Queens and the South Shore of Long Island, as well as to provide a link to Idlewild (now JFK) Airport. It was among several highways planned jointly between Robert Moses' Triborough Bridge and Tunnel Authority (TBTA), and the Port Authority of New York and New Jersey. By 1949, the Nassau Expressway was planned along with a replacement for the original Atlantic Beach Bridge. It was envisioned by Moses and Nassau County executive J. Russell Sprague as a vital link between Atlantic Beach, the Belt Parkway system, and the Bronx–Whitestone Bridge. A contract for preliminary engineering work was awarded that year. As originally proposed, the highway would have only extended from the interchange with Van Wyck Expressway and Belt Parkway to the Atlantic Beach Bridge.

In the beginning, the Nassau Expressway was supposed to be a single highway, with the now-separate spurs to be connected by a highway running parallel to Rockaway Boulevard and Rockaway Turnpike. The connector highway would have passed through the wetlands of Idlewild and Hook Creek (part of which would have been relocated to accommodate the highway), then turned south through the small community of Meadowmere, Queens, located near Five Towns. This route was favored as a replacement to Rockaway Boulevard/Turnpike, which was viewed as inadequate and congested. A map of the expressway was presented to the Nassau residents in 1951. Three years later, the state made the first land acquisitions for the Nassau segment of the expressway.

The Nassau Expressway was proposed alongside the never-built Long Beach Expressway. The Long Beach Expressway would have extended east past the Atlantic Beach Bridge along the South Shore to Long Beach and Lido Beach, ending at a junction with the Loop Parkway leading to Jones Beach and the Meadowbrook State Parkway. The Long Beach Expressway would have been a six-lane expressway, running along Reynolds Channel on the north shore of the Long Beach Barrier Island to New York Avenue, then along Park Avenue, which was the primary commercial thoroughfare of Long Beach.

The Nassau Expressway was mapped as part of the Interstate Highway System in 1961. At that point, the New York State Department of Public Works began purchasing land for both the Nassau and Long Beach Expressways. Over 65 acres (26 ha) of land were ceded from Idlewild Park near JFK Airport for the construction of the expressway. The small community of Meyers Harbor, located in the Hook Creek wetlands east of the modern Five Towns Shopping Center, was condemned and destroyed to provide a path for the expressway. Many homes in Inwood were either condemned and demolished or relocated in order to facilitate the expressway. However, Long Beach residents opposed the proposed expressway's routing along Park Avenue, as the residents believed the highway would create a "Chinese Wall" dividing their community. The Long Beach Expressway was vetoed by the state in 1967 due to community opposition.

=== Construction and delays ===
The first section of the Nassau Expressway to be built was a 2.8-mile-long (4.5 km) eastbound-only segment between Cross Bay Boulevard and 150th Street. The eastbound lanes ended at a point near JFK Expressway. The Nassau Expressway intersected with the Van Wyck Expressway at JFK Airport. The construction of this section was approved by the New York City Planning Commission and New York City Board of Estimate in 1963, and work began in 1965. The new roadway was completed in either 1967 or 1971. The construction of the highway's eastbound lanes drastically reduced congestion and increased average traffic speeds for drivers traveling eastbound on South Conduit Avenue and the Nassau Expressway. Westbound drivers on North Conduit Avenue continued to experience 10 to 15 miles per hour (16 to 24 km/h) congestion since no new highway lanes had been built for these drivers. This corridor saw an average of 600,000 daily trips by 1981, of which 20% were made by airport travelers.

Construction along Rockaway Boulevard and in Nassau County was hindered due to the presence of muck, which was located in the wetlands near the Queens-Nassau border. The muck could not be built upon, and removing it would be both expensive and environmentally risky. The wetlands had previously been used as a garbage landfill by the New York City Department of Sanitation. In addition, residents opposed this segment of the highway. As with the canceled Long Beach Expressway it would have created a "Chinese wall" between communities in Nassau County.

In March 1971, Governor Nelson Rockefeller revealed a plan for improving New York City highways. The plan denied funding to several proposed New York City Interstate Highways, including the Nassau Expressway segment east of 150th Street to Rockaway Boulevard. Rockefeller said that these highways did not qualify for a funding agreement from the Federal-Aid Highway Act of 1952, in which the federal government would pay 90% of the proposed highway's cost. The New York Times quoted a state official who said that this move had the effect of canceling these projects. By that time, less than a quarter of the proposed $51.8 million, 10-mile (16 km) highway had been completed. The only section open at the time, the eastbound freeway west of JFK Airport, had been built at a cost of $18 million. Maps from the 1970s show that the connector between the Van Wyck and Rockaway Boulevard had yet to be constructed. However, a 1971 New York Times article mentioned that the freeway between the Van Wyck Expressway and 150th Street was already open. At the time, the entire highway from Queens to Nassau was planned for completion in 1981.

By around late 1973, work on the project restarted. Builders sought funds from the Federal-Aid Highway Act of 1973 to pay for construction. At that time, plans called for the completion of the highway's westbound lanes west of 150th Street, as well as the sections of the freeway along Rockaway Boulevard and in Nassau County. Rockaway Boulevard would have also been relocated and modernized. However, the federal government refused to approve the funding, and the money was instead distributed among projects in Arkansas, Indiana, and Fort Worth, Texas. This further delayed the construction of the Nassau Expressway. By then, the unbuilt segment in Nassau was called the "phantom expressway" because it had been in the planning stages for decades. The right-of-way for the unbuilt expressway became an unused, rodent-infested "wasteland". Meanwhile, Rockaway Turnpike was carrying five times the number of cars it had been built to accommodate.

In 1976, New York Governor Hugh Carey announced the publication of the New York State Department of Transportation (NYSDOT)'s five-year, $212 million highway improvement plan. This proposal included completing much of the rest of the Nassau Expressway. Three years later, the NYSDOT published plans for the segment of the expressway that would be built in Nassau. A revised plan for the Nassau County section of the highway was introduced around 1981. It called for a four-lane arterial highway between Rockaway Turnpike and the Atlantic Beach Bridge. This section was opened in March 1990.

Also around 1980, plans to complete the westbound lanes of the expressway in Queens were reintroduced. The new expressway would include direct access to Aqueduct Racetrack. Work on the expressway project was to begin in 1998. However, by the 1990s, the project had not commenced, even though the new expressway would have relieved congestion on the parallel Belt Parkway. Construction was delayed indefinitely in 1995 due to a lack of funds due to the early-1990s recession, as well as a general decline in horse racing at the Aqueduct Racetrack, which obviated the need for the westbound freeway in Queens.

In 1998, Nassau County legislator Bruce A. Blakeman proposed renaming the southern portion of NY 878 after President Ronald Reagan. Originally, he wanted that name applied to the Seaford–Oyster Bay Expressway (NY 135) further east. After opposition to that expressway's renaming, Blakeman then proposed renaming the Nassau Expressway after Reagan. However, the Nassau Expressway renaming proposal was also opposed.

In October 2014, Nassau County Legislator Howard Kopel (representing Lawrence) and New York State Assemblyman Phil Goldfeder (representing Howard Beach, Broad Channel, and the Rockaways) advocated for the completion of the entire Nassau Expressway, in order to alleviate traffic on Rockaway Boulevard and Rockaway Turnpike, and to provide an evacuation route in the event of a natural disaster.

=== Designation history ===
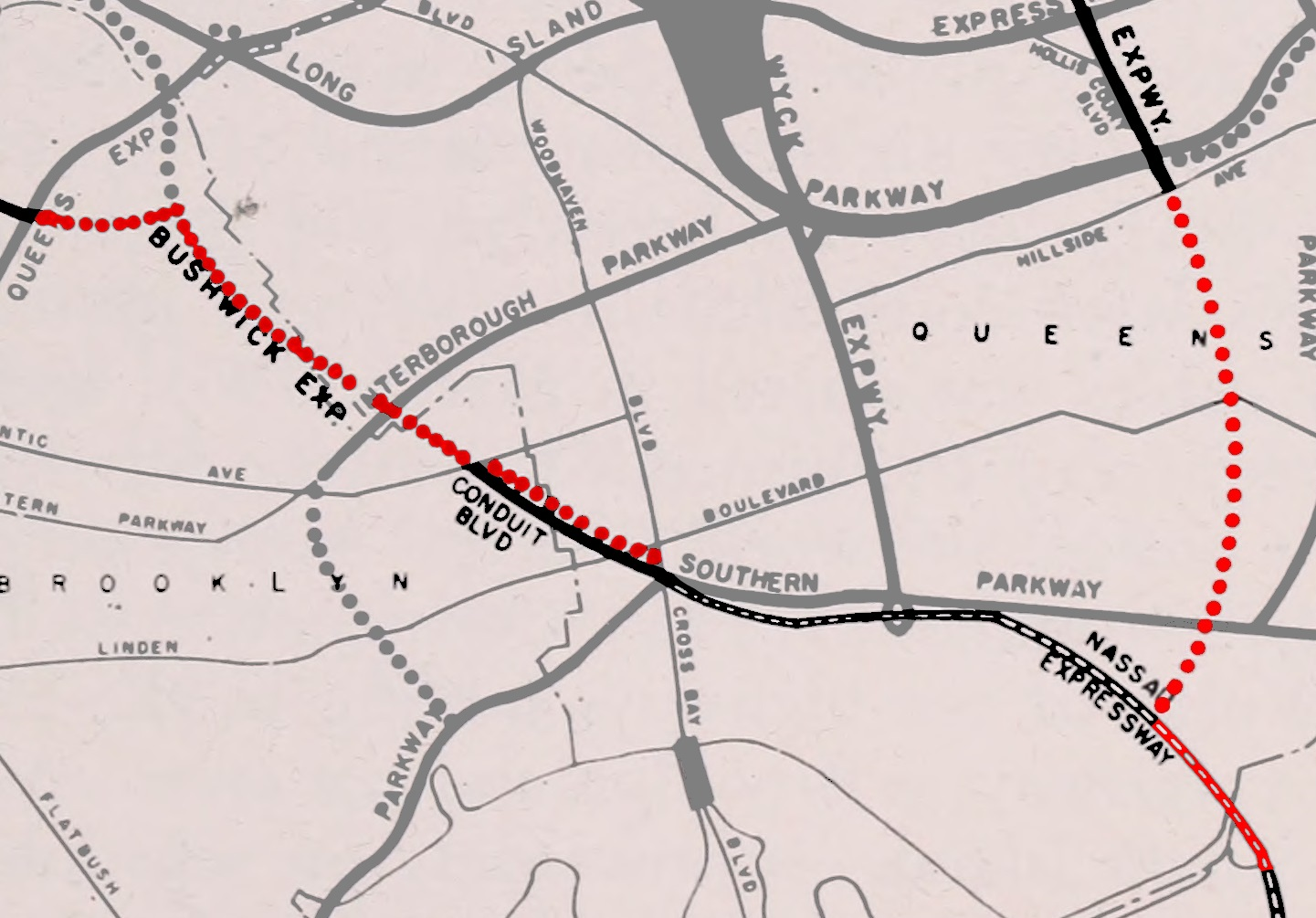
A 1964 map showing the planned I-78, including the Bushwick Expressway, Nassau Expressway, and Clearview Expressway extension

From circa 1959 until 1970, the I-878 designation was used for a section of what is now I-278 (Bruckner Expressway) between Sheridan Boulevard (formerly the Sheridan Expressway) and the Cross Bronx Expressway (I-95) in the Bronx. I-278 was routed north on the Sheridan, while its present route was taken by I-878. At that time, the northwest piece of present NY 878 was to be part of I-78, which would have continued from the Holland Tunnel along the Lower Manhattan Expressway, Williamsburg Bridge and Bushwick Expressway to reach the Nassau Expressway at Cross Bay Boulevard. Northeast of Kennedy Airport, I-78 was to turn north onto the Clearview Expressway, using the Throgs Neck Bridge and Cross Bronx Expressway to end at the Bruckner Interchange.

The one-way eastbound section of the Nassau Expressway from Cross Bay Boulevard to the Van Wyck Expressway was built in 1967, when the highway was still part of I-78. I-78 through New York City was canceled in March 1971. Effective January 1, 1970, the year before, the Nassau Expressway and unbuilt Cross Brooklyn Expressway, stretching from I-278 at the Verrazzano–Narrows Bridge east to the Atlantic Beach Bridge, was officially designated I-878 by the NYSDOT. The Nassau Expressway was redesignated as NY 878 by 1991.

Until 2005, the southern terminus of the southern portion of NY 878 was at Meadow Causeway. At the time, the portion of the Nassau Expressway from Meadow Causeway to the Seagirt Boulevard interchange was maintained by Nassau County while the section between the Seagirt Boulevard interchange and the Atlantic Beach Bridge toll barrier was maintained by the NYSDOT as NY 900V, a 0.25-mile (400 m) long reference route. In 2005, NY 878 was extended south to its present terminus at the Atlantic Beach Bridge toll barrier, resulting in an overlap with NY 900V. The NY 900V designation, now redundant to NY 878, was removed by October 2007.

== Exit list ==
Exit numbers on NY 878's northern segment are only posted in the eastbound direction. There are no exit numbers for the westbound lanes.

County	Location	mi	km	Exit	Destinations	Notes
Queens	Ozone Park	0.0	0.0	–	NY 27 west (South Conduit Avenue)	Western terminus of eastbound NY 878
Queens	Ozone Park	0.4	0.64	–	NY 27 east (South Conduit Avenue) / Belt Parkway to Lefferts Boulevard – Long Term Parking	Eastbound exit only
Queens	South Ozone Park	1.9– 2.1	3.1– 3.4	1	I-678 (Van Wyck Expressway) – Whitestone Bridge, Kennedy Airport	No westbound entrance; signed as exits 1S (south) and 1N (north); I-678 south not signed; exits 1E-W on I-678
Queens	South Ozone Park	2.4	3.9	–	NY 27 west (North Conduit Avenue) / Belt Parkway west – Kennedy Airport, Verrazzano Bridge	Westbound exit only; western terminus of westbound NY 878
Queens	Springfield Gardens	2.76	4.44	2S	JFK Expressway south – Kennedy Airport	No westbound exit; northern terminus of JFK Expressway
Queens	Springfield Gardens	2.9	4.7	2N	NY 27 east (South Conduit Avenue) / Belt Parkway east	Eastbound exit only
Queens	Springfield Gardens	3.3	5.3	Eastern end of freeway section		
Queens	Springfield Gardens	3.3	5.3	3	North Hangar Road / North Boundary Road – Kennedy Airport	At-grade intersection with westbound jughandle
Queens	Springfield Gardens	3.73	6.00		Rockaway Boulevard	Eastern terminus; at-grade intersection with eastbound reverse jughandle
Gap in route
Nassau	Inwood	0.0	0.0	–	Nassau Expressway / Burnside Avenue	Northern terminus; at-grade intersection
Nassau	Lawrence	1.3– 1.45	2.1– 2.33	–	Rock Hall Road	At-grade intersection except northbound exit
Nassau	Lawrence	1.71	2.75	–	Seagirt Boulevard – Rockaways, Brooklyn	Trumpet interchange; last southbound exit before toll
Nassau	Lawrence	1.96	3.15	–	Atlantic Beach Bridge – Atlantic Beach, Long Beach	Continuation south
1.000 mi = 1.609 km; 1.000 km = 0.621 mi: Incomplete access; Tolled
