= Belt Parkway =

Highway in New York

Belt Parkway

- Belt Parkway highlighted in red

Route information
- Maintained by NYSDOT and NYCDOT
- Length: 25.29 mi (40.70 km)
- Existed: June 29, 1940–present
- Component highways: NY 27 along service roads from Howard Beach to Laurelton
- Restrictions: No commercial vehicles

Major junctions
- West end: I-278 in Sunset Park
- I-278 Toll in Fort Hamilton; NY 27 in Howard Beach; I-678 / NY 878 in South Ozone Park; NY 27 in Laurelton
- East end: Cross Island Parkway / Southern State Parkway at the Cambria Heights–North Valley Stream line

Location
- Country: United States
- State: New York
- Counties: Kings, Queens

Highway system
- New York Highways; Interstate; US; State; Reference; Parkways

The Belt Parkway is the name given to a series of controlled-access parkways that form a belt-like circle around the New York City boroughs of Brooklyn and Queens. The Belt Parkway comprises three of the four parkways in what is known as the Belt System: the Shore Parkway, the Southern Parkway (not to be confused with the Southern State Parkway), and the Laurelton Parkway. The three parkways in the Belt System are a combined 25.29 miles (40.70 km) in length. The Cross Island Parkway makes up the fourth parkway in the system, but is signed separately.

== Route description ==
The Shore Parkway, Southern Parkway, Laurelton Parkway, and Cross Island Parkway are collectively known as the "Belt System". The four components of the Belt System are designated as New York State Route 907C (NY 907C), NY 907D, NY 907B, and NY 907A, respectively, by the New York State Department of Transportation. All four numbers are reference route designations and are not signed. Excluding the Cross Island Parkway, the other three segments are now known collectively as the official "Belt Parkway". It is designated an east–west route, and its exit numbering system begins, in standard fashion, at the western terminus of the Shore Parkway, the westernmost parkway in the system. The numbering increases as the parkway proceeds eastward, and continues onto the Cross Island at the eastern terminus of the Belt Parkway. The north–south parkway retains the numbering scheme to its northern terminus.

=== Shore Parkway ===
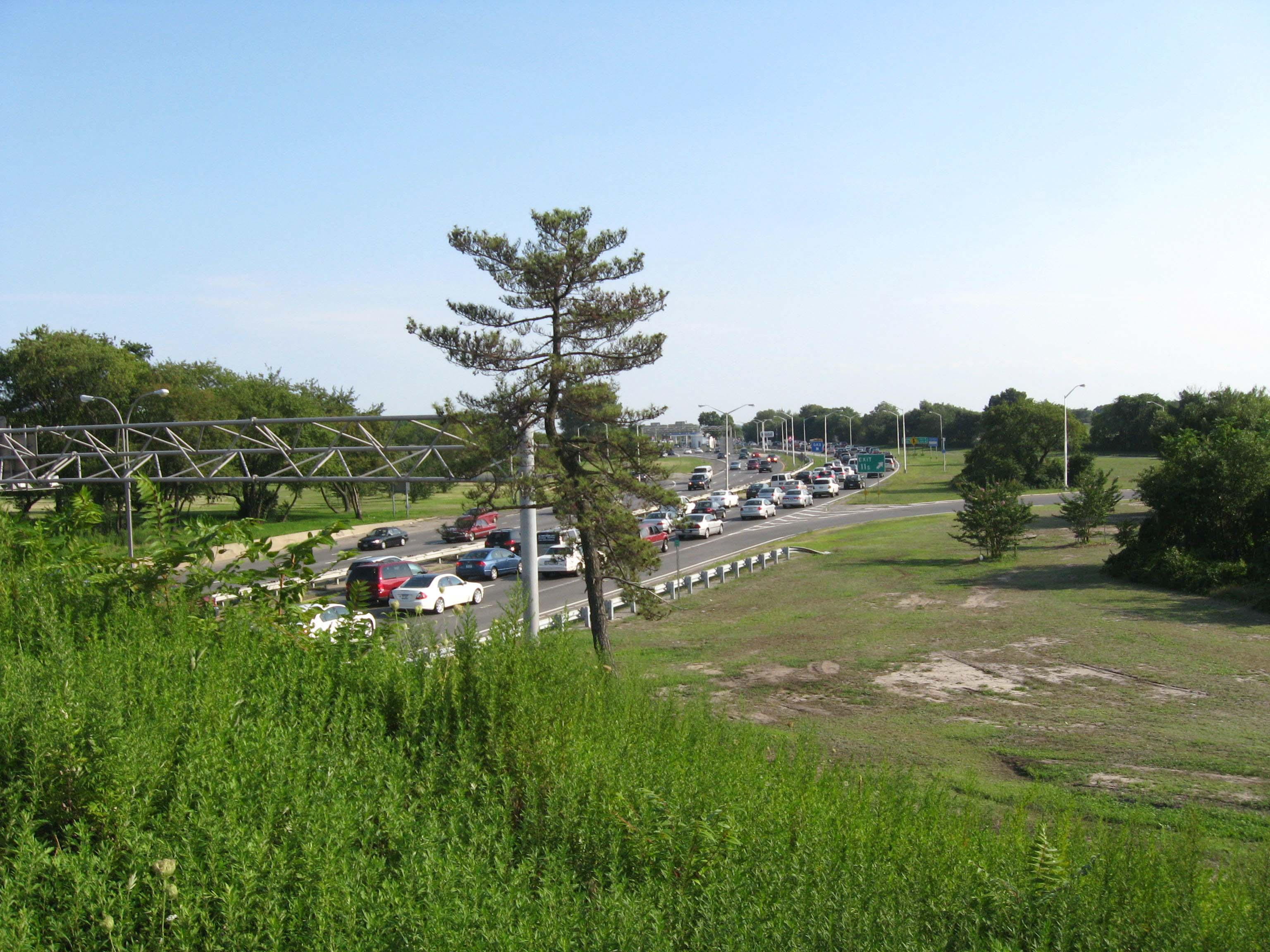
Westbound from Flatbush Avenue

The Belt Parkway begins at an interchange (exit 22) with the Gowanus Expressway in the Bay Ridge section of Brooklyn. Paralleling Third Avenue, the parkway turns west and crosses over the Long Island Rail Road Bay Ridge Branch, a freight-only line. Bypassing Bay Ridge, the Belt passes exit 1, which services 65th–67th Streets in Bay Ridge. Crossing south past Owl's Head Park, the parkway turns southward and enters Shore Road Park, paralleling the shore of the Upper New York Bay. The eastbound lanes of the Belt Parkway pass several small parking areas that serve as viewing spots for the bay. Connections across the parkway to Bay Ridge are also present at these parking areas. Beginning the bend to the southeast, the parkway passes Andrew Lehman Field.

Just east of the field, the Belt Parkway comes within the shadows of the Verrazzano–Narrows Bridge and passes exit 2, which serves as the southern terminus of Fourth Avenue. After crossing under the bridge, the westbound lanes enter exit 3 which connects to the Verrazzano. Eastbound, the lanes from the bridge connecting to the Belt merge in, as the road enters Dyker Beach Park and Golf Course. During a short gap away from the shore, the Belt passes a parking area for Dyker Beach Park, entering exit 4, which services Bay 8th Street and 14th Avenue. Continuing along the park, the Belt begins to parallel Cropsey Avenue and passes another parking area before reaching exit 5, a junction with Bay Parkway. This marks the eastern end of Dyker Beach Park, and the route begins to parallel shoreline strip malls before reaching Calvert Vaux Park.

Now in the Gravesend section of Brooklyn, the Belt passes exit 6, which connects to Cropsey Avenue. Westbound, this junction is split into exit 6N and exit 6S, also serving Stillwell Avenue. The parkway bends eastward and crosses over the Coney Island Complex, a large railroad yard for the New York City Subway. Just before passing exit 7, the eastbound lanes cross just north of the Neptune Avenue subway station. Exit 7 eastbound services Ocean Parkway, which is met by exit 7B proceeding westbound. Westbound, exit 7A services Shell Road in Gravesend. Paralleling the namesake Neptune Avenue, the parkway enters Sheepshead Bay and connections to Coney Island.

At exit 8, the Belt Parkway connects to Coney Island Avenue, approaching the namesake bay as it continues east. Paralleling Emmons Avenue through Sheepshead Bay, the parkway passes exit 9A eastbound, which connects to Knapp Street and exit 9B, which is a ramp to the eastern end of Emmons Avenue. Westbound, exit 9 services Knapp Street. Crossing south of Gerritsen Beach, the parkway passes south of the Plum Beach Channel and passes a small rest area on the eastbound lanes. Turning northeast through the Floyd Bennett Field area, the parkway bends north and passes a service area with gas services in the median. Just north of the service area, the Belt passes exit 11N–S, a cloverleaf interchange which connects to Flatbush Avenue and the Rockaways.

After exit 11N, the Belt Parkway continues east through Floyd Bennett Field, crossing over the Mill Basin Drawbridge into Brooklyn Beach and passes the entrance to the Jamaica Bay Riding Academy, the only business served directly on the parkway. Crossing over another bridge, the parkway enters the Canarsie section of Brooklyn. The parkway, now running northeast, parallels a bicycle path, reaching Canarsie Pier and exit 13, which serves as the southern end of Rockaway Parkway. Crossing over another bridge over Spring Creek, the parkway passes exit 14, which connects to Pennsylvania Avenue in Starrett City. The interchange is adjacent to the former Pennsylvania Avenue Landfill. After crossing another waterway, Hendrix Creek, the Belt passes the former Fountain Avenue Landfill and passes exit 15, a diamond interchange with Erskine Street leading to the Gateway Center shopping complex.

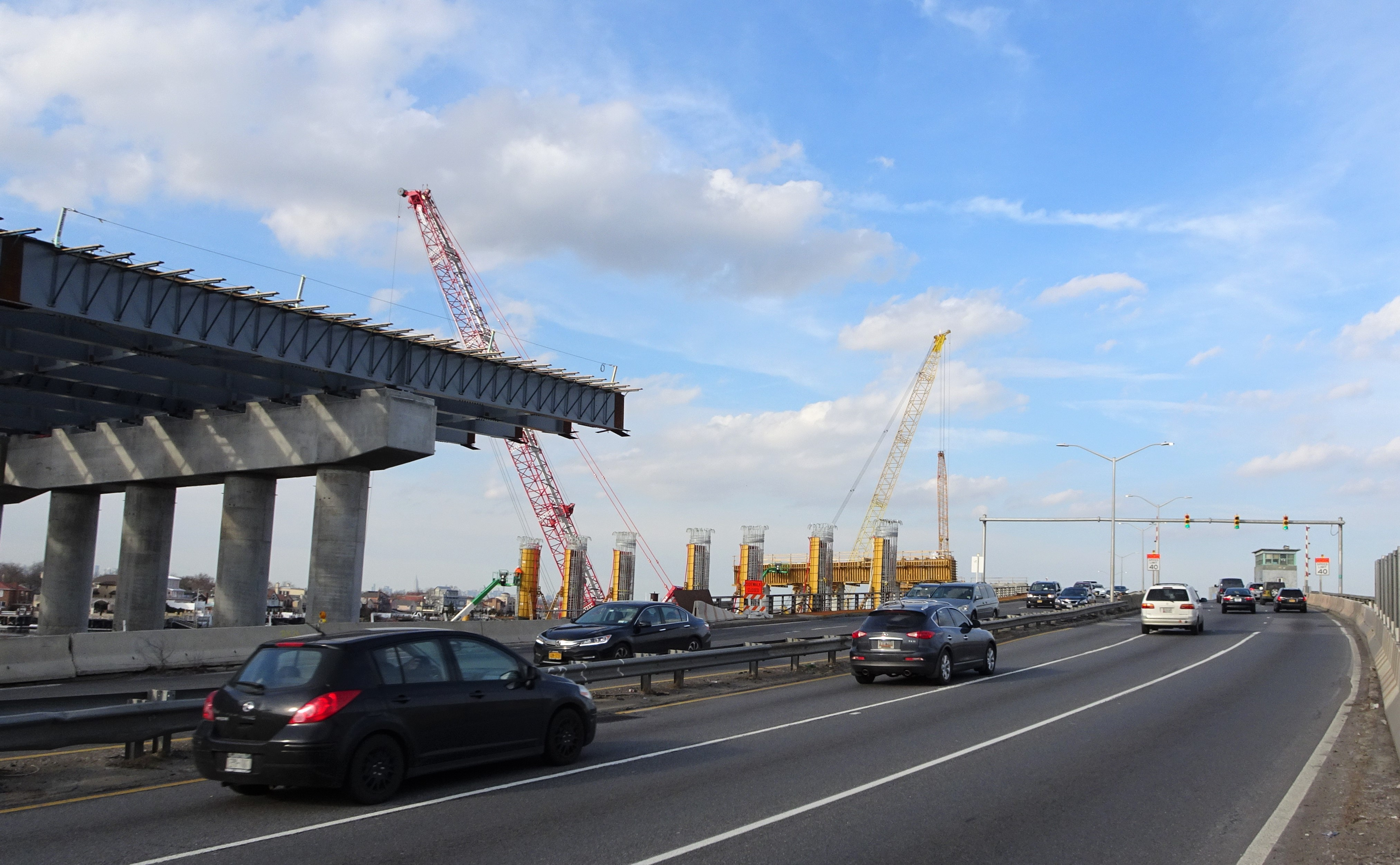
Replacement for Mill Basin drawbridge

Now crossing over the Old Mill Basin section of Jamaica Bay, the Belt Parkway continues northeast in the borough of Queens, entering exit 17N–S, Cross Bay Boulevard and Cohancy Street, which also connects to the Cross Bay Bridge and towards the Rockaways. Crossing into an interchange with NY 27, the parkway travels under the IND Rockaway Line (A train) and passes exit 18B, which connects to Aqueduct Racetrack in Ozone Park.

=== Southern and Laurelton Parkways ===
Now on the Southern Parkway section of the Belt, the Belt continues eastward into exit 19, which connects to NY 878 (the Nassau Expressway) and indirectly with I-678, the Van Wyck Expressway. This interchange also serves as access to John F. Kennedy International Airport. Now with North and South Conduit Avenues serving as westbound and eastbound frontage roads for the parkway, passing exit 20, a junction with the JFK Expressway and the airport. Crossing under the Van Wyck, the Belt continues east through multiple underpasses and overpasses before reaching exit 21A, westbound side, which services 150th Street and Rockaway Boulevard. Crossing under Guy R. Brewer Boulevard, the Belt passes exit 21B, which connects to Farmers Boulevard and Guy R. Brewer Boulevard.

Exit 22 services Springfield Boulevard, where the Belt Parkway begins to parallel a Long Island Rail Road line through Laurelton. Westbound, exit 23A services North Conduit Boulevard (NY 27) and 225th Street, while eastbound, exit 23B services NY 27 and the Sunrise Highway. At this junction, the parkway turns northeast and joins the Laurelton Parkway segment, which connects to exit 24A, Merrick Boulevard (also known as Floyd H. Flake Boulevard) in both directions, and Francis Lewis Boulevard on the eastbound lanes. Exit 24B on the eastbound lanes connects also to Merrick Boulevard and 130th Avenue and on the westbound lanes connect Francis Lewis Boulevard. Just after crossing under 130th Avenue, the Belt passes exit 25A–B. At this interchange, the Laurelton Parkway segment ends, with exit 25A connecting to the western terminus of the Southern State Parkway and exit 25B servicing Elmont Road.

At this interchange, the Belt Parkway crosses over the Southern State and becomes the Cross Island Parkway, which continues north through Queens, connecting to I-495, the Grand Central Parkway and eventually I-678, the Whitestone Expressway.

== History ==
=== Proposal ===
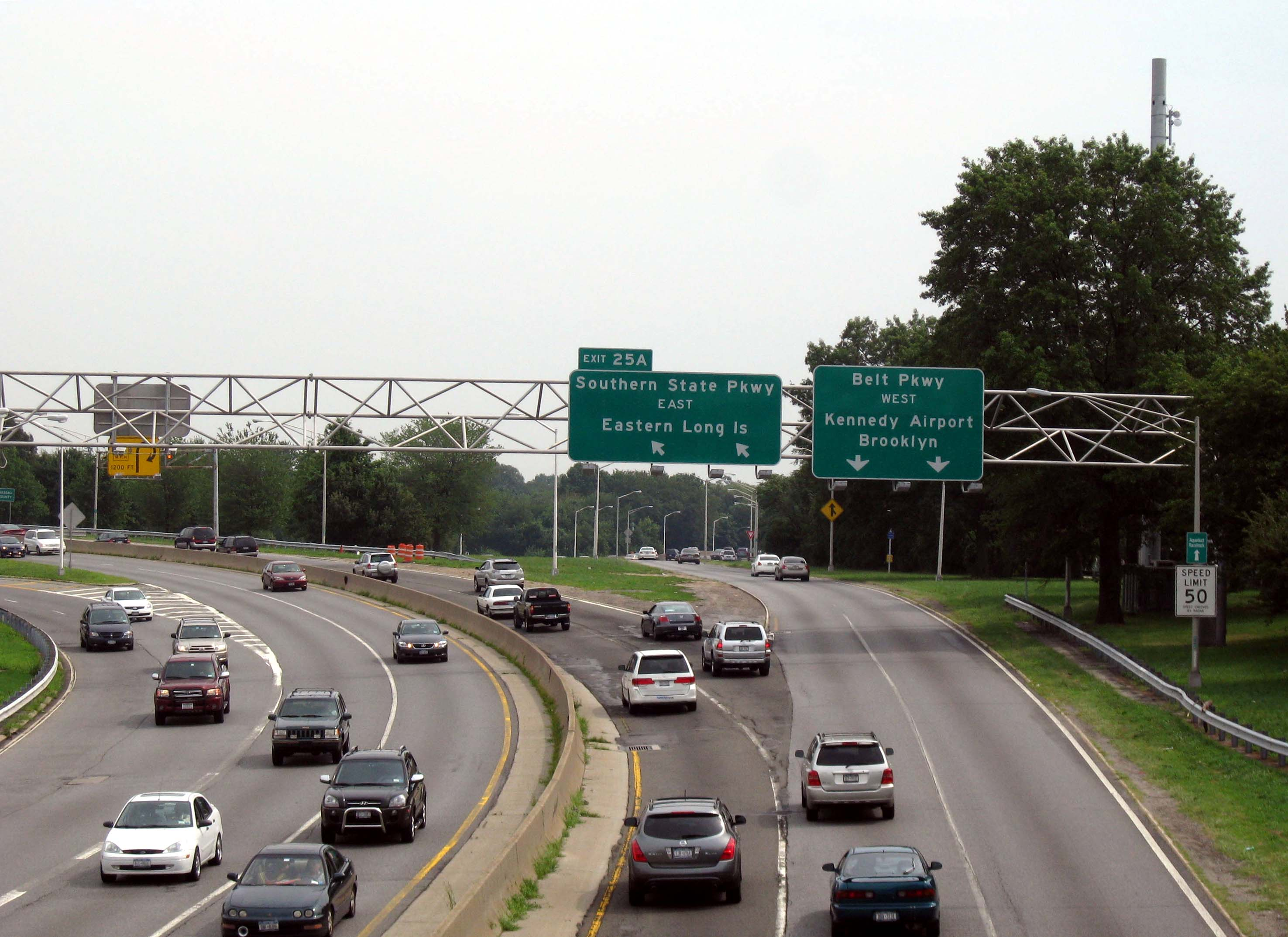
Exit 25A as seen from the southbound Cross Island Parkway

The Belt Parkway was proposed by public official and highway advocate Robert Moses on February 25, 1930 to provide highway access to Manhattan and to connect to, and use similar design principles to, parkways already constructed on Long Island and Westchester County, New York. At the time, the Belt project was referred to as the "Marginal Boulevard". The Belt system was part of a "Metropolitan Loop" running through all five boroughs of New York City as well as New Jersey, proposed by the Regional Plan Association in 1929. Other highways proposed in this loop included the future Cross Bronx Expressway and Staten Island Expressway.

In a 1937 report titled "New Parkways in New York City", the New York City Parks Department proposed the Belt Parkway in the following outline:

The Circumferential Parkway begins at Owl's Head Park at the Narrows, and follows the Shore Drive through Fort Hamilton and Dyker Beach Park. The City of New York was vested title in an extension along Gravesend Bay to Bensonhurst Park, and is about to acquire the remaining rights-of-way up to Guilder Avenue, including sufficient land for the conversion of Guilder Avenue into a genuine parkway with service roads. It is proposed to acquire the rights-of-way for the extension of Guilder Avenue by means of a new parkway parallel to, and north of Emmons Avenue to the Marine Parkway extension, for which land is already in the possession of the City. It is proposed to carry the Circumferential Parkway from Flatbush Avenue where the Marine Parkway extension ends, along or near Jamaica Bay to a point on Southern Parkway, just east of the Rockaway division of the Long Island Railroad in Queens. Work on the conversion of the Sunrise Highway into a genuine parkway is already under way. This will be known as Southern Parkway.

=== Construction ===
Upper New York and Staten Island, as seen from the Belt Parkway

Construction began in 1934. New highway designs were implemented, including dark main roads and lighter-colored entrance and exit ramps. The parkway first opened on June 29, 1940, with most of Cross Island, Southern, and Shore Parkway sections completed. A 12-mile (19 km) bike path along the Southern Brooklyn section of the Belt Parkway opened in 1941.

The construction of Belt Parkway entailed:

- 11,800,000 cubic yards (9,000,000 m^{3}) of hydraulic fill pumped
- 4,800,000 cubic yards (3,700,000 m^{3}) of dry fill moved
- 1,500,000 square yards (1,300,000 m^{2}) of pavement used
- 530,000 cubic yards (410,000 m^{3}) of concrete used
- 11,500 cubic yards (8,800 m^{3}) of masonry used
- 400,000 feet (120,000 m) of piles used
- 320,000 short tons (290,000 long tons) of steel used
- 9,000 men employed

All the original parkways, except the Gowanus, were built on grassy rights-of-way with trees, in a more green surrounding than most highways of their time. To build sections between exits 7 and 8 in the 1930s parts of Coney Island Creek were filled in, finishing the process, begun over a decade before construction began, of turning Coney Island from an island into a peninsula. The Gowanus Parkway, in part replacing the demolished Fifth Avenue Line, was built as an elevated structure over Third and Hamilton Avenues in order to avoid the active docks and industrial areas including Sunset Park, Brooklyn.

Like most parkways in New York State, the parkways comprising the Belt System were closed to commercial traffic, including any vehicle with a non-passenger registration and all commercial trucking of any size. Originally even station wagons, which had "suburban" registrations, were excluded but they were later allowed, along with passenger-registered SUVs and vans.

=== Completed system ===
The Belt Parkway formed the southern portion of a system of parkways and highways that connected every borough except Staten Island. At its eastern end, the Belt Parkway became the Cross Island Parkway, which connected to the Bronx–Whitestone Bridge and the Hutchinson River Parkway in the east Bronx. At its western end, the Belt Parkway led to the Gowanus Expressway, the Brooklyn–Battery Tunnel, the West Side Elevated Highway, and the Henry Hudson Parkway to the west Bronx. The Henry Hudson and Hutchinson River parkways were connected in the Bronx via Van Cortlandt Park, Mosholu Parkway, and Pelham Parkway, all of which were surface-level roads. Some portions of the original system were converted to expressways, which could be used by commercial traffic. The Gowanus Expressway replaced the Gowanus Parkway in 1950 and became part of the Interstate Highway System as I-278. The Whitestone Parkway was expanded into the Whitestone Expressway starting in 1957; it also became an Interstate Highway and is signed as part of I-678. In the late 1940s, the parkway was widened in its entirety.

In 1969, the New York City Council co-named the Belt Parkway Leif Ericson Drive between exit 2 and exit 9, to recognize the large Scandinavian population in Bay Ridge. By 1970, signage on much of the parkway's length (except for the Cross Island Parkway section) had been replaced by signs reading "Belt Parkway". The segment of NY 27A that ran concurrently with the parkway was removed in 1972. In the 1980s, the viaduct carrying traffic over the Coney Island Yard was reconstructed. In September 2002, Exit 15 was opened to serve the nearby Gateway Center commercial development. in 2005, a project to reconstruct Exit 17 was competed. The old cloverleaf interchange was demolished, and a new Diamond interchange with wider deceleration lanes and gentler turns was constructed in its place.

In October 2009, NYCDOT launched the first phase of a capital project to reconstruct seven obsolete bridges along the Belt Parkway. The first phase included the reconstruction of an overpass ramp from Guider Avenue, as well as the replacement of the Paerdegat Basin and Rockaway Parkway bridges, which was completed in 2012. In 2021, the Metropolitan Transportation Authority proposed widening a 2-mile (3.2 km) section of the Belt Parkway near the Verrazzano–Narrows Bridge.

== Exit list ==
| County | Location | mi | km | Old exit | New exit | Destinations | Notes |
|---|---|---|---|---|---|---|---|
| Brooklyn | Sunset Park | 0.00 | 0.00 | | 0 | I-278 east (Brooklyn–Queens Expressway) – Queens, Bronx | Western terminus; exit 22 on I-278; former NY 27A |
| Brooklyn | Bay Ridge | 0.80– 1.20 | 1.29– 1.93 | 3 | 1 | To 65th–67th Streets | Access via Shore Road |
| Brooklyn | Fort Hamilton | 3.10– 3.50 | 4.99– 5.63 | 4 | 2 | 4th Avenue / Fort Hamilton Parkway | |
| Brooklyn | Fort Hamilton | 3.70 | 5.95 | | 3 | I-278 Toll west (Verrazzano–Narrows Bridge) – Staten Island | Westbound exit and eastbound entrance; exit 16 on I-278 |
| Brooklyn | Fort Hamilton–Bath Beach line | 4.47 | 7.19 | 5 | 4 | Bay 8th Street / 14th Avenue | |
| Brooklyn | Bath Beach–Gravesend line | 5.63 | 9.06 | 6 | 5 | Bay Parkway | |
| Brooklyn | Gravesend | 6.40 | 10.30 | 7 | 6S | Cropsey Avenue South | Signed as Cropsey Avenue - Coney Island eastbound as exit 6 |
| Brooklyn | Gravesend | 6.80 | 10.94 | 8 | 6N | Stillwell Avenue / Cropsey Avenue North | Westbound exit only |
| Brooklyn | Gravesend | 7.40– 8.20 | 11.91– 13.20 | 9 | 7A | Shell Road – Coney Island | Westbound exit and eastbound entrance; former exit 7S |
| Brooklyn | Gravesend | 7.40– 8.20 | 11.91– 13.20 | 10 | 7B | Ocean Parkway | Signed as exit 7 eastbound; former exits 7S-N |
| Brooklyn | Sheepshead Bay | 7.80– 8.50 | 12.55– 13.68 | 11 | 8 | Coney Island Avenue | |
| Brooklyn | Sheepshead Bay | 9.30 | 14.97 | 12 | 9A | Knapp Street – Sheepshead Bay | Eastbound exit and westbound entrance; exit restricted to vehicles under 5 tons |
| Brooklyn | Sheepshead Bay | 10.20 | 16.42 | 14 | 9B | Knapp Street | No westbound entrance; signed as Knapp Street-Sheepshead Bay westbound as exit 9; has a ramp entering the start of Emmons Ave. |
| Brooklyn | Floyd Bennett Field | 11.30– 11.80 | 18.19– 18.99 | 15 | 11 | Flatbush Avenue – Rockaways, Marine Park | Signed as exits 11S (south) and 11N (north) |
| Brooklyn | Bergen Beach | 12.70 | 20.44 | | 12 | Jamaica Bay Riding Academy | Eastbound exit and entrance |
| Brooklyn | Paerdegat Basin | 13.55 | 21.81 | Bridge | | | |
| Brooklyn | Canarsie | 14.38 | 23.14 | 16 | 13 | Rockaway Parkway | |
| Brooklyn | East New York | 15.42 | 24.82 | 17 | 14 | Pennsylvania Avenue | |
| Brooklyn | East New York | 16.20 | 26.07 | | 15 | Erskine Street | |
| Queens | Howard Beach | 17.60– 19.00 | 28.32– 30.58 | 18 | 17S-N | Cross Bay Boulevard / Cohancy Street – Woodhaven, Rockaways | Signed as exits 17S (south) and 17N (north) westbound |
| Queens | Howard Beach | 17.60– 19.00 | 28.32– 30.58 | 19 | 17W | NY 27 west (North Conduit Avenue) | No eastbound exit |
| Queens | South Ozone Park | 18.70– 19.20 | 30.09– 30.90 | 20 | 18 | Lefferts Boulevard – Aqueduct Racetrack, Long Term Parking | Eastbound exit is part of exit 19 |
| Queens | South Ozone Park | 18.30– 20.20 | 29.45– 32.51 | 21 | 19 | I-678 (Van Wyck Expressway) / NY 878 east (Nassau Expressway) – Kennedy Airport | No westbound access to I-678 south/NY 878; exits 1E-W on I-678 |
| Queens | South Ozone Park | 21.00– 21.30 | 33.80– 34.28 | 22 | 20 | JFK Expressway south – Kennedy Airport | Westbound exit and eastbound entrance; northern terminus of JFK Expressway |
| Queens | Springfield Gardens–Rochdale line | 19.60– 21.50 | 31.54– 34.60 | 23 | 20 (EB); 21A (WB) | 150th Street / Rockaway Boulevard | |
| Queens | Springfield Gardens–Rochdale line | 21.20– 22.20 | 34.12– 35.73 | 24 | 21B | Farmers Boulevard / Guy R. Brewer Boulevard | No eastbound access to Guy R. Brewer Boulevard |
| Queens | Springfield Gardens–Rochdale line | 21.80– 22.40 | 35.08– 36.05 | | 22 | Springfield Boulevard | |
| Queens | Laurelton–Brookville line | 22.80 | 36.69 | | 23B | NY 27 east (Sunrise Highway) / Brookville Boulevard | Eastbound exit and westbound entrance |
| Queens | Laurelton–Rosedale line | 23.30 | 37.50 | | 23A | North Conduit Avenue (NY 27 west) / 225th Street | Westbound exit only |
| Queens | Laurelton–Rosedale line | 23.40 | 37.66 | | 24A | Francis Lewis Boulevard | Westbound exit only; access via Laurelton Parkway |
| Queens | Laurelton–Rosedale line | 23.70 | 38.14 | | 24A | Merrick Boulevard to Francis Lewis Boulevard | Eastbound exit and entrance; access to Francis Lewis Boulevard via Brookville Road; former NY 27A |
| Queens | Laurelton–Rosedale line | 23.90 | 38.46 | | 24B | Merrick Boulevard to 130th Avenue | Signed for Merrick Blvd. westbound, 130th Avenue eastbound; access to 130th Avenue via Brookville Road; former NY 27A |
| Queens–Nassau county line | Cambria Heights–North Valley Stream line | 25.1 | 40.4 | | 25A | Southern State Parkway east – Eastern Long Island | Northbound exit and southbound entrance; western terminus of Southern State Parkway |
| Queens–Nassau county line | Cambria Heights–North Valley Stream line | 25.2 | 40.6 | | 25B | Elmont Road to Linden Boulevard | Northbound exit only |
| Queens–Nassau county line | Cambria Heights–North Valley Stream line | 25.29 | 40.70 | | – | Cross Island Parkway north – Whitestone Bridge | Continuation north |
1.000 mi = 1.609 km; 1.000 km = 0.621 mi: Concurrency terminus; Electronic toll collection; Incomplete access
