= Conduit Avenue =

Avenue in Brooklyn and Queens, New York

- Conduit Boulevard; North / South Conduit Avenue
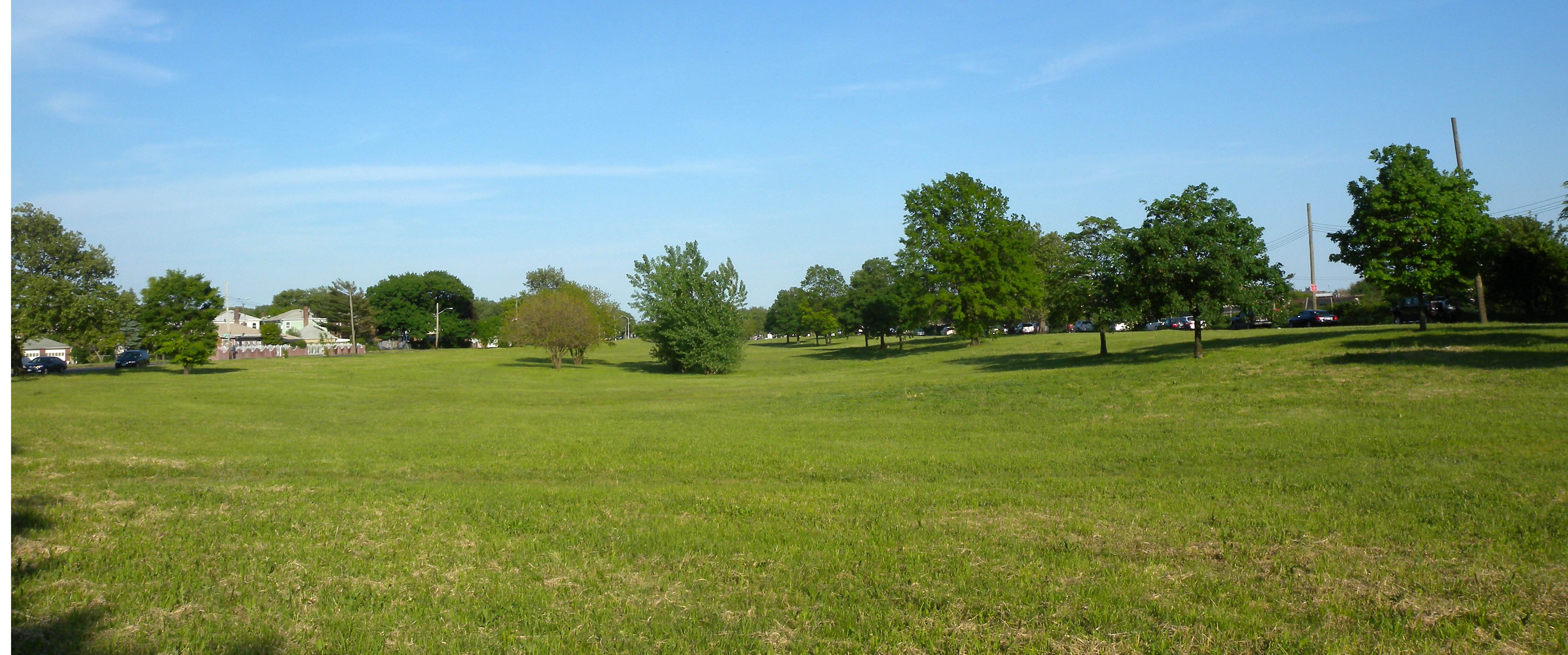
- Wide median strip at the Brooklyn-Queens border
- Interactive map of Conduit Avenue
- Namesake: Ridgewood Aqueduct
- Owner: City of New York
- Maintained by: NYSDOT and NYCDOT
- Length: 8.0 mi (12.9 km)
- Location: Brooklyn and Queens, New York City
- West end: Atlantic Avenue in Cypress Hills
- Major junctions: NY 27 (Linden Boulevard) in Lindenwood; NY 878 / Belt Parkway in South Ozone Park; I-678 in South Ozone Park; JFK Expressway in South Ozone Park; Belt Parkway in Laurelton
- East end: NY 27 / Hook Creek Boulevard in Rosedale

Conduit Avenue (Conduit Boulevard in Brooklyn) is an arterial road in New York City, the vast majority of which is in Queens. The divided highway runs from Atlantic Avenue in Cypress Hills, Brooklyn to Hook Creek Boulevard in Rosedale, Queens at the Nassau County border. The thoroughfare is named after an aqueduct in its right-of-way.

Conduit Avenue and Conduit Boulevard were conceived in 1921 as part of the Conduit Highway, later the Sunrise Highway, with the original highway opening in 1929. The highway was expanded in 1940 as part of the construction of the Belt Parkway. The Brooklyn section was originally supposed to host Interstate 78 within its median, but this section was ultimately not built.

== Etymology ==
Conduit Avenue and Conduit Boulevard are named for the conduit of the Brooklyn Waterworks, which fed Ridgewood Reservoir. The roads were constructed on the former right-of-way of the aqueduct. The conduit was known as the Ridgewood Aqueduct.

== Route ==
West of Cross Bay Boulevard, Conduit Boulevard has a wide, grassy median strip and runs adjacent to a number of parks with playgrounds. Conduit Boulevard serves as the boundary between the Brooklyn neighborhoods of Cypress Hills and City Line, and the Queens neighborhoods of Ozone Park and Lindenwood. Between the Shore Parkway and the Laurelton Parkway, Conduit Avenue serves as the service road for Southern Parkway. East of Brookville Boulevard, Conduit Avenue parallels the Montauk Branch of the Long Island Rail Road (LIRR). North Conduit Avenue ends at a junction with Hook Creek Boulevard, but South Conduit Avenue continues as Sunrise Highway in Valley Stream. Sunrise Highway westbound merges onto North Conduit Avenue just east of 225th Street.

Conduit Avenue is designated as New York State Route 27 between Linden Boulevard and the Nassau County border and accommodates car, bus and truck traffic. Westbound vehicles use the roadway named North Conduit Avenue; eastbound vehicles use South Conduit Avenue. At various times the road has been used as a drag strip, particularly in Rosedale.

The western segment of the highway, between Atlantic Avenue and Cross Bay Boulevard, was originally slated to be the eastern part of a planned, but never built, Bushwick Expressway. That highway was proposed to run from the Williamsburg Bridge through Williamsburg, Bushwick and East New York before feeding into the Belt Parkway.

== Transportation ==
Conduit Avenue and Conduit Boulevard are served by the following bus routes:

- The Q85 and Q89 buses run on the corridor east of Springfield Boulevard. The Q85 diverts either to 243rd Street (Rosedale), or from Francis Lewis Boulevard (Jamaica). The Q89 continues until Conduit's eastern end towards Green Acres Mall, and is joined with the Q87 and weekend Q5 buses east of Hook Creek Boulevard.
  - Overnight weekend Q5 service to Rosedale goes in the opposite direction to Francis Lewis Boulevard, using the parallel Sunrise Highway.
- East of Linden Boulevard, the BM5 express runs in both directions to Cross Bay Boulevard, then north on its journey to Manhattan. JFK-bound B15 service goes to 90th Street and continues via Nassau Expressway, while Brooklyn-bound service originates at Lefferts Boulevard.
- Q10 buses to JFK Airport run from 130th Street to 134th Street.

In addition, the Aqueduct–North Conduit Avenue station of the New York City Subway, served by the A train, is near Cohancy Street.

== History ==
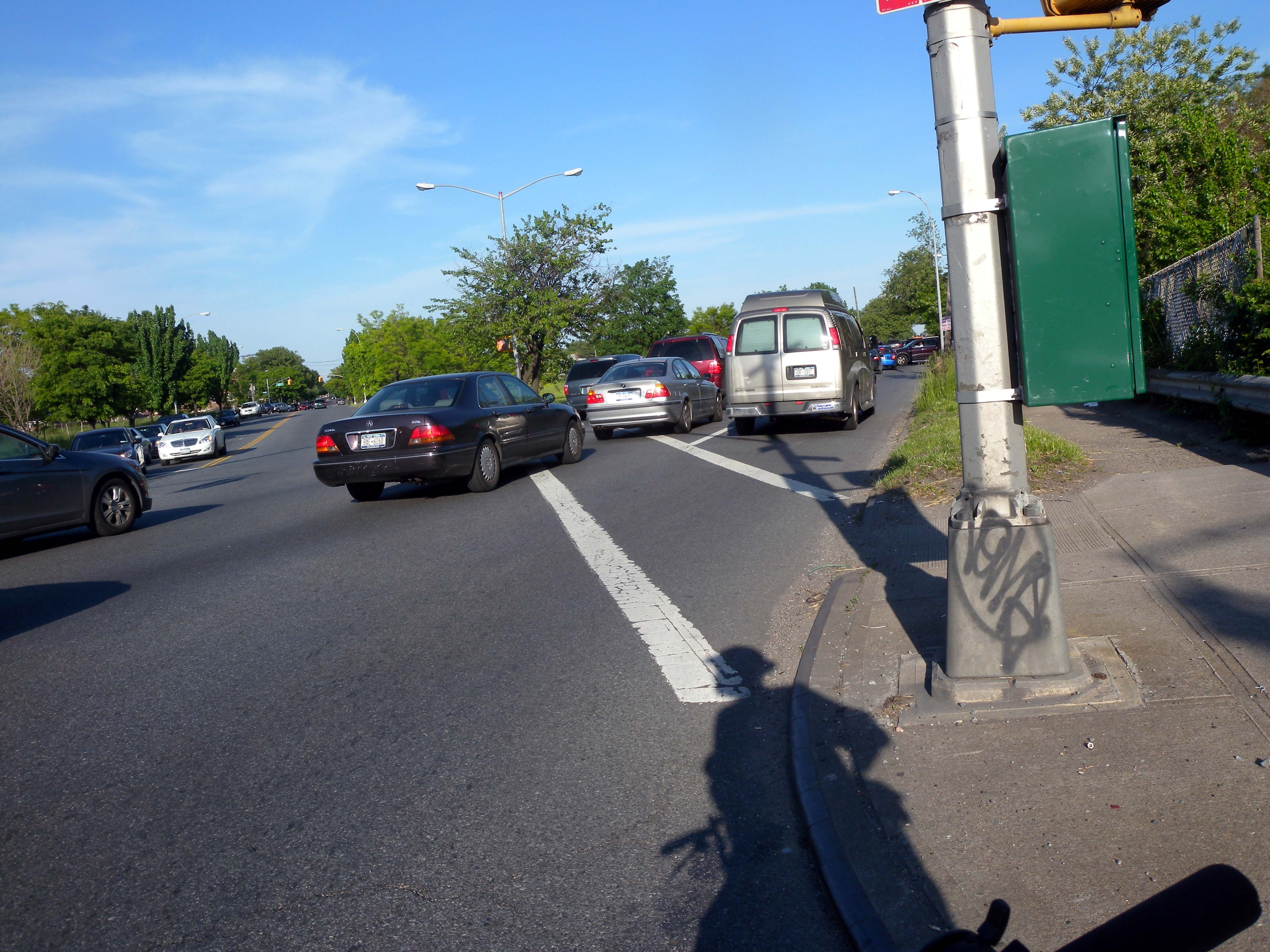
The intersection of Conduit Boulevard and Sutter Avenue, on the Brooklyn side of the Brooklyn-Queens border.

The original Brooklyn Waterworks brick conduit stretched from Long Island to the Ridgewood Pumping Station, now the site of City Line Park, in East New York. There, the water was pushed via a steam-powered pump north through a "force tube" into the Ridgewood Reservoir; the route of this tube is now Force Tube Avenue. The reservoir was opened in 1858, and the pumping station in 1886. The aqueduct was located on the north side of what is now Conduit Avenue, and was built on a right-of-way that had not been developed at the time. When the City of Brooklyn was consolidated as a borough of New York City in 1898, New York City gained possession of the Brooklyn Waterworks' assets, including the reservoir and its 25-mile (40 km) long aqueduct stretching to Massapequa in Nassau County. At this time, the right-of-way was still largely undeveloped, with the conduits located underground. Both Force Tube Avenue and Conduit Avenue were laid out and paved by the 1910s.

Plans to construct a highway along the conduit path emerged around 1913. In 1921, the New York State Legislature signed a bill to construct a highway along the right-of-way known as Conduit Highway, ending in Amityville. The route included both Conduit Avenue and the Sunrise Highway. The original plans called for a grade-separated parkway, but the route was later designed to be 30 to 40 feet (9.1 to 12.2 m) wide. The highway was planned to relieve congestion on Merrick Road/Merrick Boulevard. Construction began on the highway in 1924 or 1925. In conjunction with the project, what was then Linden Avenue was extended east from Kings Highway to Conduit Boulevard, becoming Linden Boulevard. The highway was referred to by various names including Conduit Boulevard and Pipe Line Boulevard. By 1928, the entire stretch from Brooklyn to Amityville was officially named the Sunrise Highway, following efforts by the Long Island Chamber of Commerce. The label Conduit was deemed "an unattractive one and quite meaningless." The Sunrise Highway name, meanwhile, was reference to the nickname for Long Island, "Land of the Sunrise Trails". The entire highway was opened on June 9, 1929. An inauguration ceremony was held at Liberty Avenue in Brooklyn. In 1931, the city planned to extend Conduit Boulevard north to Jamaica Avenue along Force Tube Avenue, which would require condemning property along the avenue in order to widen it, but this never took place.

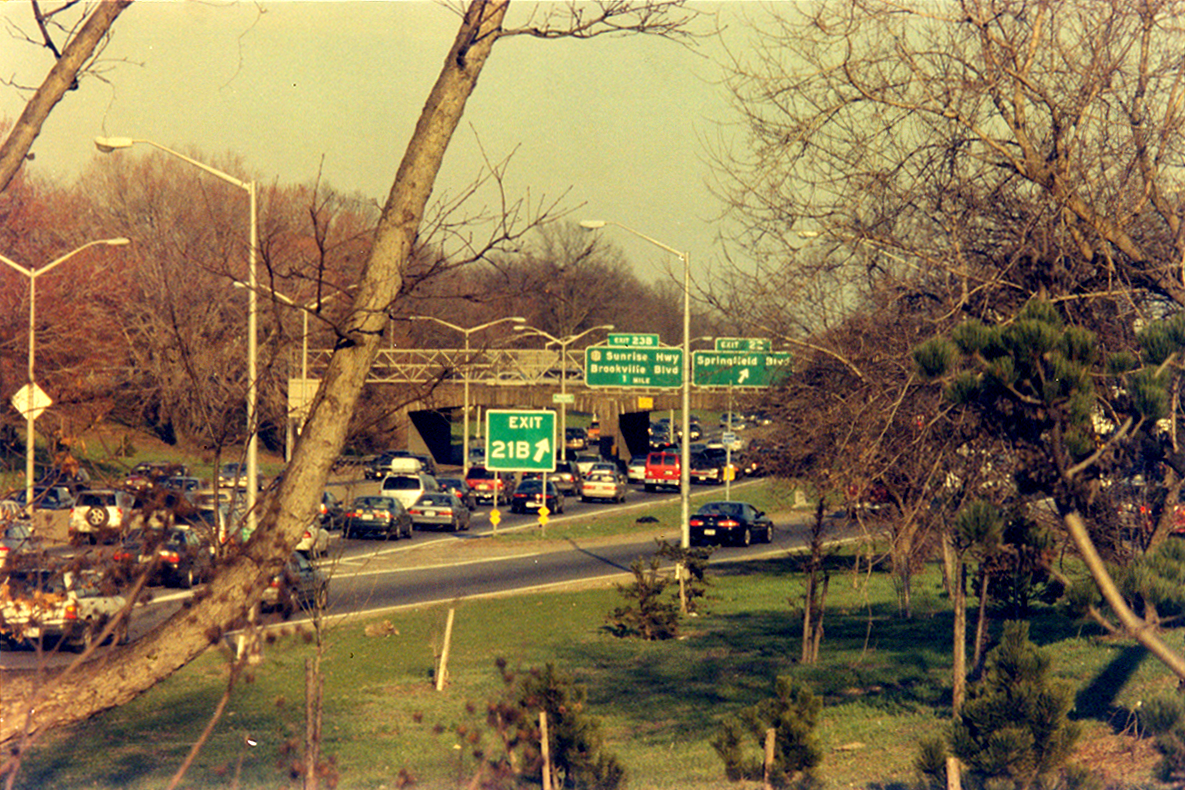
The Southern Parkway in Springfield Gardens, built along the Conduit corridor.

In the early 1930s, it was proposed to convert the Conduit Boulevard route between Linden Boulevard and Laurelton Boulevard/Brookville Boulevard into a state parkway, with North and South Conduit Avenues created as service roads for the parkway. The purpose of the project was to create express highway links between Brooklyn and Nassau County, via Linden Boulevard, Sunrise Highway, and the Southern State Parkway. The original 1931 plans, known as the Southern State Parkway extension, called for an arterial road adjacent to the existing narrow Sunrise Highway. Later plans called for a parkway. As early as July 1934, land was acquired via eminent domain to widen Conduit Boulevard and build the new parkway. The project would become the Southern Parkway section of the Belt Parkway, which would connect to the Belt system's Laurelton Parkway at Brookville Boulevard and feed into the Southern State Parkway. In justifying the conversion of the Conduit route into part of the Belt system, New York City Parks commissioner Robert Moses cited the "approximately 10,000,000 cars" traveling the route on an annual basis, and the need for a highway link between Brooklyn and Long Island to create "the ultimate circumferential boulevard."

North and South Conduit Avenue were constructed as service roads along with the Southern Parkway. Shortly after the opening of the Belt Parkway system in 1940, Conduit Boulevard west of the parkway was expanded into a six-lane highway, with the right-of-way widened to create the grassy median. The project was undertaken in conjunction with the widening of Atlantic Avenue and grade separation of the Long Island Rail Road's Atlantic Branch.

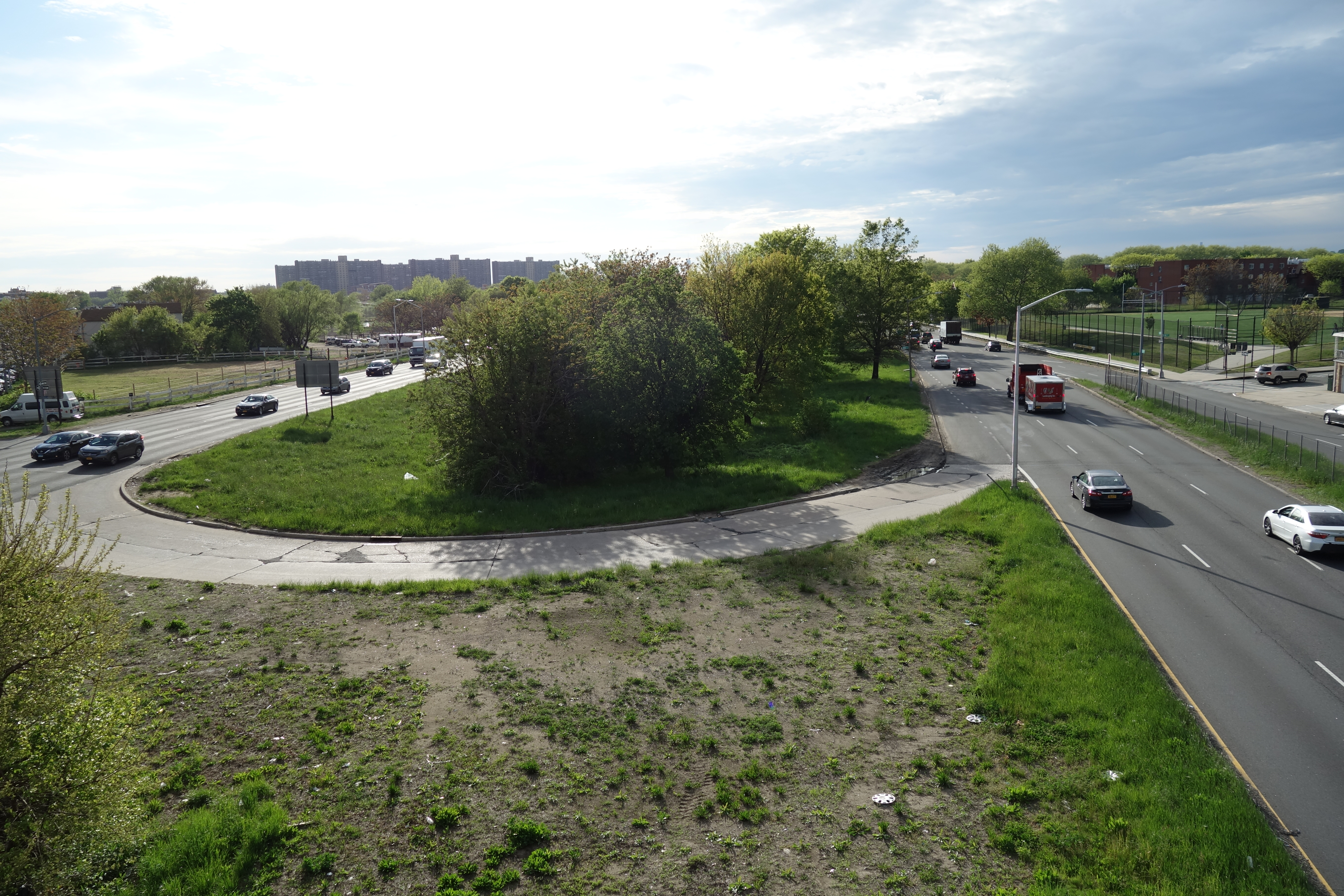
The median of Conduit Avenue (pictured, at 88th Street) would have been used for the Bushwick Expressway.

Around 1954, officials proposed constructing the Bushwick Expressway as part of Interstate 78, between the Williamsburg Bridge and the Nassau Expressway (NY 878). The expressway would have followed Broadway, Bushwick Avenue, and the Conduit Boulevard/Avenue corridor within Brooklyn. The widened median of Conduit Boulevard would have facilitated the expressway. An alternate routing proposed in the 1960s by the Triborough Bridge and Tunnel Authority (TBTA) would have traveled slightly farther north, connecting to the Long Island Expressway (I-495) in western Queens. The Bushwick Expressway was opposed due to the destruction of residences and businesses in Brooklyn and Queens that would be required; the TBTA estimated that nearly 4,000 families would be displaced by the expressway. The Bushwick Expressway plan was later truncated and later dropped entirely in 1969. Governor Nelson Rockefeller eliminated the expressway from the state's construction plans in March 1971.

In 2000, NYC Parks published a report in which it proposed constructing a bikeway and horse trail within the large grassy median of Conduit Boulevard. The trails would be part of a greenway along the southern and eastern edges of Queens, running from East New York, Brooklyn, along the Laurelton Parkway and Cross Island Parkway to Bayside, Queens. The greenway itself had been proposed in the 1990s. However, as of 2017, the full greenway had not been constructed due to disagreements within the Howard Beach community. In 2025, the New York City Department of Transportation began studying safety upgrades to the westernmost 3 miles (4.8 km) of Conduit Avenue and Boulevard.
