= Clearview Interchange =

Highway interchange in Queens, New York

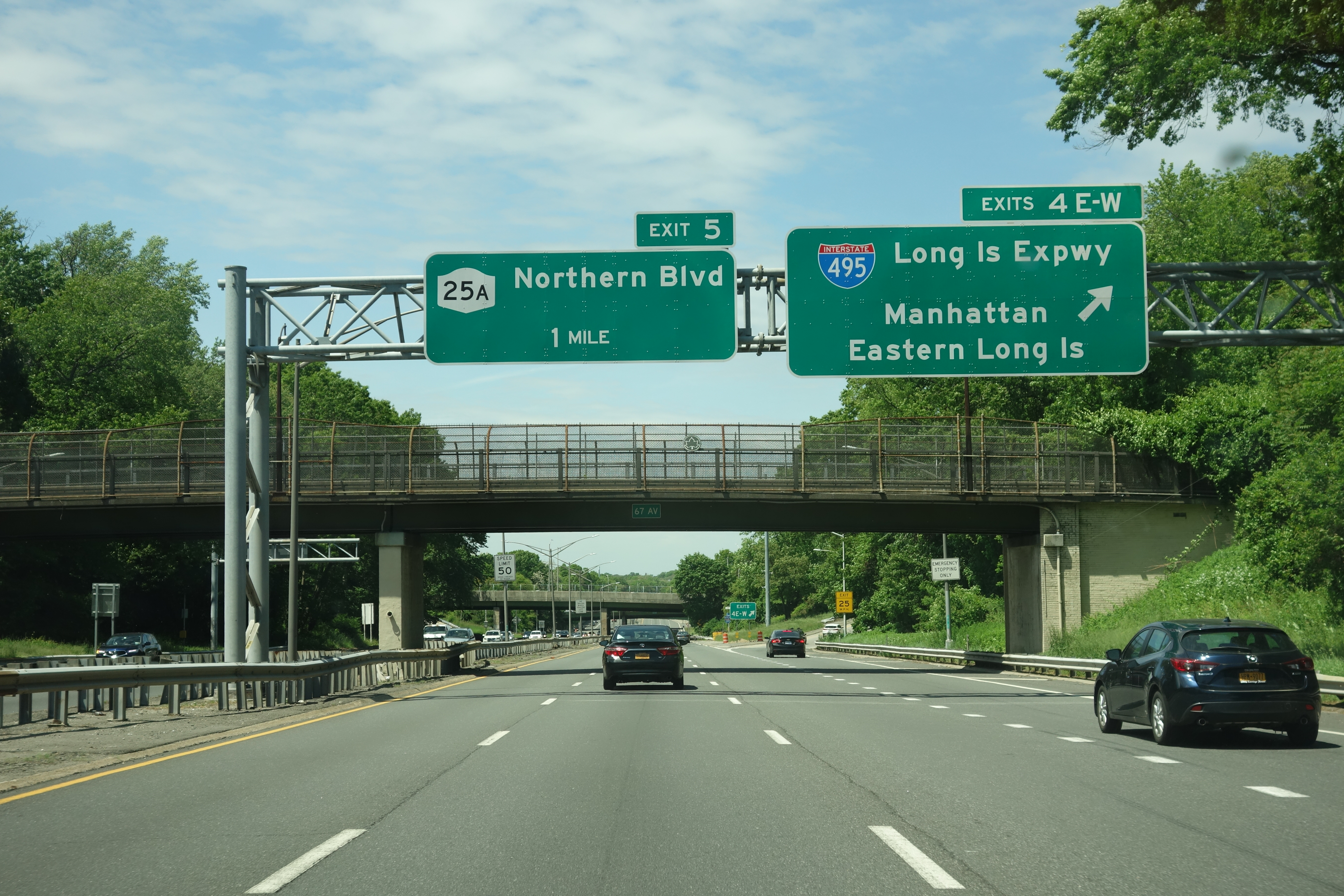
- Approaching the Clearview Interchange from the northbound Clearview Expressway
- Interactive map of Clearview Interchange

Location
- Bayside, Queens, New York
- Coordinates: 40°44′38.1″N 73°46′18.2″W
- Roads at junction: I-295 (Clearview Expressway); I-495 (Long Island Expressway)

Construction
- Type: Windmill interchange
- Constructed: January 1959 – August 1960
- Opened: August 12, 1960
- Reconstructed: 2001–2003
- Maintained by: NYSDOT

The Clearview Interchange (also known as the Long Island Expressway / Clearview Expressway Interchange) is a highway interchange located in the Bayside neighborhood of the borough of Queens, in New York City.

== Description ==
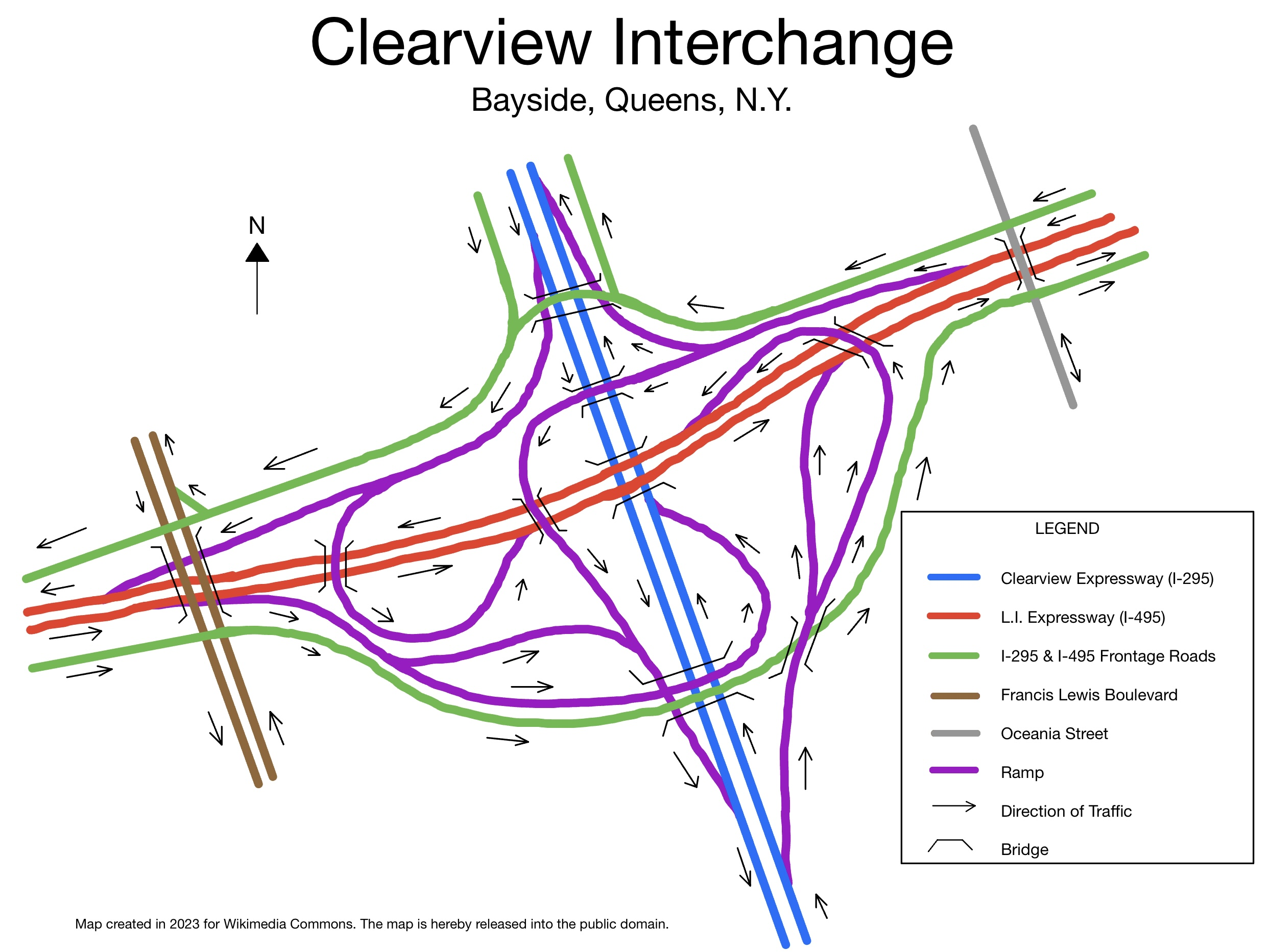
A diagram of the Clearview Interchange.

The interchange is a windmill interchange, connecting two major, controlled-access expressways: the Long Island Expressway (Interstate 495) and the Clearview Expressway (Interstate 295) – the latter highway being the interchange's namesake. The frontage roads for the Long Island Expressway curve around the interchange, in order to accommodate its ramps. The Long Island Expressway and its frontage roads travel above the Clearview Expressway, while the ramps connecting the two expressways travel above both the Long Island Expressway and its frontage roads.

Additionally, the Clearview Interchange forms the northern border of Cunningham Park.

== History ==
The Clearview Interchange was planned by Robert Moses when he planned the construction of the two highways through the area back in the 1950s. Construction on the interchange commenced in January 1959, and it opened on the afternoon of August 12, 1960. With the opening of the Clearview Interchange and the associated 0.9-mile (1.4 km) segment of the Long Island Expressway between Peck Avenue and 224th Street built as part of the project, the entirety of the Long Island Expressway within New York City was completed – along with the initial Interstate 495 designation for the highway (first designated in October 1958); the opening of the Long Island Expressway portion of the interchange closed a temporary, brief highway gap between the completed segments in Queens.

While the Long Island Expressway portions of the interchange had been officially opened and placed into service in 1960, the rest of the interchange would open shortly thereafter, upon the opening of the Clearview Expressway (then designated as a segment of Interstate 78) between the interchange and the Throgs Neck Bridge.

Upon opening the Clearview Interchange served as the eastern terminus of Interstate 495 – all portions of the expressway east of the interchange was designated as New York State Route 24, and then as New York State Route 495; the route east to Riverhead retained this designation until 1985, when the Interstate 495 designation was extended east to Riverhead.

The interchange was renovated in the 2000s. The $30 million project (equivalent to $51.3 million in 2024), known as the Long Island Expressway / Clearview Expressway Interchange Improvement Project, commenced in May 2001 and was completed on August 31, 2003.

== See also ==
- Bruckner Interchange, another interchange serving Interstate 295, located at the Interstate's northern end in The Bronx
- Kew Gardens Interchange, another interchange in Queens
