= List of Interstate Highways in New York =

- Standard Interstate shields in New York
- Interstate Highways highlighted in red

Highway names
- Interstates: Interstate X (I-X)
- US Highways: U.S. Route X (US X)
- State: New York State Route X (NY X)

System links
- New York Highways; Interstate; US; State; Reference; Parkways

There are 30 Interstate Highways—9 main routes and 21 auxiliary routes—that exist entirely or partially in the U.S. state of New York, the most of any state. In New York, Interstate Highways are mostly maintained by the New York State Department of Transportation (NYSDOT), with some exceptions. Unlike in some other states, Interstate Highways in New York are not directly referenced by NYSDOT with their number; instead, the letter "I" is suffixed to the number of the route on reference markers and in internal documents. On the surface, there appears to be numerical duplication between several Interstate Highways and state routes—such as I-86 (I-86) and NY 86—but the "I" suffix that is appended to Interstate Highway numbers allows the Interstate Highway and state route to co-exist ("86I" versus "86", respectively).

There are a combined 1,673 miles (2,692 km) of Interstate Highways within New York, which handles about 19 percent of vehicle travel in New York. At approximately 0.50 miles (0.80 km), I-78 is the shortest main Interstate Highway, while I-90 is the longest, spanning 385.88 miles (621.01 km) within New York. I-878, located in Queens, is the shortest active route in the Interstate Highway System at 0.7 miles (1.13 km).

Small portions of I-278 in New York City are maintained by local authorities rather than the state transportation agency. In addition, parts of I-87, I-287, I-90, I-190, and I-95 are part of the New York State Thruway system and thus are maintained by the New York State Thruway Authority.

== Main routes ==
Number	Length (mi)	Length (km)	Southern or western terminus	Northern or eastern terminus	Formed	Removed	Notes
I-78	0.50	0.80	I-78 at the New Jersey state line in Manhattan	Canal Street in Manhattan	1961	current	I-78 crosses the Hudson River from New Jersey via the Holland Tunnel and ends at the tunnel plaza in Lower Manhattan.
I-81	183.67	295.59	I-81 at the Pennsylvania state line in Kirkwood	Canadian border at Thousand Islands	1957	current	I-81 crosses the Pennsylvania state line south of Binghamton and heads through central New York and the North Country to the Thousand Islands, where it becomes Ontario Highway 137 at the Canada–US border. Along the way, I-81 passes through the cities of Syracuse and Watertown.
I-84	71.46	115.00	I-84 at the Pennsylvania state line in Port Jervis	Connecticut state line at Southeast	1957	current	I-84 crosses the New York–Pennsylvania state line near the point where New York, Pennsylvania, and New Jersey meet in the vicinity of Port Jervis. It heads generally east–west across Orange, Dutchess and Putnam counties to the Connecticut state line east of Brewster.
I-86	216.23	347.99	I-86 at the Pennsylvania state line in Mina I-86 at the Pennsylvania state line in Waverly I-81/NY 17/NY 990G in Kirkwood	I-86 at the Pennsylvania state line in Waverly NY 17/NY 26 in Vestal NY 17/NY 79 in Windsor	1999	current	Gap between US 220 and I-81. I-86, known as the Southern Tier Expressway, heads east–west across the Southern Tier from the Pennsylvania state line west of Findley Lake to NY 352 east of downtown Elmira. A second section of I-86 exists in central Broome County, occupying part of a divided highway known as the Quickway. Both pieces of I-86 will eventually be part of a continuous route extending from Erie, Pennsylvania, to Harriman. The I-86 designation is being extended eastward as improvements are made to the existing NY 17 highway.
I-87	333.66	536.97	I-278 in The Bronx	Canadian border at Champlain	1957	current	I-87 extends from The Bronx approach to the Triborough Bridge in New York City to the Canada–US border near Champlain, where it connects with Quebec Autoroute 15, the Decarie Expressway of Montreal. The portion of I-87 from the New York City line to Albany is part of the New York State Thruway mainline; at Albany, I-87 leaves the Thruway and becomes the Adirondack Northway. Aside from Albany, I-87 also serves Kingston NY, Glens Falls, and Plattsburgh.
I-88	117.38	188.90	I-81 in Chenango	I-90/New York State Thruway in Rotterdam	1968	current	I-88 serves as a connector between I-81 near Binghamton and the New York State Thruway (I-90) near Schenectady. It parallels NY 7 between the two cities and passes through the city of Oneonta.
I-90	386.59	622.16	I-90 at the Pennsylvania state line in Ripley	I-90/Mass Pike at the Massachusetts state line in Canaan	1957	current	I-90 travels from the Pennsylvania state line at Ripley to the Massachusetts border at Canaan. The vast majority of I-90 in New York is part of the New York State Thruway system; the only segment that is not part of the system is a 20-mile (32 km) portion in the city of Albany and its eastern suburbs. Aside from Albany, I-90 also serves Buffalo, Rochester (via I-490), Syracuse, and Utica.
I-90N	27.75	44.66	I-90/New York State Thruway in Buffalo	Canadian border at Lewiston	1957	1959	I-90N was the original designation for what is now I-190 in western New York. It was renumbered to I-190 in 1959.
I-95	23.47	37.77	I-95/US 1/US 9/US 46 at the New Jersey state line in Manhattan	I-95/Connecticut Turnpike at the Connecticut state line in Port Chester	1957	current	I-95 extends from the George Washington Bridge over the Hudson River (where it crosses from New Jersey into New York City) to the Connecticut state line at Port Chester. It passes through New York City on the Trans-Manhattan and Cross Bronx Expressways. The portion of I-95 from the Pelham Parkway in the Bronx to the Connecticut state line is known as the New England Thruway and is part of the New York State Thruway system.
I-99	12.89	20.74	I-99/US 15 at the Pennsylvania state line in Lindley	I-86/US 15/NY 17 in Painted Post	2014	current	I-99 runs north from Pennsylvania along US 15 to I-86 near Corning.
Former

== Auxiliary routes ==
Number	Length (mi)	Length (km)	Southern or western terminus	Northern or eastern terminus	Formed	Removed	Notes
I-190	28.68	46.16	Buffalo	Canadian border at Lewiston	1959	current	I-190 is a spur connecting the New York State Thruway (I-90) at exit 53 near Buffalo to the Canada–United States border at Lewiston, north of Niagara Falls. The portion of I-190 south of NY 384 is part of the New York State Thruway system. I-190 is the only three-digit Interstate Highway that reaches the Canadian border.
I-278	33.77	54.35	New Jersey line at Staten Island	The Bronx	c. 1960	current	I-278 crosses from New Jersey to New York by way of the Goethals Bridge over the Arthur Kill at Staten Island. It passes through all five boroughs of New York City (technically entering Manhattan when it passes over Wards Island on the Triborough Bridge) before coming to an end at the Bruckner Interchange in the Bronx.
I-281	9.45	15.21	Syracuse	DeWitt	c. 1963	1970	I-281 was a connector highway between I-81 and I-90 that passed through the southeastern suburbs of Syracuse. It was renumbered to I-481 in 1970, possibly to avoid confusion with NY 281, a highway that parallels I-81 some miles south of Syracuse.
I-287	30.84	49.63	New Jersey line at Suffern	Rye	c. 1960	current	I-287 crosses the New Jersey border into New York near Suffern and heads generally southeastward across Rockland and Westchester counties to I-95 in Rye. Most of I-287 in Rockland County overlaps with I-87 and all of I-287 east of Suffern is part of the New York State Thruway system.
I-290	10.67	17.17	Tonawanda	Amherst	c. 1962	current	I-290 is a connector between I-190 in the town of Tonawanda and the New York State Thruway (I-90) near Williamsville. It serves as a northern bypass of Buffalo.
I-295	9.77	15.72	Queens	The Bronx	1970	current	I-295 is a connector route within New York City. It travels from the Grand Central Parkway in Queens to the Bruckner Interchange in the Bronx. It crosses the East River by way of the tolled Throgs Neck Bridge.
I-390	76.36	122.89	Avoca	Gates	c. 1973	current	I-390 extends from the Southern Tier Expressway (I-86 and NY 17) in the Southern Tier town of Avoca to I-490 just west of Rochester. I-390 connects to I-90 (the New York State Thruway) in Henrietta, a southern suburb of Rochester.It continues north as NY 390.
I-478	2.41	3.88	Brooklyn	Manhattan	c. 1970	current	I-478's entire length consists of the Brooklyn–Battery Tunnel and its approaches. Its south end is at I-278, and its north end is at NY 9A.
I-481	15.14	24.37	Syracuse	North Syracuse	1970	2026	I-481 was a loop highway for I-81 that passed through the Syracuse suburbs of Jamesville and DeWitt along the way. It continued north as NY 481. I-81 replaced it in 2026, while the former I-81 is now I-81 Bus.
I-487	—	—	The Bronx	Beacon	—	—	I-487 was a proposed designation for the Hudson River Expressway, a highway that would have run through the Hudson Valley between the Bronx and Beacon. The project was cancelled by 1971.
I-490	37.53	60.40	Le Roy	Victor	c. 1961	current	I-490 is a loop route off the New York State Thruway (I-90) between the town of Le Roy and the town of Victor. I-90 bypasses the city of Rochester to the south while I-490 serves the city's suburbs and Rochester itself.
I-495	70.89	114.09	Manhattan	Riverhead	1958	current	I-495, better known as the Long Island Expressway or LIE, extends across Long Island from the western portal of the Queens Midtown Tunnel in Manhattan to Riverhead, Suffolk County. The 2017 route log shows that there is a gap in the designation between I-278 and I-678, where it is designated in between as NY 495, which is incorrect.
I-587	1.23	1.98	Kingston	Kingston	1960	current	I-587 is a short spur linking downtown Kingston to the New York State Thruway (I-87) at exit 19 northwest of the city. It is entirely concurrent with NY 28.
I-590	4.91	7.90	Brighton	Rochester	1980	current	I-590 serves as a connector between I-390 in Brighton and I-490 in Rochester (at the Can of Worms). It continues north as NY 590.
I-678	14.68	23.63	Queens	The Bronx	c. 1965	current	I-678 runs entirely within two boroughs of New York City: Queens and the Bronx. The highway begins at the John F. Kennedy International Airport and ends at the Bruckner Interchange in the Bronx.
I-684	28.47	45.82	White Plains	Southeast	1970	current	I-684 connects I-287 in White Plains to I-84 near Brewster. A small portion of the route is located in Connecticut.
I-687	4.6	7.4	Albany	Colonie	—	—	I-687 was a proposed designation for a connector between I-90 and I-87 in northern Albany. The expressway was never constructed due to a lack of funding. I-687 was removed from local and national highway plans in the 1970s. The I-687 designation is currently reserved.
I-690	14.18	22.82	Van Buren	DeWitt	c. 1962	current	I-690 travels southeast from exit 39 on the New York State Thruway (I-90) in Van Buren and passes through the western suburbs of Syracuse before heading east through the city itself and terminating in DeWitt, where it merges into I-481. I-690 serves the New York State Fairgrounds by way of exits 5–7. It continues north as NY 690.
I-695	1.77	2.85	The Bronx	The Bronx	1986	current	I-695 is a short connector route in the Bronx between I-295 (Cross Bronx Expressway) and I-95 (Bruckner Expressway) near the Throgs Neck Bridge.
I-781	4.52	7.27	Pamelia	Le Ray	2009	current	I-781 is a connector north of Watertown between I-81 and Fort Drum. It was completed in 2012.
I-787	9.96	16.03	Albany	Troy	c. 1965	current	I-787 is a spur leading from New York State Thruway exit 23 southwest of downtown Albany to the city of Troy north of Albany. In between, I-787 passes through downtown Albany.
I-790	2.06	3.32	Utica	Utica	c. 1961	current	I-790 is a short connector route linking downtown Utica to exit 31 of the New York State Thruway (I-90) northeast of the city.
I-878	0.70	1.13	Queens	Queens	1970	current	I-878 is an unsigned designation for the portion of NY 878 from I-678 (Van Wyck Expressway) east to the JFK Expressway. It is the shortest three-digit Interstate Highway in the Interstate Highway System. I-878 is not shown in the traffic logs.
I-890	8.80	14.16	Guilderland	Rotterdam	1962	current	I-890 is a loop route off the New York State Thruway (I-90) between Gilderland and Rotterdam. While the Thruway bypasses the city of Schenectady to the south, I-890 directly serves it.
I-895	1.35	2.17	The Bronx	The Bronx	1970	2017	I-895 was a short freeway in the Bronx, linking the Bruckner Expressway (I-278) to the Cross Bronx Expressway (I-95); renumbered as NY 895.
I-990	6.53	10.51	Amherst	Amherst	c. 1981	current	I-990 is a spur in the Buffalo suburb of Amherst that leads from I-290 to NY 263 in northern Erie County. It is the highest numbered route in the Interstate Highway System.
Former
