= Bruckner Expressway =

Highway in New York City

- Henry Bruckner Expressway
- Map of the Bronx in New York City with Bruckner Expressway highlighted in red

Route information
- Maintained by NYSDOT
- Length: 7.37 mi (11.86 km)
- Component highways: I-278 from Port Morris to Throggs Neck; I-95 from Throggs Neck to Pelham Bay Park

Major junctions
- West end: I-87 / I-278 Toll in Port Morris
- NY 895 in Hunts Point; Bronx River Parkway in Soundview; I-95 / I-295 / I-678 / Hutchinson River Parkway in Throggs Neck
- North end: I-95 / Pelham Parkway / Shore Road in Pelham Bay Park

Location
- Country: United States
- State: New York

Highway system
- New York Highways; Interstate; US; State; Reference; Parkways

The Bruckner Expressway is a freeway in the borough of the Bronx in New York City. It carries Interstate 278 and Interstate 95 from the Triborough Bridge to the south end of the New England Thruway at the Pelham Parkway interchange. The highway follows a mostly northeast–southwest alignment through the southern portion of the borough, loosely paralleling the course of the East River. It connects to several major freeways including the Bronx River Parkway, the Cross Bronx Expressway, Interstate 678, and the Hutchinson River Parkway.

== Route description ==
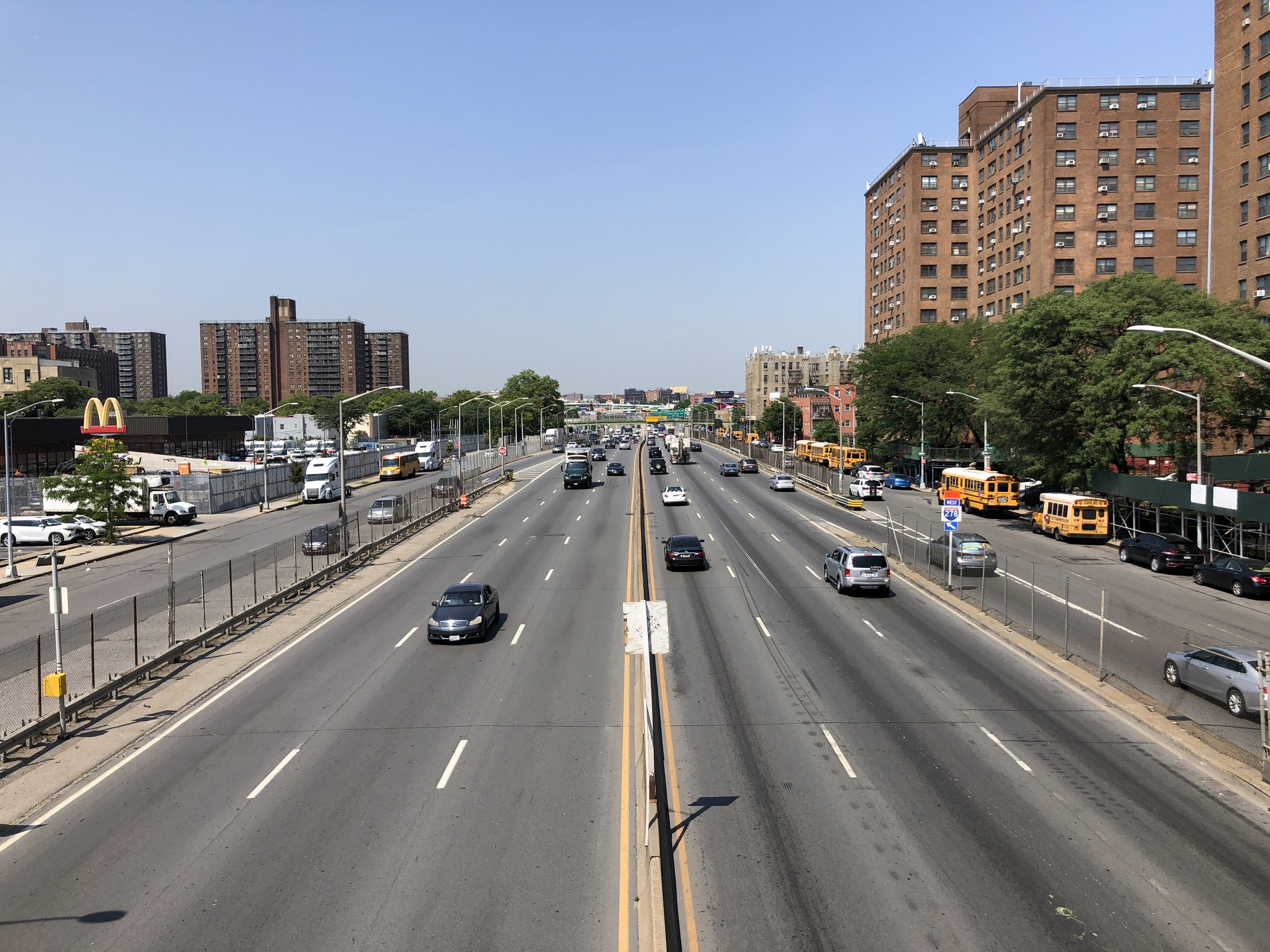
Westbound I-278 (Bruckner Expressway) at Stratford Avenue in the Bronx

The expressway begins at the northern approach to the Triborough Bridge, where I-278 meets the southern end of I-87, here known as the Major Deegan Expressway. It heads to the northeast as an elevated highway, carrying the I-278 designation through the South Bronx. After 2 miles (3.2 km), the Bruckner Expressway meets NY 895 (Sheridan Boulevard) and turns eastward to cross the Bronx River into the Soundview neighborhood. Here, the highway connects to the Bronx River Parkway at an interchange one block north of that road's official southern terminus. The Bruckner Expressway remains I-278 into the adjacent neighborhood of Castle Hill, where I-278 enters the west half of the complicated Bruckner Interchange and I-95 transitions from the Cross Bronx Expressway to the Bruckner.

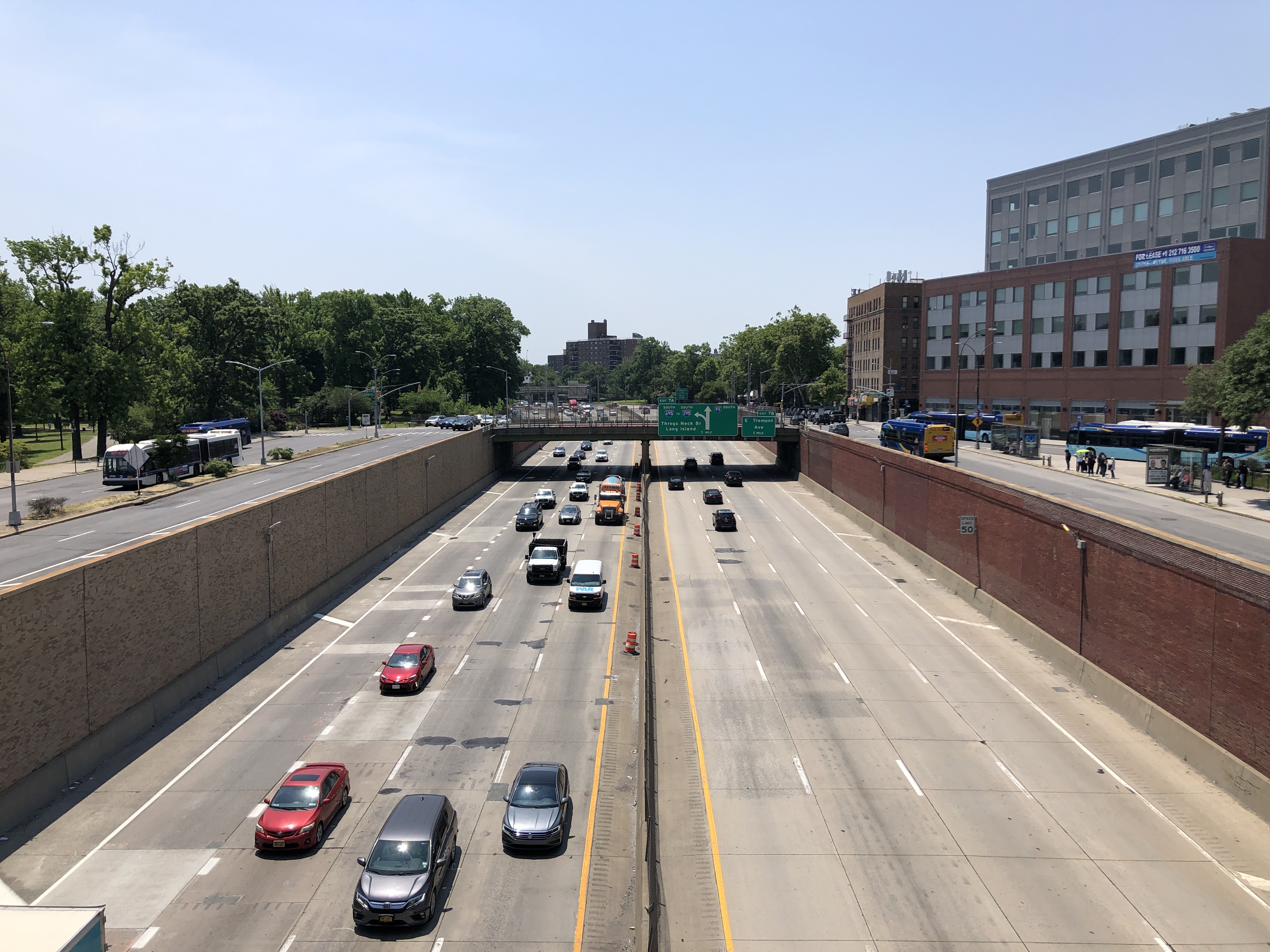
Southbound I-95 (Bruckner Expressway) at Westchester Avenue adjacent to Pelham Bay Park

In the east half of the junction, located on the opposite bank of Westchester Creek in Throggs Neck, the Bruckner Expressway (now designated I-95) intersects the Hutchinson River Parkway, I-295, and I-678. I-295 proceeds southeast from the Bruckner Interchange as the Cross Bronx Expressway, while the Hutchinson Parkway and I-678 head to the north and south, respectively. The Bruckner eventually makes a turn to the north as well, connecting with I-695 in the process. The Hutchinson and the Bruckner follow mostly parallel alignments to Pelham Bay Park, where the Bruckner Expressway ends at an interchange with the Pelham Parkway. I-95 continues north from this point as the New England Thruway.

== History ==
The Bruckner Expressway was a project envisioned by Robert Moses, who steered the Bruckner through the Soundview section of the Bronx, further altering the neighborhood after the 15-year construction of the Cross Bronx Expressway, which was completed in 1963. The Bruckner Expressway itself was completed in 1973, making it one of the last roads of the New York City Expressway system to be built. It is named in honor of former Bronx Borough President and Congressman, Henry Bruckner (1871–1942), and was built on and over the roadway of Bruckner Boulevard (originally called Eastern Boulevard).

Unlike the Cross Bronx Expressway, which cut through the existing street grid, the Bruckner Expressway was built along the Bruckner Boulevard alignment (except at its western end, where the Bruckner Expressway and Major Deegan Expressway meet). Between Sheridan Boulevard and the eastern end of the Bruckner Expressway, the Bruckner Boulevard is the service road, except at the Bruckner Interchange, where Bruckner Boulevard passes underneath the flying junction. West of Sheridan Boulevard, Bruckner Boulevard is underneath the expressway, and extends past the expressway's western terminus for about 0.5 miles (0.80 km), ending under the Third Avenue Bridge.

In 2019, the New York State Department of Transportation began a $1.1 billion project to rebuild parts of the Bruckner Expressway and improve traffic flow, which would reduce air and noise pollution. The project would rebuild the interchanges with both Sheridan Boulevard and Hunts Point Avenue, add a third lane in both directions of the Bruckner, and rebuild four bridges.

== Exit list ==
The mileposts below follow actual signage, even though the route is continuous. The entire route is in the New York City borough of the Bronx.

Location	mi	km	Old exit	New exit	Destinations	Notes
Port Morris	28.89	46.49		–	I-278 Toll west (RFK Bridge) – Manhattan, Queens, Randalls Island	Continuation west; western end of I-278 concurrency
Port Morris	28.89	46.49	44	47	I-87 north (Major Deegan Expressway) – Albany	Southern terminus of I-87; former NY 1B
Port Morris	29.49	47.46	45	48	East 138th Street	Eastbound exit and entrance
Hunts Point				48	Leggett Avenue – Hunts Point Market	Westbound exit and entrance
Hunts Point	30.78	49.54	46	49	NY 895 north (Sheridan Boulevard) to East 177th Street	Eastbound exit and westbound entrance; southern terminus of NY 895; former I-895
Hunts Point	31.18	50.18		50	Tiffany Street	Westbound exit and eastbound entrance
Bronx River			Eastern Boulevard Drawbridge			
Soundview	31.48	50.66		51	Bronx River Avenue	Westbound exit only
Soundview	31.58	50.82	51	52	Bronx River Parkway north – White Plains	No westbound exit; exits 2E-W on Bronx River Parkway
Soundview	32.35	52.06	52	53	White Plains Road / Castle Hill Avenue	
Throggs Neck (Bruckner Interchange)				54	I-295 south / I-678 south / Hutchinson River Parkway north / Zerega Avenue – Throgs Neck Bridge, Whitestone Bridge	Eastbound exit and westbound entrance; exit 12 on I-295; exit 19W on I-678; exit 1A on Hutchinson Parkway
Throggs Neck (Bruckner Interchange)	33.62 6.02	54.11 9.69	12	6B	I-95 south / I-678 south / Bruckner Boulevard – George Washington Bridge, Whitestone Bridge I-278 ends	Southbound exit and northbound entrance; southern end of I-95 concurrency; eastern terminus of I-278
Schuylerville	7.40– 7.70	11.91– 12.39	13	7A	I-695 south to I-295 south – Throgs Neck Bridge	Southbound exit and northbound entrance; northern terminus of I-695
Schuylerville	7.40– 7.70	11.91– 12.39	14	7B	East Tremont Avenue	Southbound exit only
Country Club	7.40– 7.70	11.91– 12.39	15	7C	Country Club Road – Pelham Bay Park	Northbound exit and entrance
Country Club	8.40	13.52	16	8A	Westchester Avenue	No northbound exit
Pelham Bay Park	8.66	13.94	17-18	8	Pelham Parkway west – Orchard Beach, City Island	Signed as exits 8B (Orchard Beach) and 8C (Pelham) southbound; access to Orchard Beach via Shore Road; former NY 1B
Pelham Bay Park	8.66	13.94		–	I-95 north (New England Thruway) – New Haven	Continuation north; northern end of I-95 concurrency
1.000 mi = 1.609 km; 1.000 km = 0.621 mi: Concurrency terminus; Electronic toll collection; Incomplete access
