= Westchester Creek =

Urban stream in the Bronx, New York

Coordinates: 40°49′24″N 73°50′24″W

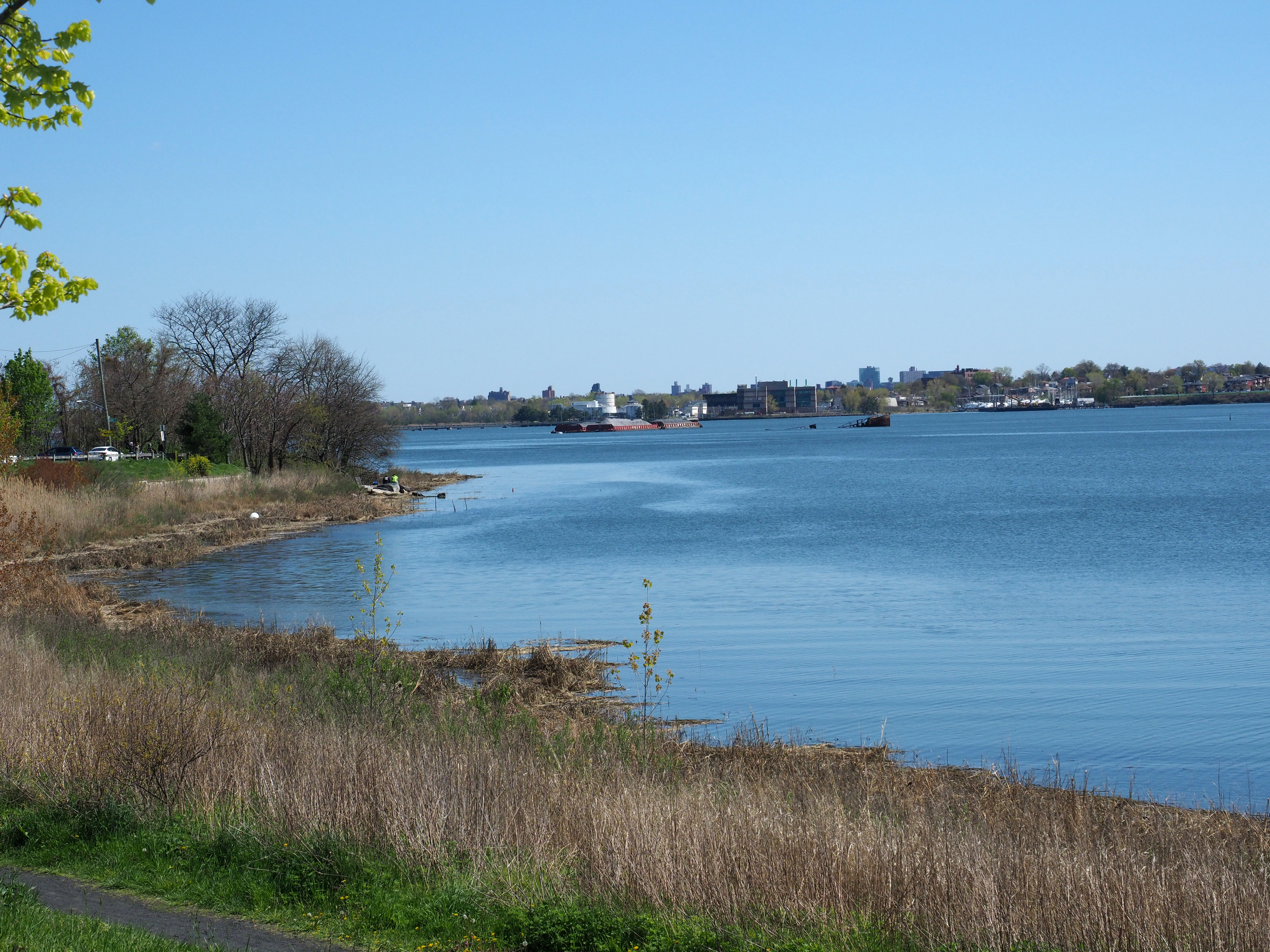
Westchester Creek, looking north-east from Clason Point Park

Westchester Creek (also known as Frenchman's Creek) is a tidal inlet of the East River located in the south eastern portion of the Bronx in New York City. It is 2.1 miles (3.39 km) in length. The creek formerly traveled further inland, to what is now Pelham Parkway, extending almost to Eastchester Bay and making Throggs Neck into an island during heavy storms. However, much of the route has been filled in, replaced by such structures as the New York City Subway's Westchester Yard and the Hutchinson Metro Center. Westchester Creek's present-day head is at Herbert H. Lehman High School; the remaining portion is largely inaccessible and surrounded by industrial enterprises or empty lots. Westchester Creek is traversed by the Bruckner Interchange at about its midpoint.

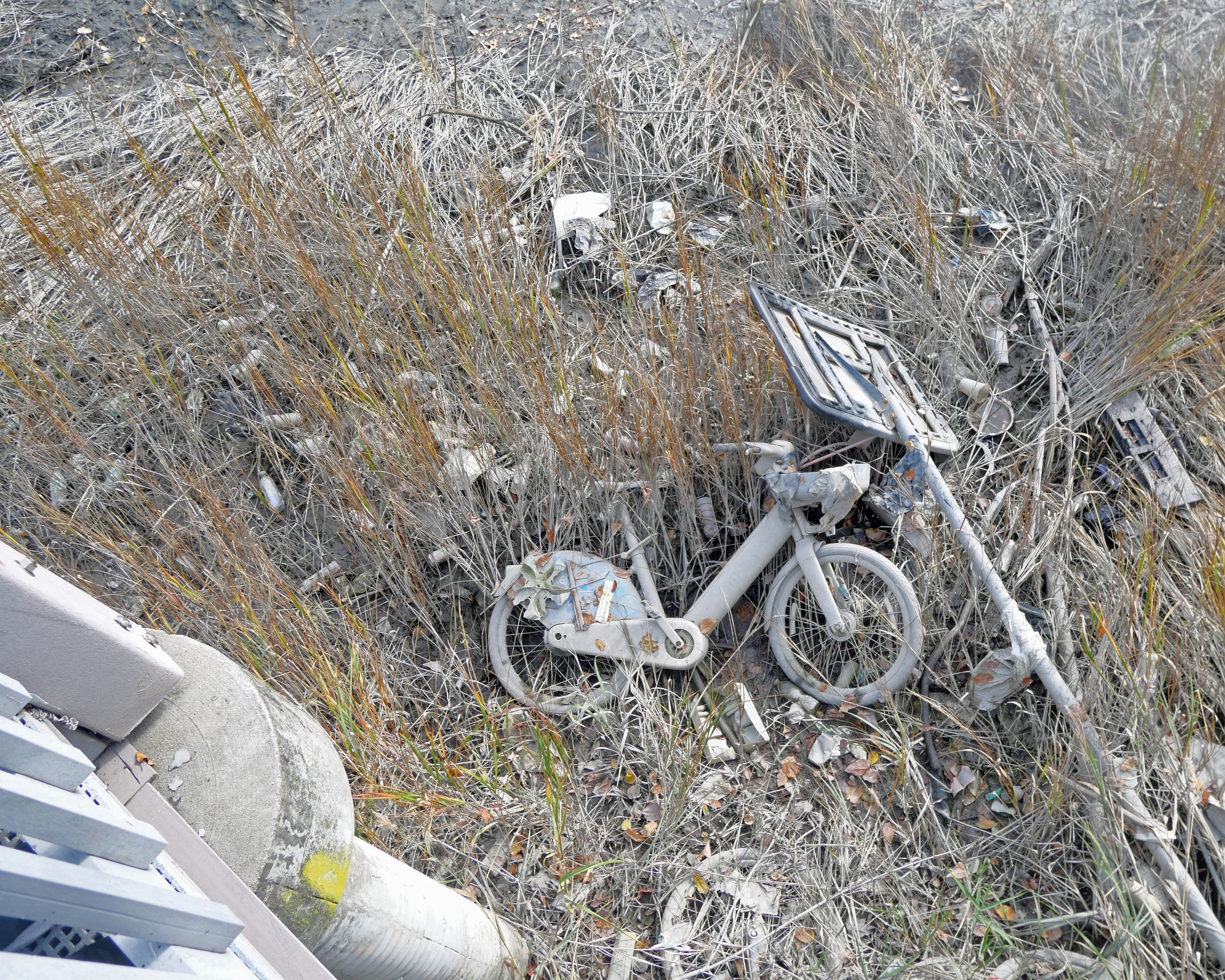
Wrecked bicycle in Pugsley Creek, 2023

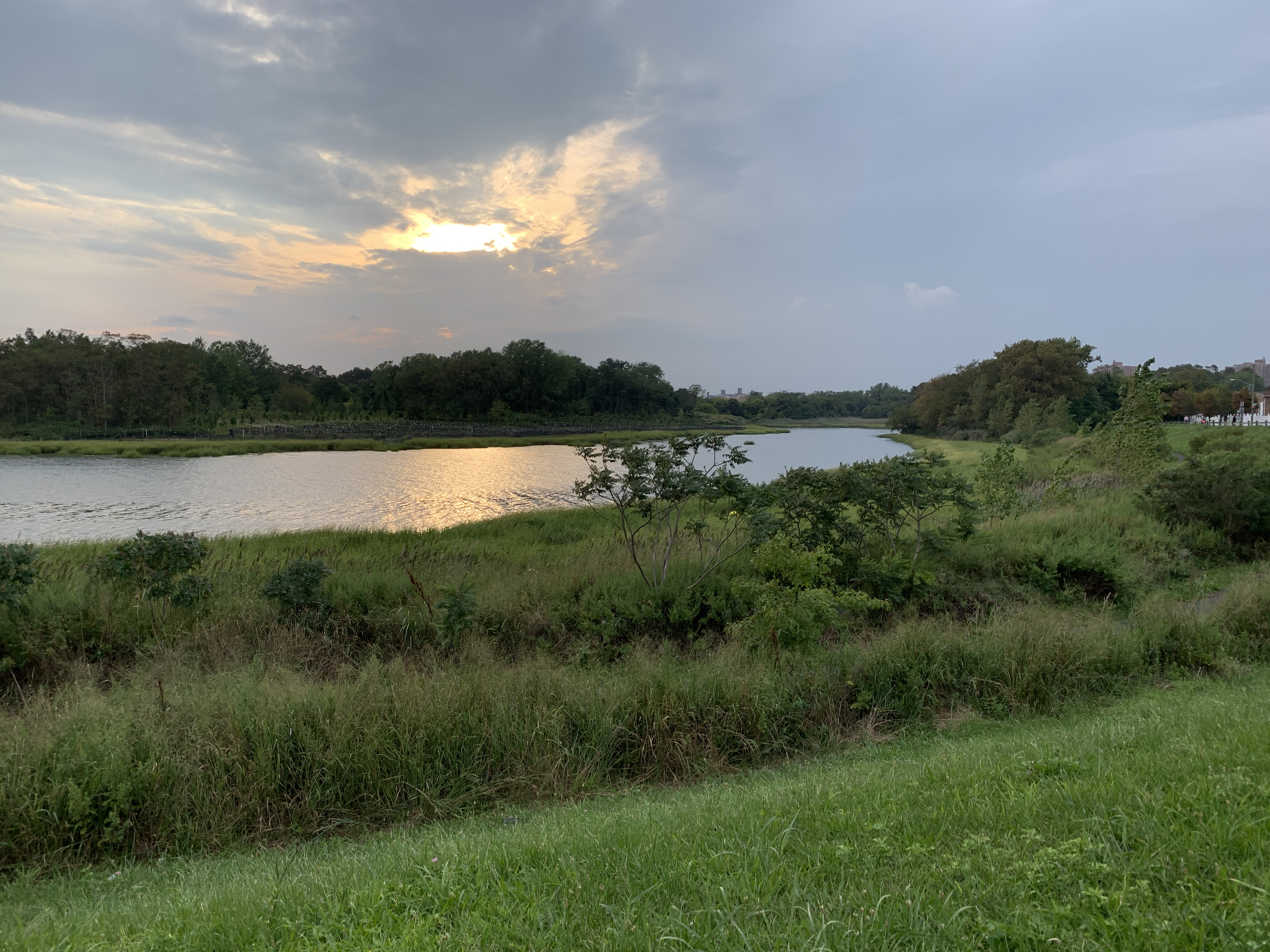
Castle Hill and Pugsley Creek Parks looking northwest from Howe Avenue, 2020

Pugsley Creek, historically known as Maenippis Kill and Cromwell's Creek, is a right bank tributary of Westchester Creek and is surrounded by a park of the same name. The creek formerly extended north to Westchester Avenue, but was later truncated to Bruckner Expressway and then to its current terminus at Lacombe Avenue. Most of the former creekbed has been developed, though a single block of Bolton Avenue on the creek's path remains undeveloped.

Ferry Point Park is on the east bank.

The film Bristol Fashion (2022) was filmed primarily on Westchester Creek.

The first permanent European settlement in the Bronx, Westchester Square, was established in 1654 by Thomas Pell and 15-20 settlers at the head of navigation of Westchester Creek. The creek's original headwaters was buried in the 1930s to make way for the construction of the Hutchinson River Parkway. A 30-slip marina called Metro Marine was built on the creek in 1957. The creek has become polluted over the years due to heavy industrial use. However, in 2014, the Friends of Ferry Point Park advocated for the plans to restore Westchester and Pugsley Creeks for $100 million.

== See also ==
- List of New York rivers
