= Interstate 295 (New York) =

Highway in New York

Interstate 295
- Map of the New York City area with I-295 highlighted in red

Route information
- Auxiliary route of I-95
- Maintained by NYSDOT and TBTA
- Length: 9.79 mi (15.76 km)
- History: Completed in 1963 as I-78; renumbered to I-295 on January 1, 1970
- NHS: Entire route
- Restrictions: No drivers with learner's permits on Throgs Neck Bridge

Major junctions
- South end: NY 24 / NY 25 / Grand Central Parkway in Cunningham Park
- I-495 in Fresh Meadows; NY 25A in Bayside; Cross Island Parkway in Bayside; I-695 in Throggs Neck
- North end: I-95 / I-278 / I-678 in Throggs Neck

Location
- Country: United States
- State: New York
- Counties: Queens, Bronx

Highway system
- Interstate Highway System; Main; Auxiliary; Suffixed; Business; Future; New York Highways; Interstate; US; State; Reference; Parkways
← NY 294	→ NY 295

Interstate 295 (I-295) is an auxiliary Interstate Highway within New York City. Measuring 7.7 miles (12.4 km) in length, I-295 originates at NY 25 (Hillside Avenue) in Queens, running north across Queens and over the tolled Throgs Neck Bridge, to Bruckner Interchange, a junction with I-95, I-278, I-678, and the Hutchinson River Parkway in the Bronx. From south to north, I-295 intersects the Grand Central Parkway, I-495 (Long Island Expressway), and the Cross Island Parkway in Queens before crossing the Throgs Neck Bridge and splitting with I-695 (Throgs Neck Expressway). In Queens, I-295 is also known as the Clearview Expressway, and in the Bronx, parts are known as the Throgs Neck Expressway and the Cross Bronx Expressway Extension.

The entirety of I-295 was proposed in 1955 as a part of I-78. Construction started in 1957, and the highway opened in 1963 with the I-78 designation. Originally, plans called for I-78 to be extended southeastward from the Holland Tunnel in Manhattan to NY 878 (Nassau Expressway) in Queens, before curving north to meet the Clearview Expressway. These plans were canceled in 1970, at which point the highway between NY 25 in Queens and I-95 in the Bronx was re-designated as I-295. I-295 was originally planned to continue further south to John F. Kennedy International Airport. The 2.5-mile (4.0 km) JFK Expressway, constructed in the 1980s, was intended to be part of I-295 but was constructed only as far north as the Belt Parkway.

== Route description ==
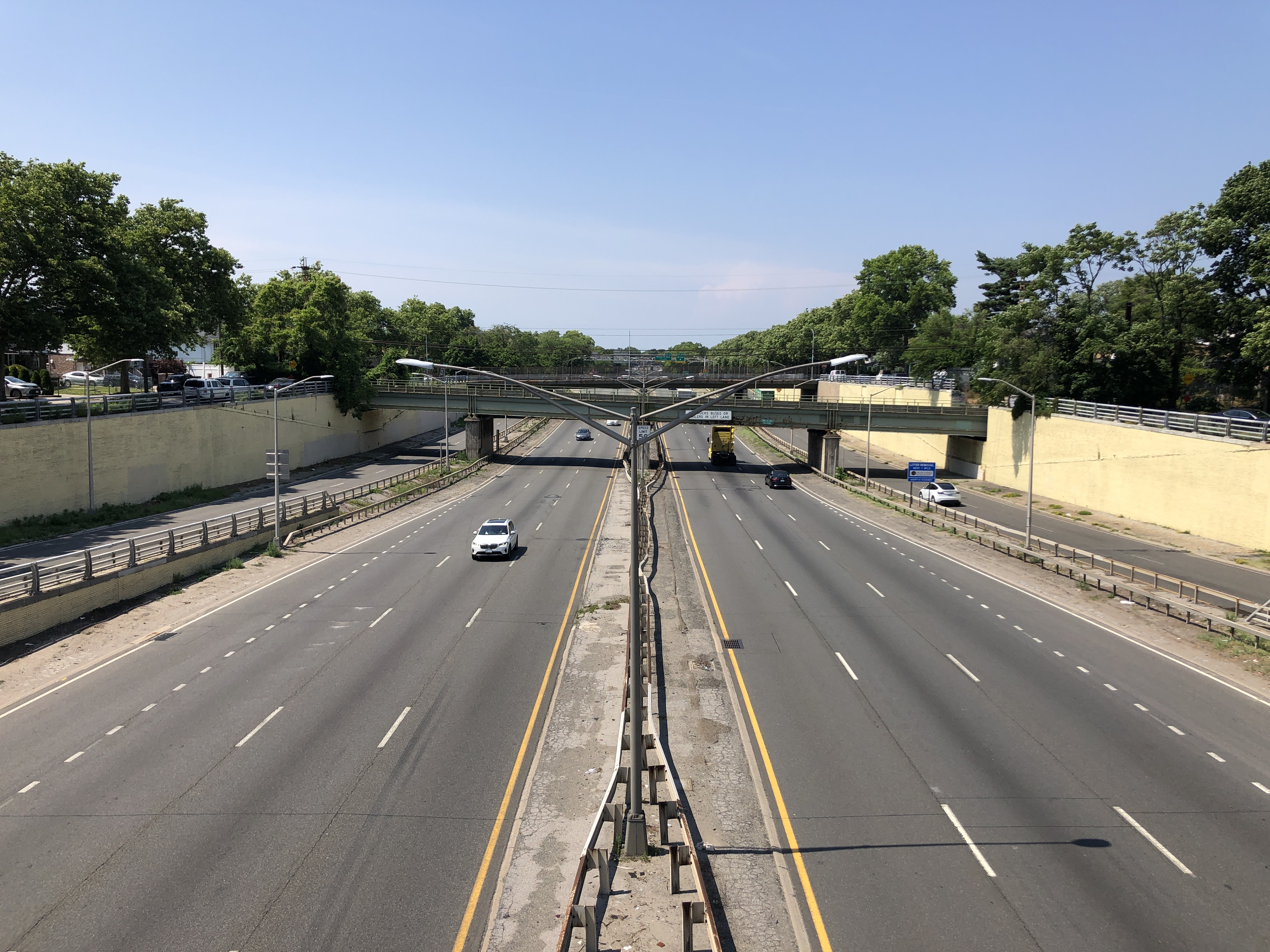
I-295 (Clearview Expressway) northbound at 42nd Avenue in northeastern Queens

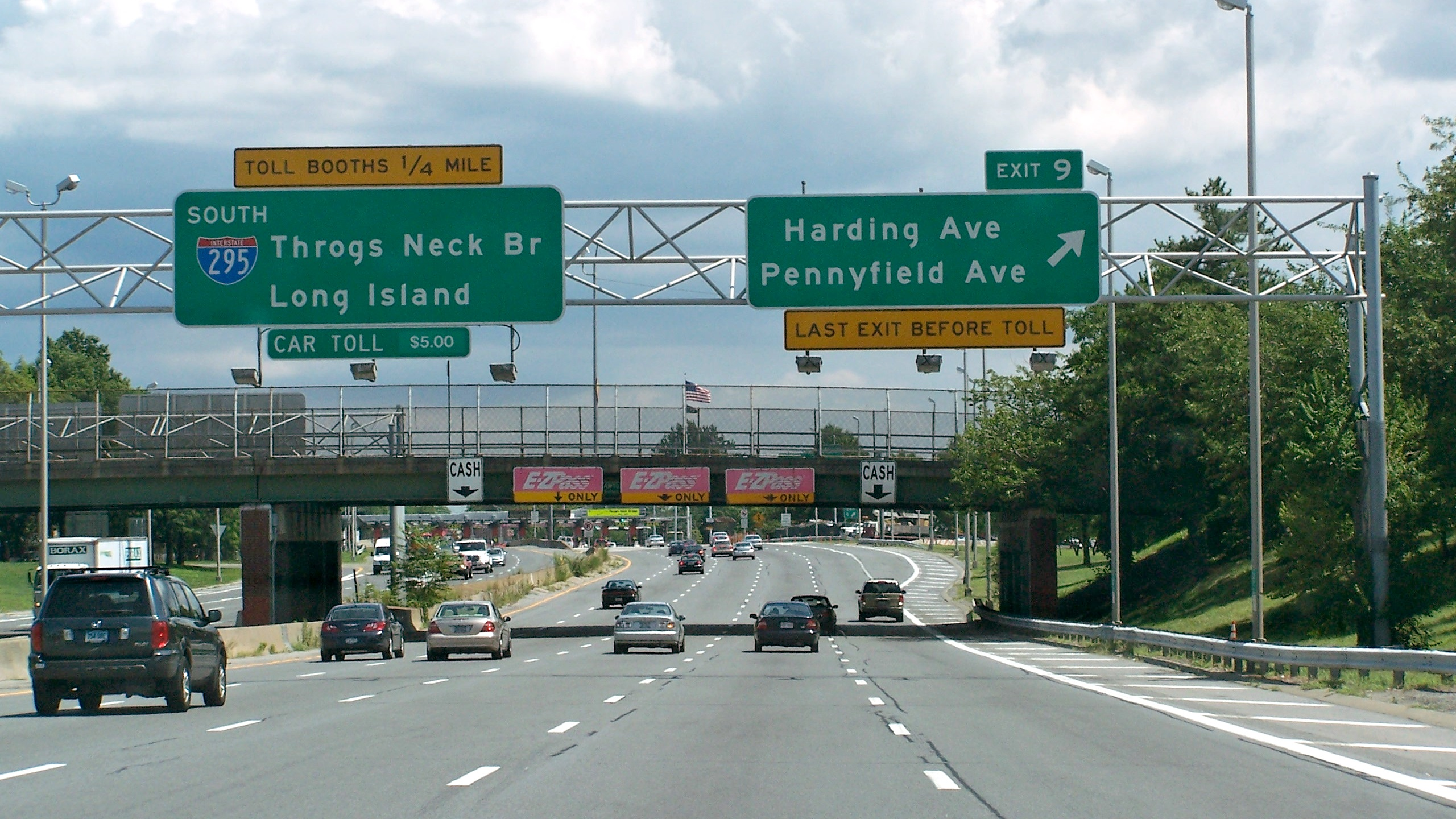
Southbound I-295 (Throgs Neck Expressway) nearing the Throgs Neck Bridge's former toll plaza.

The existing section of the Clearview Expressway that carries the I-295 designation begins at the unfinished interchange with NY 25 where the ramps from westbound NY 24 (212th Street) and eastbound Hollis Court Boulevard merge into the northbound and southbound lanes, respectively, of the highway. The Queens section of this roadway is known as "The 77th Infantry Division Expressway". The Queens expressway instantly runs beneath a stack interchange with the Grand Central Parkway before immediately entering Cunningham Park. The Clearview Expressway leaves Cunningham Park at the Clearview Interchange, where it meets the Long Island Expressway (now I-495).

Shortly north of the I-495 interchange, the northbound offramp and southbound onramp at NY 25A split, then run under a pedestrian bridge that connects 46th Avenue. Other pedestrian bridges cross over the highway near 42nd Avenue and at 33rd Avenue. The northbound exit 5 uses 206th Street as a de facto service road, while 207th Street is used in the same way for the northbound onramps. Real service roads run beneath the Port Washington Branch of the Long Island Rail Road to connect NY 25A and 35th Avenue (exit 6A). The service roads merge into the expressway north of 26th Avenue (exit 6B).

The northbound partial interchange with Willets Point and Bell boulevards leads to Cross Island Parkway, while a southbound interchange leads to the southbound Cross Island Parkway, all before reaching the Throgs Neck Bridge. The expressway then crosses the bridge.

After the Throgs Neck Bridge toll gantry in the Bronx, I-295 briefly becomes part of the Throgs Neck Expressway. Just north of the tollbooth is northbound access to Harding and Pennyfield avenues. The exit is right next to the Y interchange with I-695, with the Throgs Neck Expressway following I-695 to northbound I-95. I-295 beyond I-695 then becomes part of the Cross Bronx Expressway. The only other interchange between there and the terminus is Randall Avenue.

I-295, running northwest, gains service roads for a mile until it finally ends at its parent route at the Bruckner Interchange, but only includes access to southbound I-95, and I-278.

== History ==
=== Planning ===
The Clearview Expressway, Throgs Neck Expressway and Cross Bronx Expressway Extension were proposed in 1955 by the Port Authority of New York and New Jersey (PANYNJ) and Triborough Bridge and Tunnel Authority (TBTA) as part of the PANYNJ's Joint Study of Arterial Facilities, in order to connect with the planned Throgs Neck Bridge. The Throgs Neck Expressway and Cross Bronx Expressway Extension was planned to connect the bridge to several highways at the Bruckner Circle (now the Bruckner Interchange), while the Clearview Expressway was intended to connect with Horace Harding Boulevard/Long Island Expressway in order to serve motorists from Long Island.

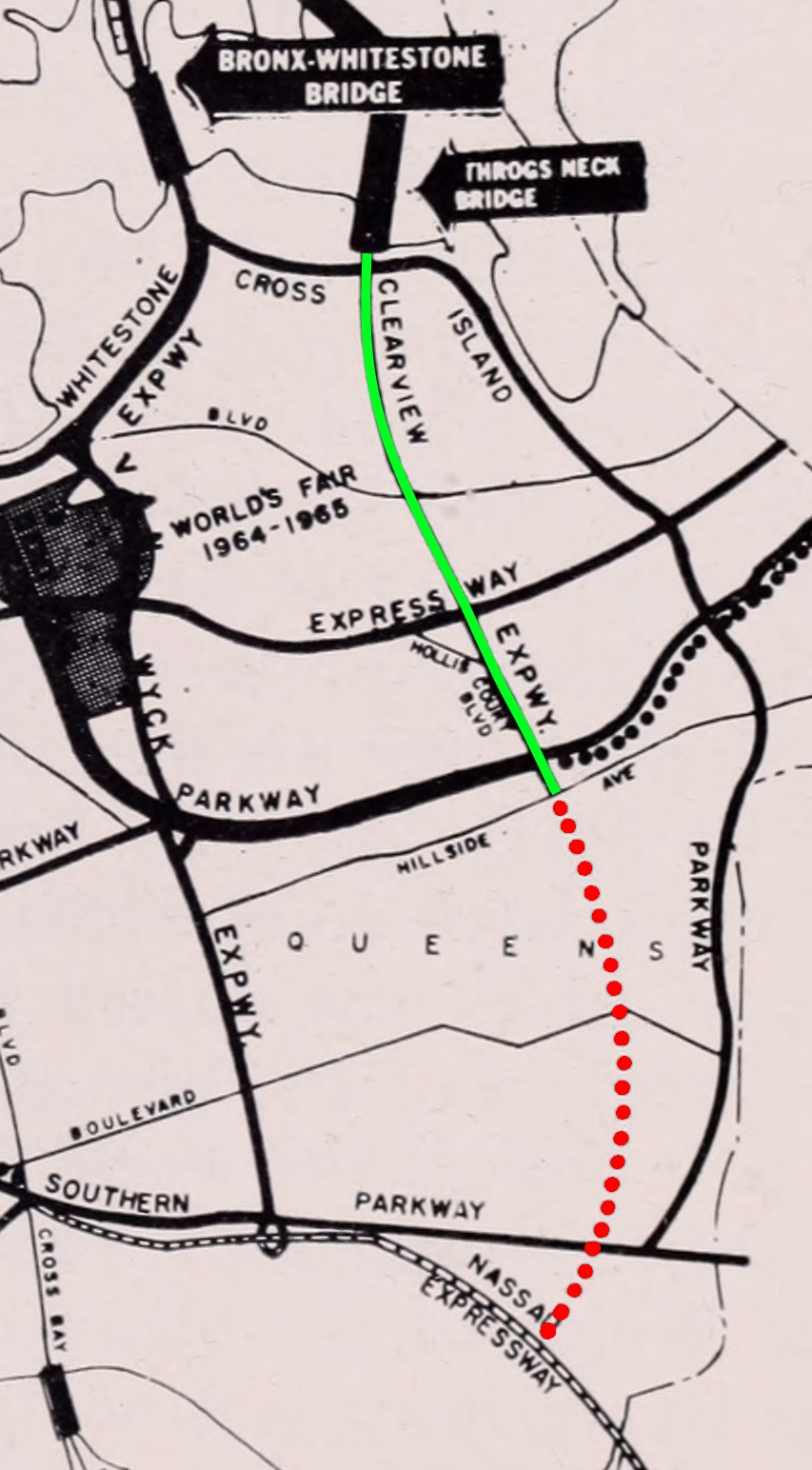
A 1964 highway map showing the completed section of the Clearview Expressway (green) and the unbuilt extension to the Nassau Expressway (red).

Initially, the Clearview Expressway was intended to run along the existing right-of-ways of Utopia Parkway and Francis Lewis Boulevard. An alternate proposed routing would have run along Little Neck Bay and through Alley Pond Park, essentially parallel to the Cross Island Parkway. By September 1956, the Clearview Expressway was mapped along 206th and 207th streets and Hollis Court Boulevard, east of Francis Lewis Boulevard, after community opposition. The reroute reduced the number of properties to be demolished or relocated from 860 to 421. An information center was set up by the TBTA for local residents displaced by the expressway.

The planning of the Clearview Expressway route by Robert Moses is documented in Robert Caro's biography of Moses, The Power Broker. A passage describes Moses and TBTA officials surveying potential routes for the highway in Queens, accidentally coming across protesters against the expressway. Caro writes that rather than being deterred by the protests, Moses "laughed and laughed" according to one aide's account.

=== Construction and opening ===
Construction on the Clearview Expressway and Throgs Neck Bridge began in September 1957. As part of the project, land was taken from Clearview Park, the defunct Bayside Golf Course, and Cunningham Park. Meanwhile, hundreds of homes were physically relocated from the path of the expressway. Many of these houses were placed in planned communities built on the sites of the Bayside Golf Course and the Oakland Country Club in Oakland Gardens. The Cross Bronx Expressway Extension, Throgs Neck Expressway, the Throgs Neck Bridge, and the portion of the Clearview Expressway north of 73rd Avenue in Queens were opened on January 11, 1961.

An extension of the Clearview south to Hillside Avenue (now NY 25) was opened to traffic on August 12, 1963. It was the first of several highways built to serve the 1964 New York World's Fair. Because of the steep hill at the end of the expressway leading to Hillside Avenue, the junction quickly became a frequent spot for accidents. This led to the implementation of a 40-mile-per-hour (64 km/h) speed limit at the end of the highway, which remains in effect. This section of the route is a notorious speed trap. The modern Bruckner Interchange was opened on January 4, 1972.

=== Post-opening ===
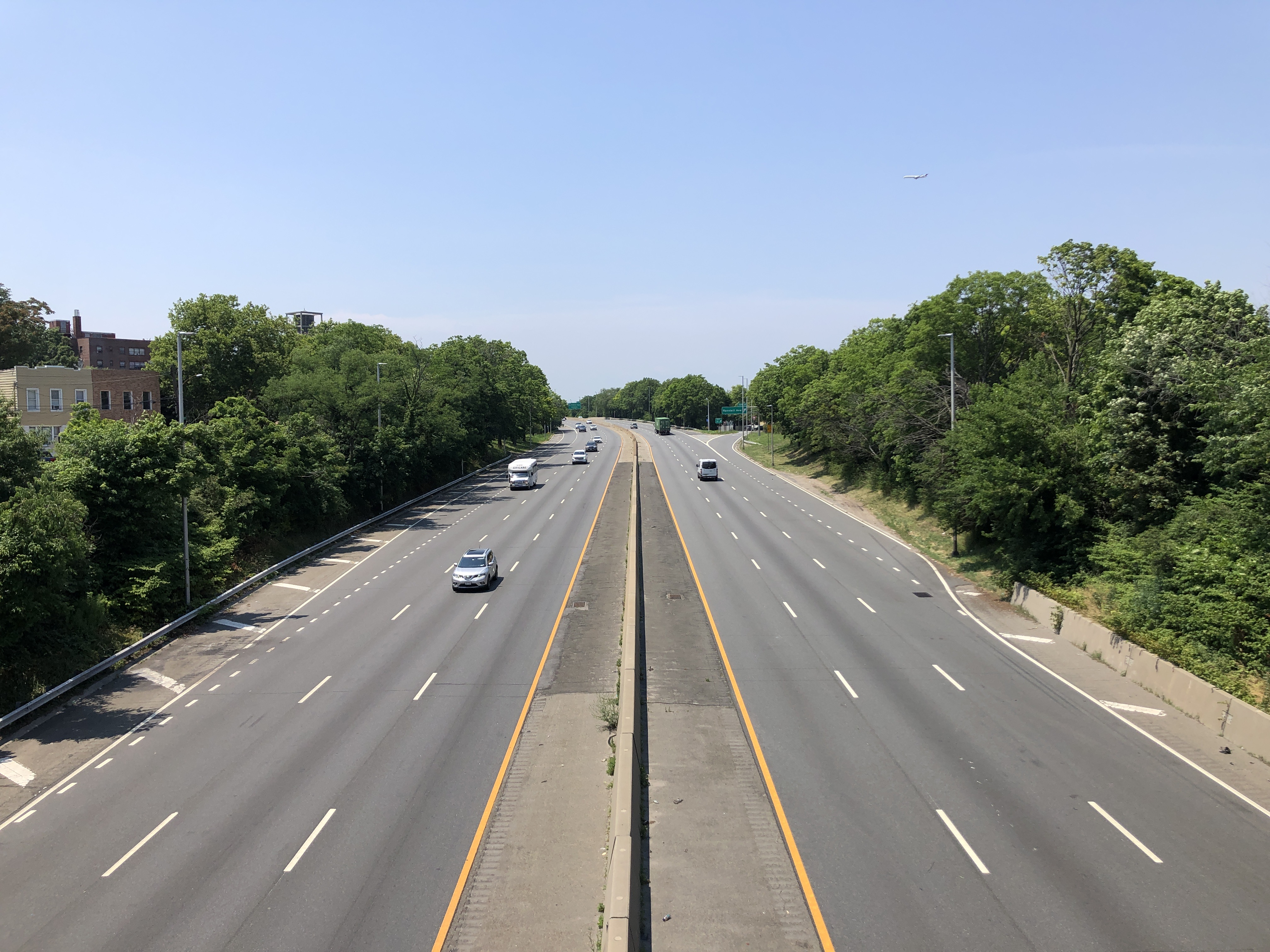
I-295 northbound (Cross Bronx Expressway Extension) at Dewey and East Tremont Avenues in the Bronx

The Cross Bronx Expressway Extension, Throgs Neck Expressway and the Clearview Expressway were originally designated as part of I-78, which was to continue south from Hillside Avenue through southeast Queens, and west across Queens, Brooklyn, and Manhattan to the Holland Tunnel. Under these plans, the Clearview would have been extended south to NY 27 (Conduit Avenue) and the Belt Parkway, or to the Nassau Expressway and Rockaway Boulevard, in Laurelton near John F. Kennedy International Airport. Later plans had the Clearview Expressway ending farther east, intersecting with the Belt Parkway at its interchange with the Southern State Parkway. A 1968 proposal from the Regional Plan Association had the Clearview Expressway extension running southeast along 212th Street/Hollis Court Boulevard and Hempstead Avenue, then south along the right-of-ways of the Cross Island and Belt parkways before ending at the Nassau Expressway. Ultimately, nearly all sections of I-78 between the Holland Tunnel and Hillside Avenue, including the Lower Manhattan Expressway, Bushwick Expressway, and the Clearview Expressway extension were canceled by Governor Nelson Rockefeller in 1971. The only portion to be constructed was the short section of the Nassau Expressway near John F. Kennedy International Airport. This resulted in the renumbering of all of I-78 north of Hillside Avenue to I-295 on January 1, 1970.

There have been proposals during the 21st century to extend the Clearview Expressway south to feed into the JFK Expressway via a tunnel. The JFK Expressway had been built as part of a costly overhaul of John F. Kennedy International Airport that began in the late 1980s. The JFK Expressway south of the Nassau Expressway and 150th Street was completed around 1986 and it was fully completed by 1991.

In February 2003, the Clearview Expressway was renamed "The 77th Infantry Division Expressway". The name honors the US Army's 77th Infantry Division of World War I and World War II fame. Raised from draftees from New York City and Long Island, the 77th was also known as the Statue of Liberty Division, due to its shoulder-sleeve insignia.

== Exit list ==
Borough	Location	mi	km	Exit	Destinations	Notes
Queens	Cunningham Park	0.00	0.00	–	NY 25 (Hillside Avenue) / Hollis Court Boulevard (NY 24 east)	Southern terminus; at-grade intersection
Queens	Cunningham Park	0.17	0.27	1	Grand Central Parkway – RFK Bridge, Eastern Long Island	Stack interchange; exit 21 on Grand Central Parkway
Queens	Cunningham Park	0.81	1.30	2	Union Turnpike	Former NY 25C
Queens	Cunningham Park	1.31	2.11	3	73rd Avenue	Southbound exit and northbound entrance
Queens	Fresh Meadows	1.70	2.74	4	I-495 (Long Island Expressway) – Manhattan, Eastern Long Island	Signed as exits 4E (east) and 4W (west); exits 27S-N on I-495
Queens	Fresh Meadows	2.70	4.35	5	NY 25A (Northern Boulevard)	Access to Flushing Hospital Medical Center
Queens	Bayside	3.30	5.31	6A	35th Avenue	Signed as exit 6 northbound
Queens	Bayside	4.20	6.76	6B	26th Avenue	Southbound exit and northbound entrance
Queens	Bayside	4.91	7.90	7	Willets Point Boulevard	Northbound exit and southbound entrance; last northbound exit before toll
Queens	Bayside	5.41	8.71	8	Cross Island Parkway south – Eastern Long Island	No northbound exit; exit 33 on Cross Island Parkway
East River		5.44– 7.31	8.75– 11.76	Throgs Neck Bridge (toll)		
The Bronx	Locust Point	7.71	12.41	9	Harding Avenue / Pennyfield Avenue – Fort Schuyler	Last southbound exit before toll
The Bronx	Throggs Neck	8.04	12.94	10	I-695 north to I-95 north – New Haven	Northbound exit and southbound entrance; southern terminus of I-695
The Bronx	Throggs Neck	8.81	14.18	11	Randall Avenue	
The Bronx	Throggs Neck			12	I-278 west (Bruckner Expressway) – Manhattan	Northbound exit and southbound entrance; eastern terminus and exit 54 on I-278 east
The Bronx	Throggs Neck	9.79	15.76	–	I-95 south (Cross Bronx Expressway) – George Washington Bridge, Newark, NJ	Northern terminus; exit 6B on I-95 north
1.000 mi = 1.609 km; 1.000 km = 0.621 mi: Electronic toll collection; Incomplete access
