= Interstate 695 (New York) =

Highway in New York

Interstate 695
- Throgs Neck Expressway
- Map of the Bronx in New York City with I-695 highlighted in red

Route information
- Auxiliary route of I-95
- Maintained by NYSDOT
- Length: 1.4 mi (2.3 km)
- Existed: 1986–present
- NHS: Entire route

Major junctions
- South end: I-295 in Throggs Neck
- North end: I-95 in Throggs Neck

Location
- Country: United States
- State: New York
- Counties: Bronx

Highway system
- Interstate Highway System; Main; Auxiliary; Suffixed; Business; Future; New York Highways; Interstate; US; State; Reference; Parkways
← NY 690	→ NY 695

Interstate 695 (I-695), also known as part of the Throgs Neck Expressway, is an auxiliary Interstate Highway in the New York City borough of the Bronx. It serves as a connector between I-95 (Bruckner Expressway) and I-295 (Cross Bronx Expressway/Throgs Neck Expressway) near the Throgs Neck Bridge, which connects the Bronx with Queens and Long Island.

== Route description ==
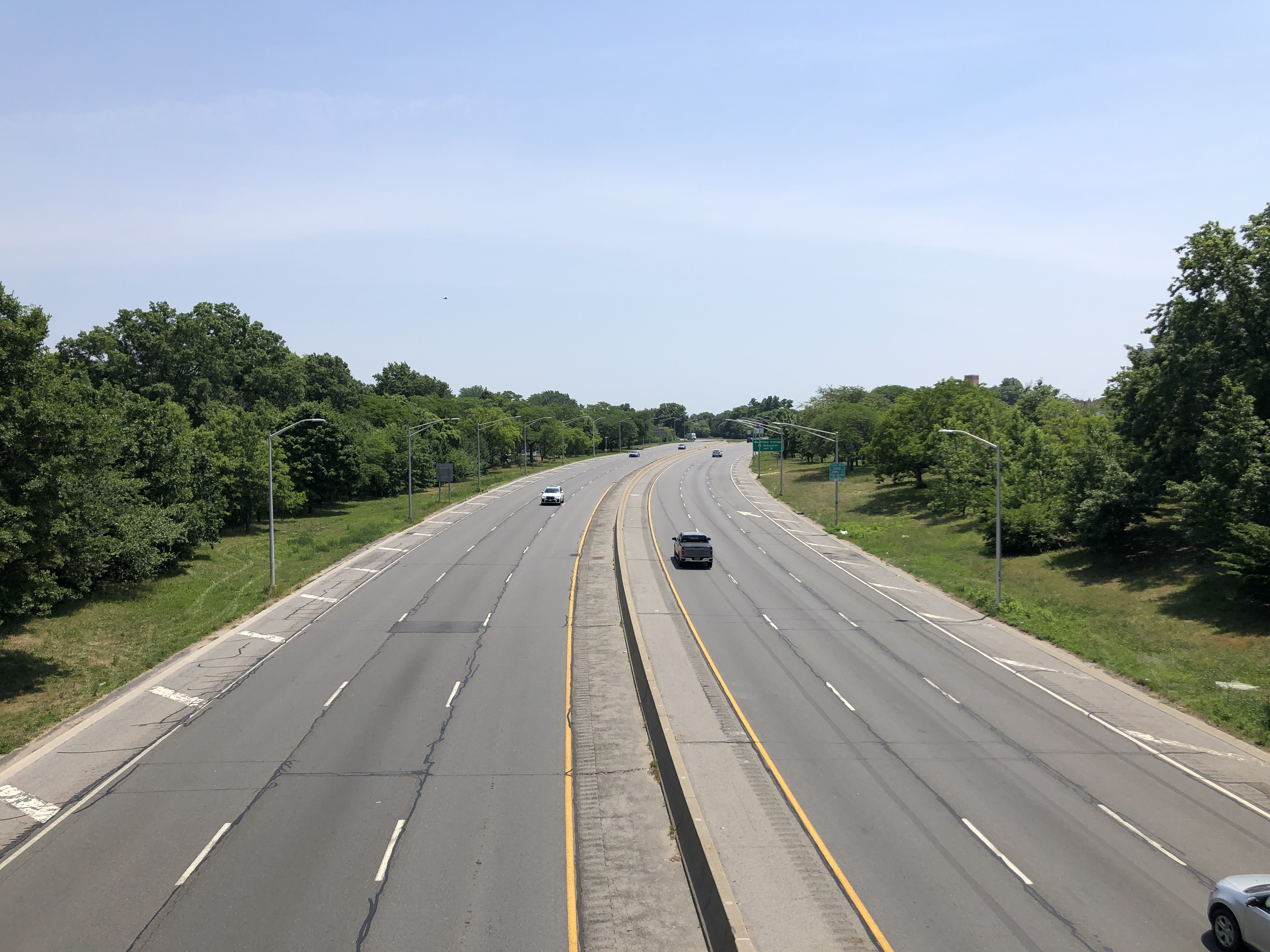
I-695 southbound approaching its southern terminus at I-295

I-695 begins at exit 10 on I-295 in the Throggs Neck section of the Bronx. Southeast of the intersection, the Throgs Neck Expressway follows I-295 to the Throgs Neck Bridge, while to the northwest, I-295 becomes the Cross Bronx Expressway. From I-295, I-695 carries the Throgs Neck Expressway to the northwest, passing through the western fringe of Weir Creek Park before descending into a cut and proceeding into Throggs Neck. Here, it connects to Randall Avenue (southbound) and Lafayette Avenue (northbound) as it makes its way northward. I-695 continues to the northern edge of the neighborhood, where it merges into the Bruckner Expressway (I-95) at its exit 7A.

== History ==
The Throgs Neck Expressway was completed in 1961 at a cost of $16 million (equivalent to $132 million in 2025), connecting the Throgs Neck Bridge to the Bruckner Expressway. For years, the highway was considered (and signed as) a spur of I-78, which initially followed all of modern I-295 from the Bruckner Interchange to Hillside Avenue (now New York State Route 25). When this section of I-78 was renumbered to I-295 on January 1, 1970, the Throgs Neck Expressway became a spur of that route. In 1986, the New York State Department of Transportation resigned the Throgs Neck Expressway as I-695 to avoid driver confusion with the Cross Bronx Expressway Extension, also signed as I-295. The Federal Highway Administration formally recognized I-695 on April 7, 2008, and the number was approved by the American Association of State Highway and Transportation Officials on May 6, 2008.

== Exit list ==
The entire route is in Throggs Neck of the New York City borough of the Bronx. All exits are unnumbered.

mi	km	Destinations	Notes
0.00	0.00	I-295 south (Cross Bronx Expressway) – Throgs Neck Bridge, Long Island	Southern terminus; exit 10 on I-295; former I-78
0.74	1.19	Randall Avenue	Southbound exit only
1.04	1.67	Lafayette Avenue	Northbound exit and entrance
1.77	2.85	I-95 north (Bruckner Expressway) – New Haven	Northern terminus; exit 7A on I-95 south
1.000 mi = 1.609 km; 1.000 km = 0.621 mi: Incomplete access
