= Cunningham Park =

Public park in Queens, New York

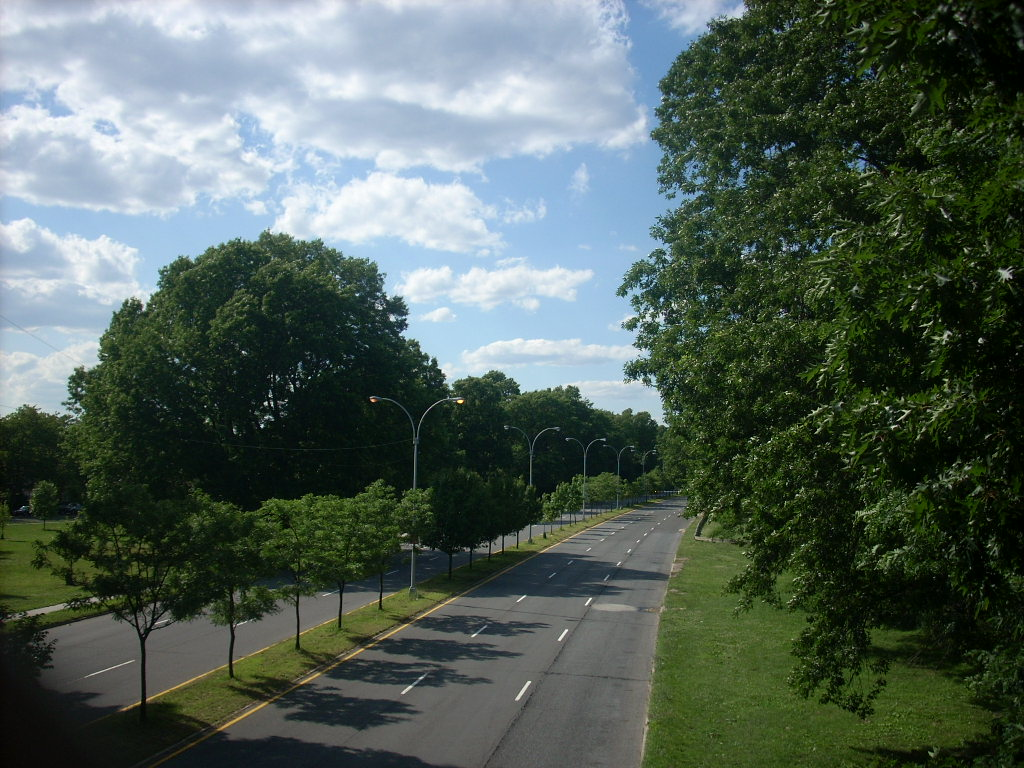
- Francis Lewis Boulevard in Cunningham Park
- Interactive map of Cunningham Park
- Type: public park
- Location: Bordering Oakland Gardens and Fresh Meadows in Queens, New York
- Coordinates: 40°44′N 73°46′W
- Area: 358 acres (145 ha)
- Operator: New York City Department of Parks and Recreation

Cunningham Park is a 358-acre (1.4 km^{2}) park in the New York City borough of Queens. The park lies between the Grand Central Parkway to the south and the Long Island Expressway, and is bifurcated by the Clearview Expressway. The park is operated by the New York City Department of Parks and Recreation.

== History ==
New York City acquired land to build a park, named Hillside Park, in 1928.

Major W. Arthur Cunningham served in World War I as a member of the 165 Infantry of the United States Army. A resident of Forest Hills, Major Cunningham successfully ran as a Republican for the position of controller of New York City in 1933.

After being sworn into office, Cunningham found that the city was deeply in debt and had insufficient funds to repay its debts. Cunningham also found that the city had been far behind in collecting property taxes from landowners. Cunningham said that the city must collect the delinquent property taxes, and that the property tax rate would likely need to be increased in order for the city to stay afloat. Cunningham disclosed all the financial troubles of the city in order to better inform the public.

Cunningham died of a heart attack while riding a horse in Asharoken, Long Island. He was 39 years old. His body was buried in Calvary Cemetery near Long Island City. Queens Borough President George U. Harvey considered Cunningham a dear friend of his, and he thought that Cunningham's untimely death was caused in part by his worries about the city's problems.

In 1935, the Board of Aldermen voted in favor of renaming Hillside Park in honor of Cunningham. In June 1936, a memorial to Cunningham was erected in park in the following month. The memorial was a flagpole set in bronze with an inscribed stone base. Major Cunningham's seven-year-old son, John Arthur Cunningham, unveiled the plaque at a ceremony.

In 1940, New York City bought a piece of land in order to connect discontinuous segments of Francis Lewis Boulevard and to expand Cunningham Park.

A granite and bronze memorial to Major Cunningham was created by sculptor Emil Siebern and installed next to the Cunningham memorial flagpole in 1942.

== Bicycle trails ==
The Long Island Motor Parkway provides a bicycle path through Cunningham Park, west to Kissena Park and east to Alley Pond Park, part of the Brooklyn-Queens Greenway.

Mountain biking trails run throughout northern areas of the park which include two major sections connected by an overpass that runs across the Clearview Expressway. Trails are signed by level and range from beginner to expert.

New York Road Runners hosts a weekly 2.7-mile Open Run.
