= Throgs Neck Bridge =

Bridge in New York City

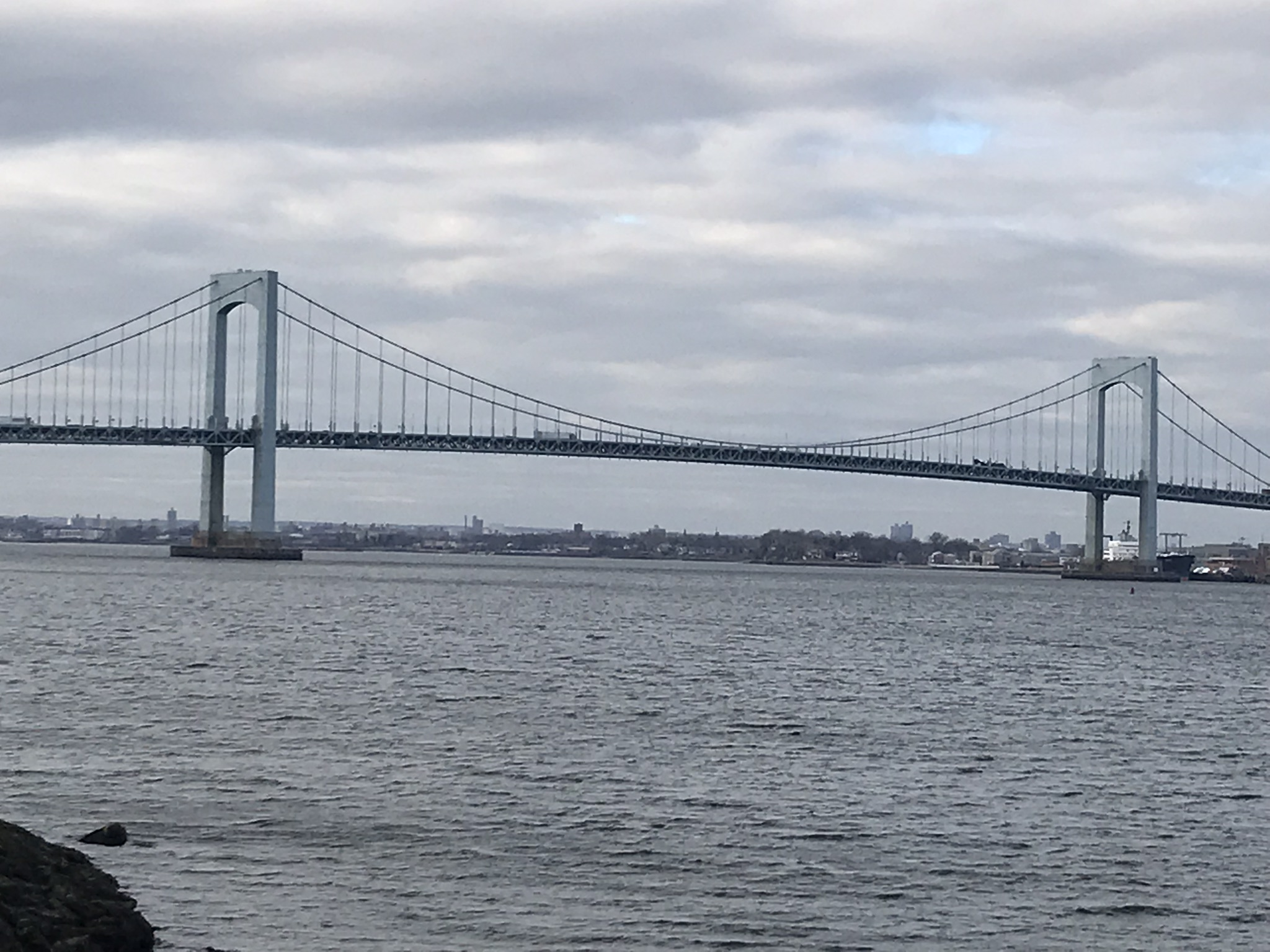
- Throgs Neck Bridge from Fort Totten
- Coordinates: 40.802°N 73.793°W
- Carries: 6 lanes of I-295 Toll
- Crosses: East River
- Locale: New York City (Throggs Neck, Bronx – Bay Terrace, Queens)
- Official name: Throgs Neck Bridge
- Other name: Throggs Neck Bridge
- Maintained by: MTA Bridges and Tunnels

Characteristics
- Design: Suspension bridge
- Total length: 2,910 feet (890 m) (length between anchorages); 11,250 feet (3,430 m) (total length)
- Longest span: 1,800 feet (550 m)
- Clearance below: 142 feet (43 m)

History
- Designer: Othmar Ammann
- Construction cost: $92,000,000
- Opened: January 11, 1961; 65 years ago

Statistics
- Daily traffic: 119,249 (2016)
- Toll: As of August 6, 2023, $11.19 (Tolls By Mail and non-New York E-ZPass); $6.94 (New York E-ZPass); $9.11 (Mid-Tier NYCSC E-Z Pass)

Location
- Interactive map of Throgs Neck Bridge

The Throgs Neck Bridge is a suspension bridge in New York City, carrying six lanes of Interstate 295 (I-295) over the East River where it meets the Long Island Sound. The bridge connects the Throggs Neck section of the Bronx with the Bay Terrace section of Queens.

Opened on January 11, 1961, it is the newest bridge across the East River and was built to relieve traffic on the Bronx–Whitestone Bridge, 2 miles (3.2 km) to the west. The Throgs Neck Bridge is also the easternmost crossing of the East River. Due to this and its proximity to I-95, it is the closest route from Long Island to New Jersey via the George Washington Bridge, as well as points north.

The Throgs Neck Bridge is owned by the government of New York City and operated by the Triborough Bridge and Tunnel Authority (TBTA), an affiliate agency of the Metropolitan Transportation Authority (MTA).

== Description ==
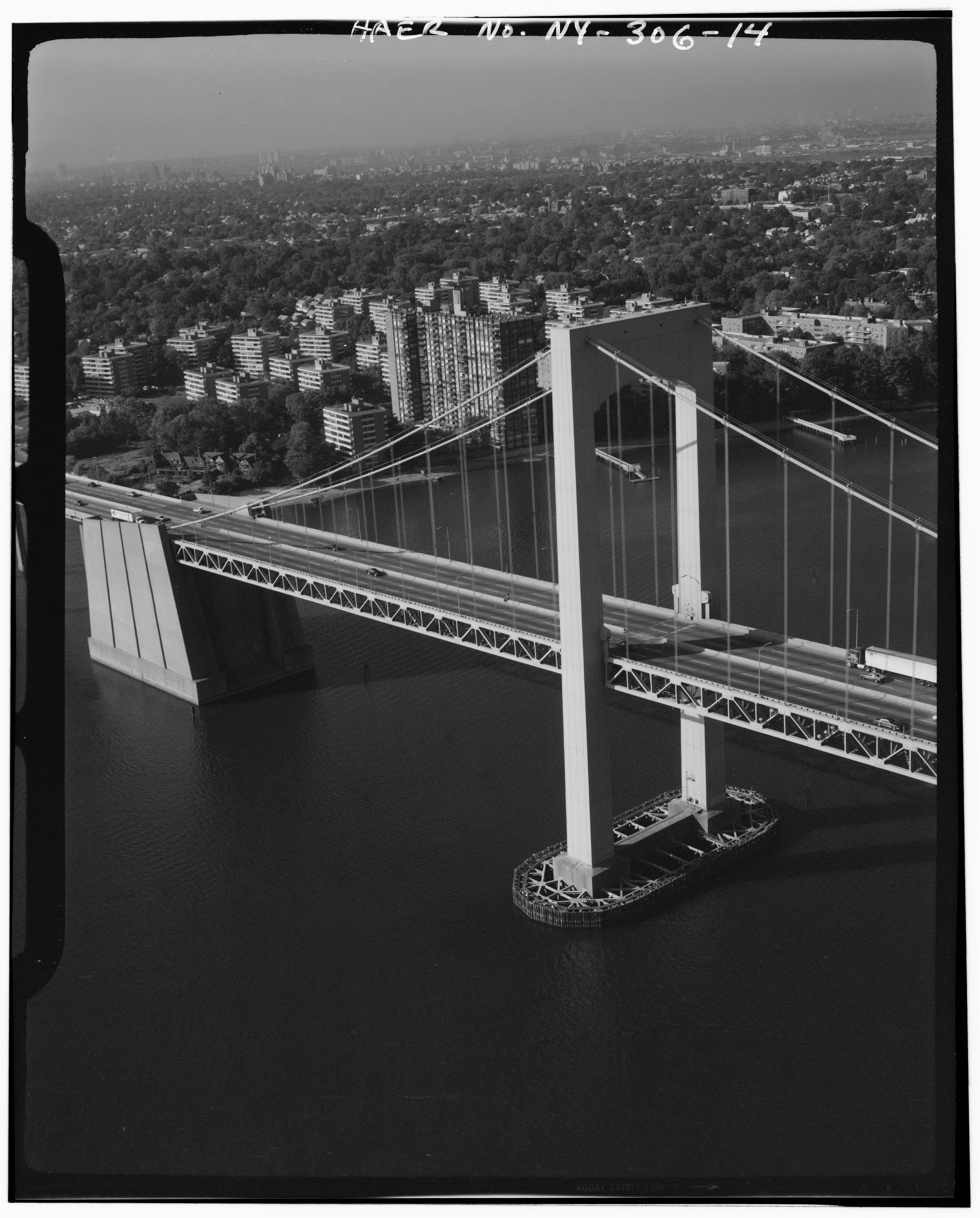
The anchorage (left) and suspension tower (right) on the Queens side of the Throgs Neck Bridge

The Throgs Neck Bridge is a six-lane suspension bridge, with three in each direction. It was designed by structural engineer Othmar Ammann, who also designed the George Washington, Bronx–Whitestone, Verrazzano–Narrows, and Triborough Bridges in New York City. It connects the boroughs of Queens to the south and the Bronx to the north, and is the third vehicular bridge to be constructed between Queens and the Bronx, after the Triborough and Bronx–Whitestone Bridges. Each three-lane roadway is 37 feet (11 m) wide, and the two directions of traffic are divided by a 4-foot-wide (1.2 m) barrier. The roadway is paved with asphalt. There is no pedestrian or bicyclist access of any kind. The Throgs Neck Bridge is a toll bridge; it originally had tollbooths on the Bronx side, but they were replaced by open road tolling gantries in 2017.

=== Design ===
The Throgs Neck Bridge did not have to accommodate large vessels of specific dimensions and as a result, did not need to be as long as other Ammann-designed bridges in New York City. The center span is 1,800 feet (550 m), and the distance between each suspension tower and anchorage is 555 feet (169 m), with an anchorage-to-anchorage total length of 2,910 feet (887 m). The bridge contains two long approach ramps, one on either bank, because both the Bronx and Queens ends are located on low elevations. The bridge has a 3,900-foot (1,200 m) approach ramp in the Bronx, curving over the SUNY Maritime College at Fort Schuyler on the Throggs Neck peninsula, as well as a 2,800-foot (850 m) ramp directly east of Cryder's Point in Bay Terrace, Queens. Including approaches, the bridge spans more than 2.1 miles (3.4 km).

The span is supported by two main cables, which suspend the deck and are held up by the suspension towers. Each main cable contains 37 strands, with each strand made of 296 individual wires, for a total of 10,952 wires per main cable. The main cables weigh 1,790 short tons (1,600 long tons; 1,620 metric tons) each. At each end of the suspension span are two anchorages that hold the main cables, both of which are freestanding concrete structures measuring 250 by 350 feet (76 by 107 m). The bridge's Bronx anchorage is at the tip of Throggs Neck, and the towers are located in the middle of the Long Island Sound. The Queens anchorage is located off the shore of Fort Totten, in the East River.

The suspension towers of the bridge are of closed-box construction with arched struts at the top of each tower. The tops of the suspension towers are sharp and blocky atop the struts, and there are flattened segmental arches on the underside of the struts. Both suspension towers are located on artificial concrete islands in the East River, which are 20 feet (6.1 m) above mean high water. Each suspension tower rises 326 feet (99 m) above the islands, or 346 feet (105 m) above mean high water. Peregrine falcons have lived high on a suspension tower since at least 1983, when they were first spotted. They are thought to have nested there because the tops of the towers resembled their natural habitat of high cliffs.

Instead of employing a rather streamlined-looking plate-girder system, Ammann constructed the bridge with 28-foot-deep (8.5 m) stiffening transverse trusses under the deck. These served as counterweights to the bridge and allowed any wind to simply blow through, instead of against, the bridge. The asphalt roadway lies atop a 5-inch-thick (13 cm) deck, which consists of dozens of panels that lie directly above the trusses.

=== Road connections ===
The Throgs Neck Bridge was one of the few that were not part of the plans for the Belt Parkway around Queens and Brooklyn. Instead, the bridge was built along with the Clearview Expressway in Queens and the eastern part of the Cross Bronx Expressway in the Bronx.

The Throgs Neck Bridge carries Interstate 295 (I-295). On the Queens side, the bridge connects to the southbound Clearview Expressway (I-295) and the southbound Cross Island Parkway. There is no direct connection to the northbound Cross Island Parkway or from the Cross Island Parkway service roads in either direction. On the Bronx side, there are connections to and from the community of Throggs Neck. The northbound entrance and exit leads to the Throgs Neck Expressway service road, while the southbound exit and entrance leads from the intersection of the Throgs Neck Expressway service road and Harding Avenue. Immediately afterward, the highway splits into the Throgs Neck Expressway (I-695), which connects to northbound I-95; and I-295, which connects to southbound I-95, westbound I-278, and northbound Hutchinson River Parkway at the Bruckner Interchange.

=== Traffic restrictions ===
As of 2015, the Throgs Neck Bridge has a height limit of 14 feet 7 inches (4.45 m) for southbound vehicles and 15 feet 1 inch (4.60 m) for northbound vehicles. The maximum width of any vehicle is 15 feet 0 inches (4.57 m). Tractor-trailers exceeding 53 feet and traveling between Long Island and the Bronx are required to use the Throgs Neck Bridge. A weight limit is imposed on heavy vehicles traveling on the bridge. The MTA allows 6 and 7-axle trucks with less than 105,000 lb (48,000 kg) of gross vehicle weight, and 5-axle trucks with less than 102,000 lb (46,000 kg) of gross vehicle weight, if they have valid divisible-load permits. Trucks carrying less than 80,000 lb (36,000 kg) may also use the bridge, but all heavy loads are speed-restricted to 30 miles per hour (48 km/h) and must use the center lane of the bridge. Heavy trucks carrying more than 80,000 lb without permits are prohibited from using the Throgs Neck Bridge.

== Name ==
The name of "Throgs Neck" in the bridge's name derives from John Throckmorton, who first settled Throggs Neck. The traditionally correct spelling is with two "g"s. Robert Moses—chairman of the Triborough Bridge and Tunnel Authority (TBTA), which built the bridge—likely chose the variant with one "g" because it was easier to spell.

== History ==
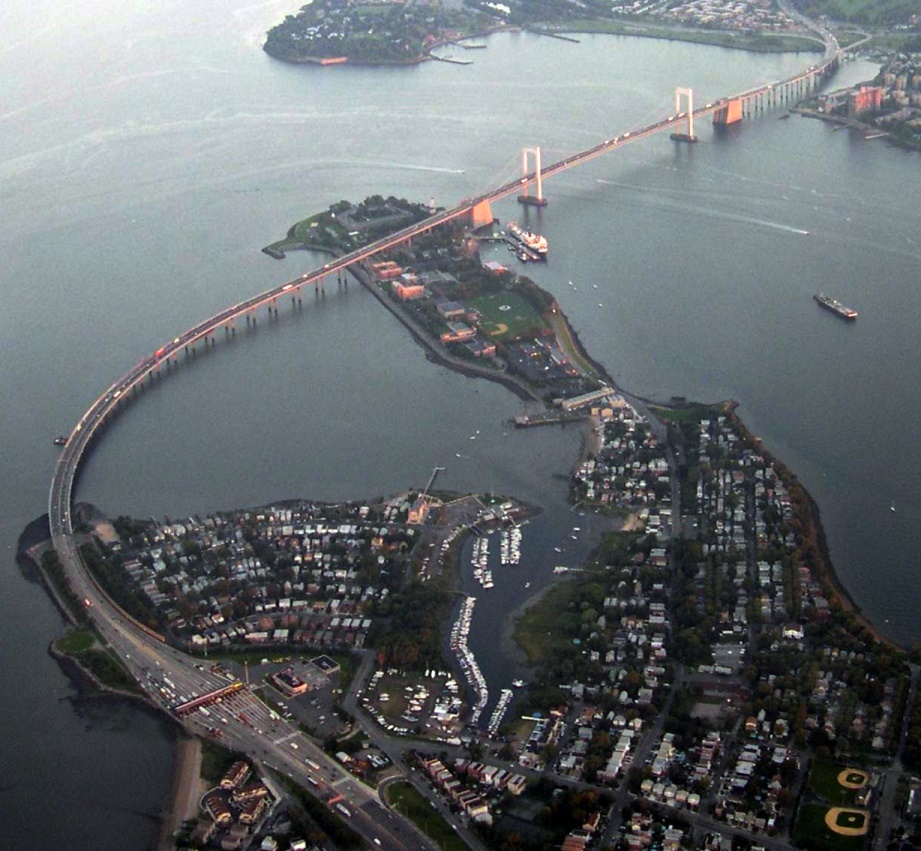
Aerial view, seen from the Bronx side

=== Planning ===
Plans for a bridge between Throggs Neck and Queens date to a 1932 study by engineer J. Franklin Perrine. However, he discarded the proposed Throggs Neck-to-Queens span because it would have required the construction of new highways at either end.

The Throgs Neck Bridge's construction was announced in January 1955, by the Port Authority and the TBTA as part of the Port Authority's Joint Study of Arterial Facilities, a $600 million plan to improve highway access in the New York City area (equal to $6.46 billion in 2025). The plan also included the construction of the Verrazzano–Narrows Bridge, the addition of a second deck to the George Washington Bridge, and the completion of connecting highways in and around the city. The Throgs Neck Bridge was to cost $93 million. The span was needed because of increasing congestion on the Bronx–Whitestone Bridge 2 miles (3.2 km) west, which was nearing its traffic capacity by the late 1950s. Traffic loads on the Triborough and Bronx–Whitestone Bridges had more than doubled on both bridges after World War II. The city and Port Authority came to a provisional agreement for the highway arterial plan in late March 1955, and the plan was officially approved by the New York state legislature two weeks later.

Initially, the bridge approach on the Queens side was controversial because of the number of people who would be displaced, and there were proposals to scrap the bridge entirely. In September 1956, Queens borough leaders agreed on the location for the Queens approach of the Throgs Neck Bridge. From the Queens anchorage, the approach would descend to a point east of the Clearview Golf Course, approximately between 206th and 207th Streets, and continue south as the Clearview Expressway. This routing would displace 421 homes, compared to 860 in the original plan.

Shortly after the arterial plan was approved, drivers on the Triborough and Bronx–Whitestone Bridges were surveyed in order to assess demand for the Throgs Neck Bridge. However, by February 1956, the funding for the Throgs Neck Bridge had not yet been acquired. In January 1957, the Port Authority provided $13 million in funding for the New York City arterial plan, and the New York state government gave another $469 million.

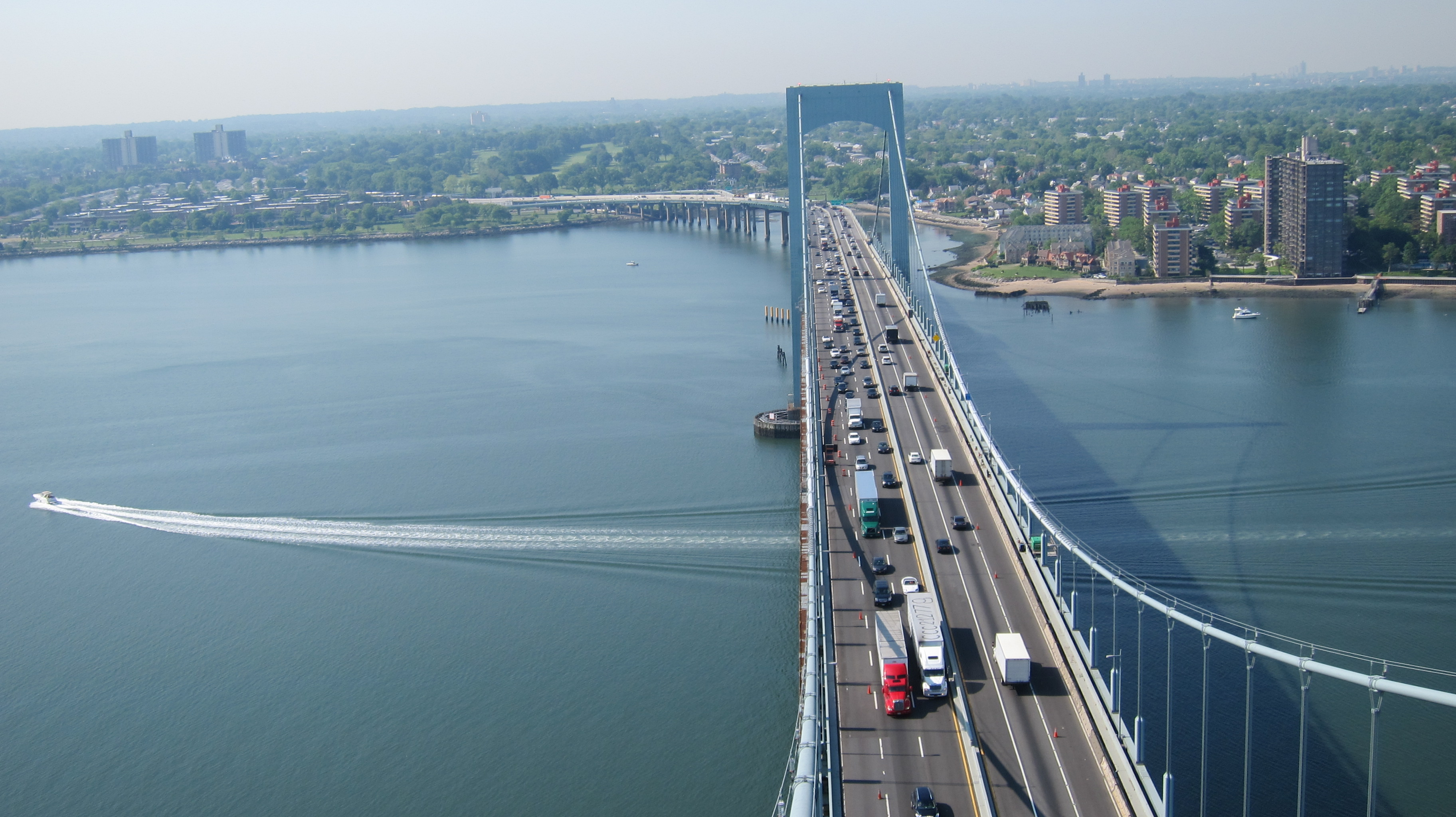
View from the north tower

With funding secured, the Throgs Neck Bridge was ready for the start of construction. Then, at the end of March 1957, the New York state legislature suddenly changed the approach route for the Throgs Neck and Narrows Bridges without the city's knowledge. The city then decided to defer any decision on either bridge for a year because both bridges' approaches would require potentially controversial home relocations. One plan had the Throgs Neck Bridge approach in Queens connect directly to a road paralleling the Cross Island Parkway, rather than to the proposed Clearview Expressway. TBTA officials warned that the Throgs Neck Bridge could not be approved for construction until an approach route was finalized. The revised approach routes for both the Narrows and the Throgs Neck bridges were approved that June, which allowed construction on both crossings to begin. As a result of the revisions to the Clearview Expressway approach, the cost estimate for the Throgs Neck Bridge increased to $126 million.

The city approved the construction of the bridge that July. A final obstacle was removed in August, when the United States Senate passed a bill stating that the construction of the proposed bridge over the SUNY Maritime College at Fort Schuyler was not a breach of a prior land conveyance, and authorized the United States Army to give the New York state government some land for the bridge's construction. The SUNY Maritime College would receive 7 acres (2.8 ha) of land in exchange for an easement to allow the bridge to be constructed over the college.

=== Construction ===
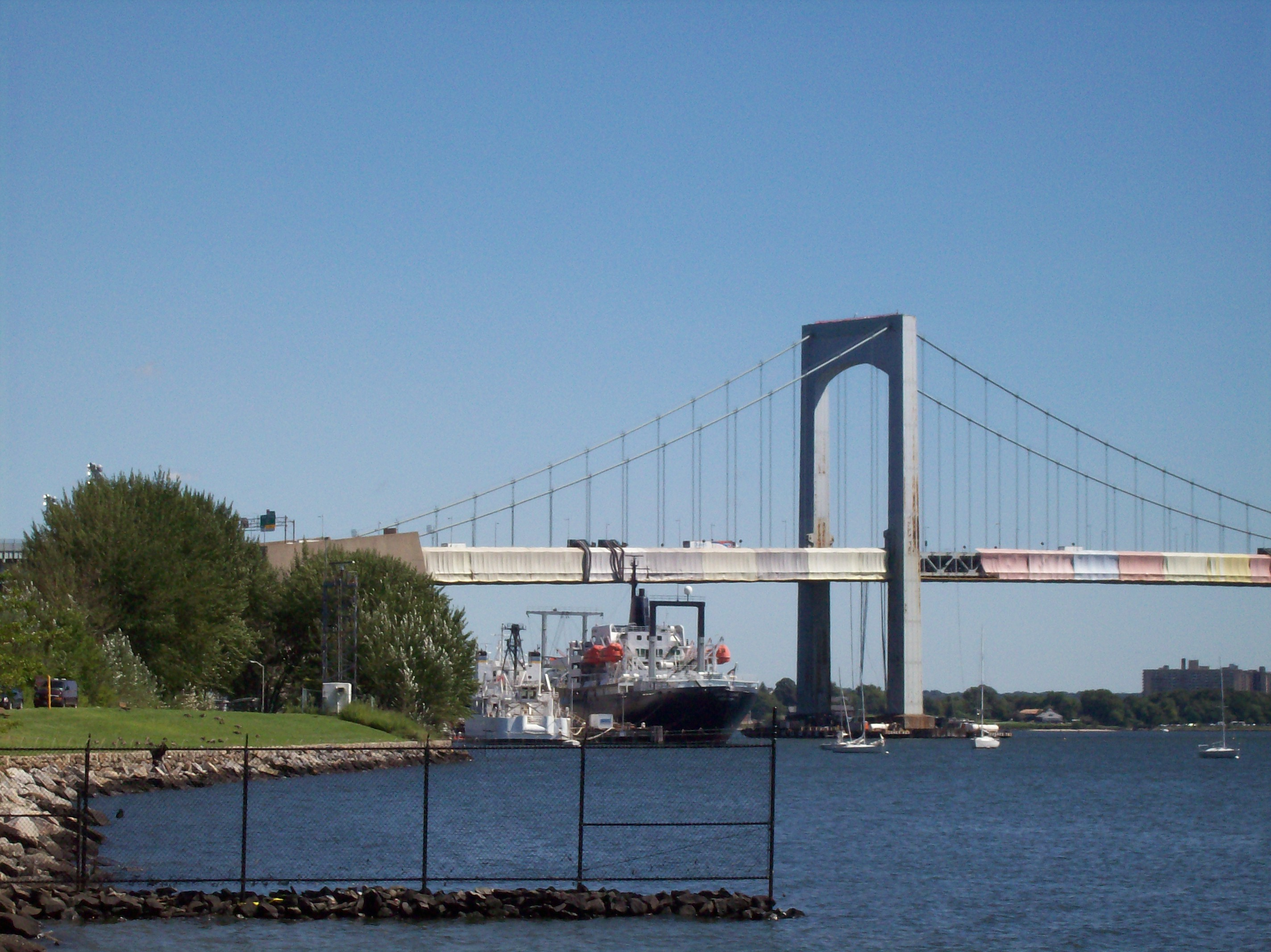
The Empire State VI moored to the north of the bridge

TBTA chairman Moses commissioned Othmar Ammann for the construction of the Throgs Neck Bridge. This was Ammann's first long-span bridge project since 1931, which saw the dedication of the George Washington Bridge over the Hudson River. A groundbreaking ceremony for the Throgs Neck Bridge occurred at the SUNY Maritime College on October 22, 1957. At the time, the approach roads alone were expected to cost $51 million, nearly half of the total bridge cost. It was expected that the bridge would be complete by 1961. A month later, six construction contracts worth $42.5 million were awarded, representing nearly half of the span's cost. The contract for the suspension towers' metal was awarded to Bethlehem Steel at a cost of $10.2 million, and the contract for the towers' concrete went to Merrit, Chapman and Scott for $7.5 million. The suspension cables would then be built by U.S. Steel for $6.3 million.

Work on the Queens anchorage began in March 1958. The 162-by-72-foot (49 by 22 m) steel caissons for the Throgs Neck Bridge were shipped up the East River that summer. The 73-short-ton (65-long-ton; 66-metric-ton) steel assembly for the first of the two suspension towers were installed in April 1959. Afterward, the suspension towers were installed in pieces. Each piece measured 23.5 feet (7.2 m) tall by 11 by 9 feet (3.4 by 2.7 m) around. Work on the towers proceeded quickly; by September 1959, the Bronx suspension tower was fully completed, and the Queens tower was 60% completed. However, a steelworkers' strike in October 1959 threatened to delay further completion.

By January 1960, both towers of the Throgs Neck Bridge had been completed, and the first 1,800 feet (550 m) wire between the two suspension towers had been installed. This cable marked the location of the future bridge deck, but in the interim, it would be one of six wires that would support temporary catwalks between the suspension towers. The spinning of the main cables between the tops of each suspension tower began in March. The wires for the cables were spun from reels near the base of the bridge, and then pulled across to the opposite side by two wheels, one at each bridge tower. The cables were fully spun by June 1960, and the vertical suspender cables connecting the main cables with the deck were installed.

The steel girder sections that comprised the bridge deck were prefabricated at another location and then shipped to the site of the Throgs Neck Bridge. Each section measured 82 by 93 feet (25 by 28 m) and weighed 200 short tons (180 long tons; 180 metric tons). The sections were installed on the bridge at a rate of two per day. Installation of the deck started at each suspension tower and continued outward in either direction, extending toward the center and the approach viaducts on each side. Afterward, concrete was poured atop the steel sections. The steelwork for the roadway was completed in summer 1960, and work on constructing the Throgs Neck Bridge's approaches progressed simultaneously. The Queens approach viaduct had been completed up to the suspension span in September 1960. The final work on the bridge consisted of sheathing the main cables, as well as paving the roadway with asphalt. By December 1960, tollbooths for the bridge were being installed, and a definite opening date had been set for the next month.

=== Opening and early years ===
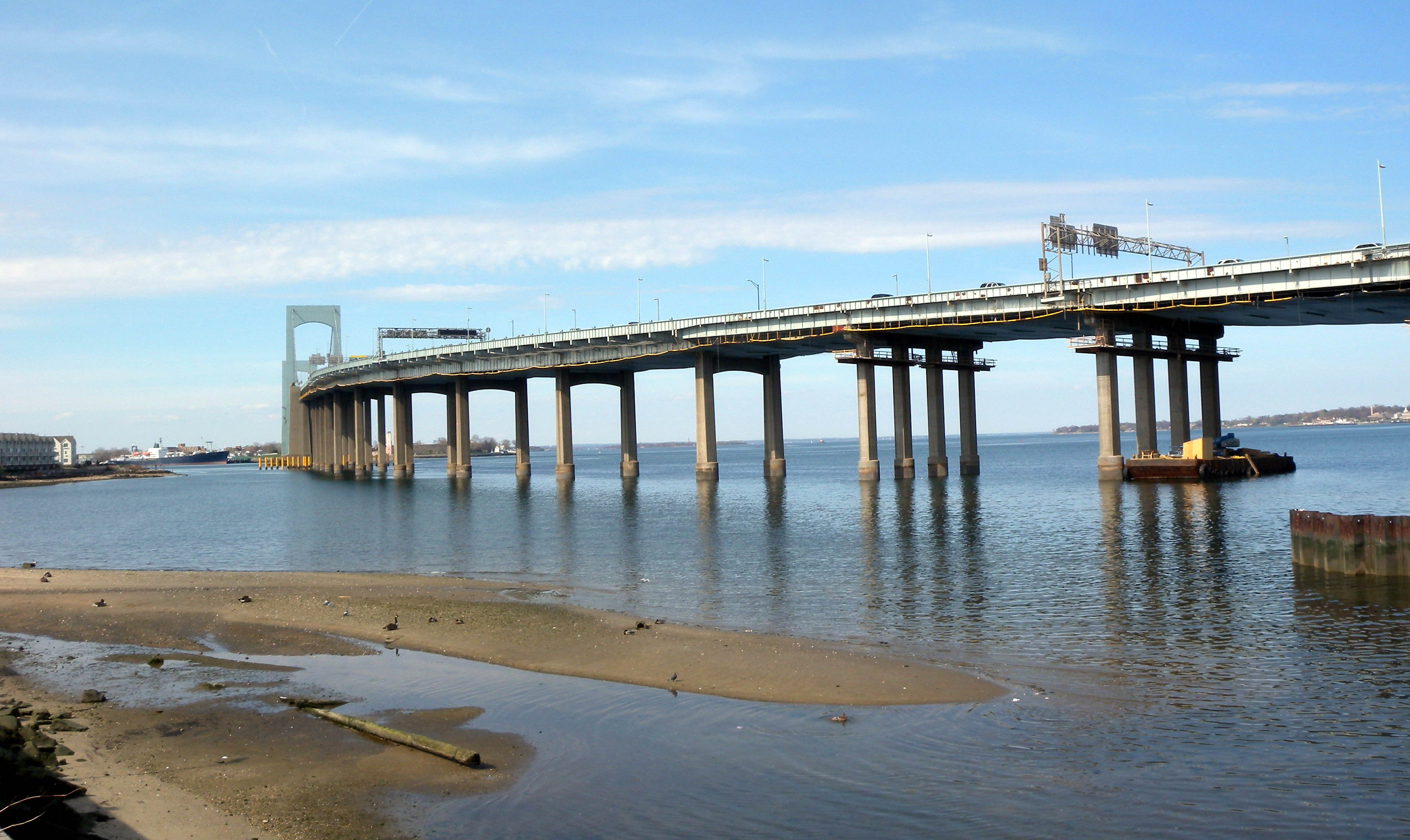
View of Queens approach from ground level

The Throgs Neck Bridge opened with a short ceremony on January 11, 1961; its total construction cost had been $92 million. The bridge opened along with a segment of the Clearview Expressway southward to 73rd Avenue in Fresh Meadows, as well as the Cross Bronx and Throgs Neck Expressways in the Bronx. The bridge's opening was attended by Robert Moses, as well as mayor Robert F. Wagner Jr., lieutenant governor Malcolm Wilson, City Council president Abe Stark, and Queens borough president John T. Clancy. The opening of the Throgs Neck Bridge had been accelerated in advance of the start of the 1964 New York World's Fair at nearby Flushing Meadows–Corona Park. Immediately after the bridge's opening ceremony, the delegation attended the opening of a World's Fair attraction at Flushing Meadows–Corona Park. The bridge's opening drew protests from homeowners in Queens who had been forced to relocate due to the construction of the Clearview Expressway. Several dozen women walked across the bridge, holding signs and attempting to block the first vehicles driving on the bridge.

It was expected that the Throgs Neck Bridge's opening would initially cause 15 million vehicles annually to be diverted to the span from other bridges, and by 1981, the bridge would carry 37.5 million vehicles annually. Within the first twelve hours of the bridge's opening, 20,000 vehicles had used the bridge. The Throgs Neck Bridge had carried 16.4 million vehicles by the end of the year, and the Bronx–Whitestone Bridge recorded a corresponding 40% decline in traffic in 1961.

The Throgs Neck Bridge was originally designated as part of I-78, which extended south to Hillside Avenue (NY 25), the southern terminus of the Clearview Expressway. I-78 was to continue south and west across Queens, Brooklyn, and Manhattan to the Holland Tunnel. Ultimately, nearly all sections of I-78 between the Holland Tunnel and Hillside Avenue were canceled by Governor Nelson Rockefeller in 1971. This resulted in the renumbering of all of I-78 north of Hillside Avenue, including the Throgs Neck Bridge, to I-295 on January 1, 1970.

=== Later years ===
The Throgs Neck Bridge's deck was renovated in 1983. That July, the MTA initially signed a contract to use steel imported from Japan and South Korea, around the same time that Governor Mario Cuomo signed a "Buy American" law (not to be confused with the federal "Buy America" provision) giving preference to American steel. The contract was controversial because, although importing Asian steel would have been $3.5 million cheaper than buying American steel, it would have also disadvantaged American workers. Subsequently, Cuomo tried to get the MTA to reverse its decision. In September 1983, Cuomo signed an executive order mandating the use of American steel, and the MTA narrowly voted to reverse its prior decision.

The construction of the Throgs Neck Bridge's Queens approaches bisected Clearview Park (renamed Little Bay Park in 1973), which had been established by the New York City Department of Parks and Recreation in 1950. The park's athletic fields received a $666,000 refurbishment in 1998, and a bicycle path and roller hockey rink were installed in 1999 at a cost of $1.2 million.

After a June 2005 inspection of the Throgs Neck Bridge, damage was found on the approach viaducts. The damage was found to be more severe away from the median barrier. As a result, heavy trucks carrying over 40 tons were permitted to use the bridge only between 11:00 p.m. and 5:00 a.m., when traffic was lightest. The program was canceled in 2007, and overweight vehicles were only allowed to use the bridge with a special permit. As of 2018, heavy trucks carrying less than 40 short tons (36 long tons; 36 metric tons), as well as selected heavy trucks carrying more than 40 tons with permits, may use the Throgs Neck Bridge; all other trucks are restricted. In 2019, the MTA announced that it would replace the concrete deck with a steel deck as part of a $336 million project. Work on replacing the deck began in September 2020. Five of the bridge's six lanes remained open for the duration of the project. The MTA installed a movable barrier, providing three lanes in the peak direction during weekday rush hours (toward the Bronx in the morning and toward Queens in the afternoon).

== Tolls ==
As of January 4, 2026, drivers pay $12.03 per car or $5.06 per motorcycle for tolls by mail/non-NYCSC E-Z Pass. E-ZPass users with transponders issued by the New York E‑ZPass Customer Service Center pay $7.46 per car or $3.25 per motorcycle. Mid-Tier NYCSC E-Z Pass users pay $9.79 per car or $4.18 per motorcycle. All E-ZPass users with transponders not issued by the New York E-ZPass CSC will be required to pay Toll-by-mail rates.

Originally, the toll plaza of the Throgs Neck Bridge, located on the Bronx side, contained 14 toll lanes. By 1996, the year that E-ZPass was introduced, it had been expanded to 20 lanes. The initial rollout of E-ZPass at the Throgs Neck Bridge caused large delays, as some of the toll lanes were dedicated exclusively to E-ZPass users, unlike at other MTA crossings that did not have dedicated E-ZPass lanes. In February 1998, the MTA discontinued the sale of toll tokens on the Throgs Neck Bridge. Throggs Neck residents stated that they could not easily access the E-ZPass lanes from the Harding Avenue entrance to the bridge, as the E-ZPass lanes were located toward the center of the tollbooth, while the bridge entrance was on the far-right side.

Open-road cashless tolling began on September 30, 2017. The tollbooths, which were at the Bronx end of the bridge, have been gradually dismantled, and drivers are no longer able to pay cash at the bridge. Instead, cameras and E-ZPass readers are mounted on new overhead gantries manufactured by TransCore near where the booths were located. A vehicle without E-ZPass has a picture taken of its license plate and a bill for the toll is mailed to its owner. For E-ZPass users, sensors detect their transponders wirelessly.

=== Historical tolls ===
Historical passenger tolls for the Throgs Neck Bridge (Note: This table lists the peak tolls for two-axle vehicles. Motorcycle tolls and off-peak tolls are lower, and tolls for vehicles with additional axles are higher.)
Years	Toll		Toll equivalent in 2025		Ref.
Years	Cash	E-ZPass	Cash	E-ZPass	Ref.
1961–1972	$0.25	—N/a	$1.92–2.69	—N/a	
1972–1975	$0.50	—N/a	$2.99–3.85	—N/a	
1975–1980	$0.75	—N/a	$2.93–4.49	—N/a	
1980–1982	$1.00	—N/a	$3.34–3.91	—N/a	
1982–1984	$1.25	—N/a	$3.87–4.17	—N/a	
1984–1986	$1.50	—N/a	$4.49–4.41	—N/a	
1986–1987	$1.75	—N/a	$4.96–5.14	—N/a	
1987–1989	$2.00	—N/a	$5.19–5.67	—N/a	
1989–1993	$2.50	—N/a	$5.57–6.49	—N/a	
1993–1996	$3.00	—N/a	$6.16–6.69	—N/a	
1996–2003	$3.50	$3.50	$6.13–7.18	$6.13–7.18	
2003–2005	$4.00	$4.00	$6.59–7.00	$6.59–7.00	
2005–2008	$4.50	$4.00	$6.73–7.42	$5.98–6.59	
2008–2010	$5.00	$4.15	$7.38–7.48	$6.13–6.21	
2010–2015	$6.50	$4.80	$8.83–9.60	$6.52–7.09	
2015–2017	$8.00	$5.54	$10.51–10.87	$7.28–7.52	
2017–2019	$8.50	$5.76	$10.70–11.16	$7.25–7.57	
2019–2021	$9.50	$6.12	$11.29–11.96	$7.27–7.71	
2021–2023	$10.17	$6.55	$10.75–12.08	$6.92–7.78	
2023–2026	$11.19	$6.94	$11.19–11.82	$6.94–7.33	
2026–present	$12.03	$7.46	$12.03	$7.46	

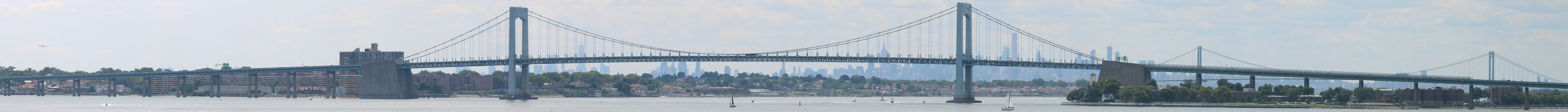

== Incidents ==
A truck with faulty brakes ran into the bridge's toll booths on May 31, 1995. The next day, the same truck ran into the tollbooths again. Only the driver was injured.

On July 10, 2009, during early-morning maintenance work to replace the deck, a construction worker's blow torch sparked a three-alarm fire on the bridge. The fire closed the bridge for much of the day, sending traffic in both directions to the nearby Whitestone Bridge. Most of the lanes were quickly reopened, but the third lane remained closed for repairs for a month.

== See also ==
- List of bridges documented by the Historic American Engineering Record in New York
