= Bruckner Interchange =

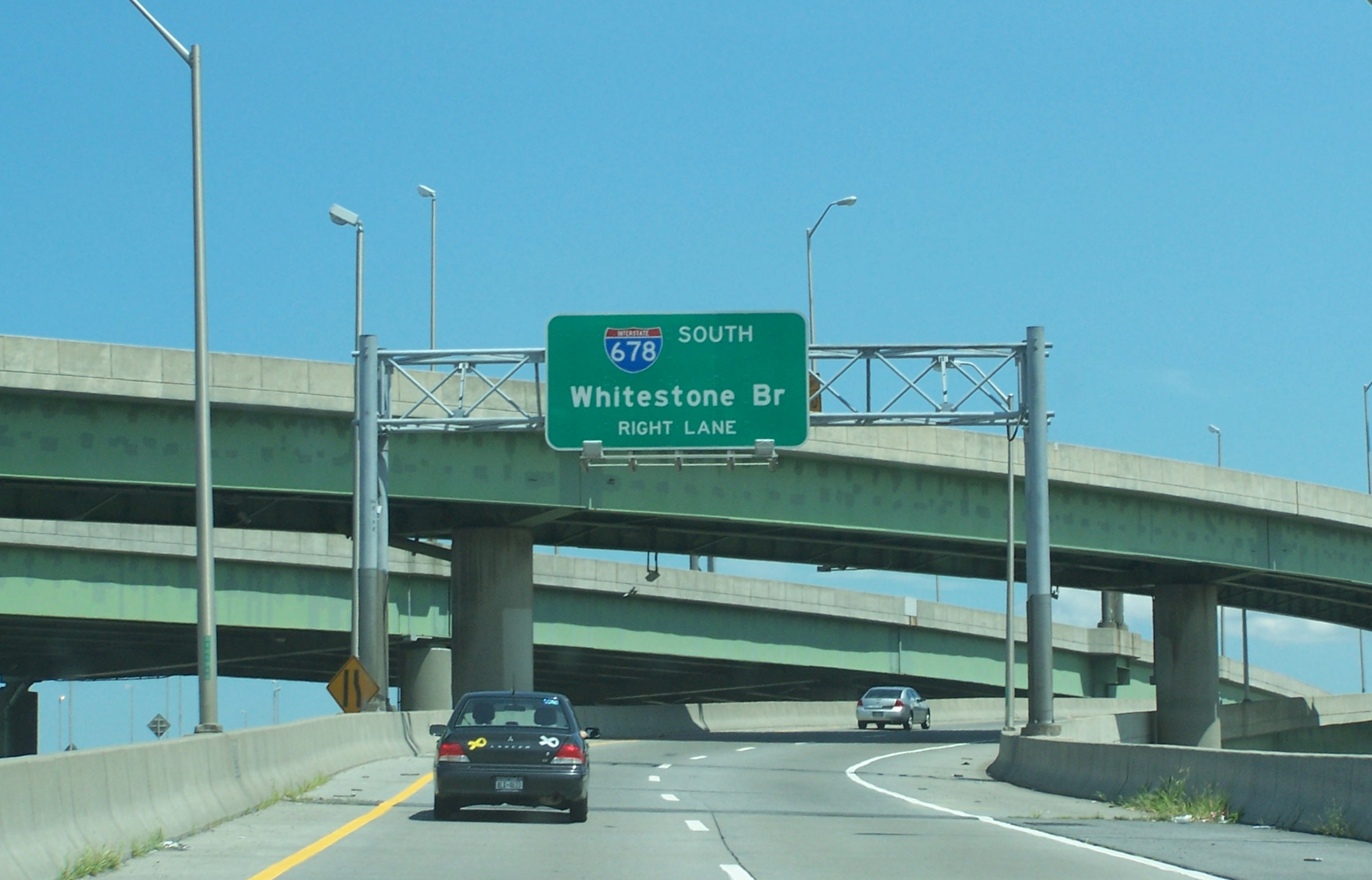
- Signage for I-678 on the ramp from I-278 eastbound. Two of the interchange's many ramps are visible in the background.
- Interactive map of Bruckner Interchange

Location
- The Bronx, New York
- Coordinates: 40.828424°N 73.840442°W
- Roads at junction: I-95; I-278; I-295; I-678; Hutchinson River Parkway; Bruckner Boulevard

Construction
- Constructed: 1969-1972
- Opened: 1972

The Bruckner Interchange is a complex interchange in the New York City borough of The Bronx in the United States. The junction connects four highways: the Bruckner, Cross Bronx, and Hutchinson River Expressways, and the Hutchinson River Parkway. It was constructed in the 1960s; however, elements of the junction date as far back as the 1940s. The interchange includes connections to several interstate routes, including I-278, I-678, I-295 and I-95.

== Description ==
The Bruckner Interchange is located in the southeastern portion of The Bronx in the neighborhoods of Unionport (near Castle Hill) and Schuylerville. It is linear-shaped, comprising a series of closely spaced ramps that extend for roughly 0.5 miles (0.80 km) on an east–west axis. The junction crosses Westchester Creek about 2 miles (3.2 km) from its south end at the East River. The interchange serves as the meeting point of four highways: the Cross Bronx Expressway to the northwest and its extension to the southeast; the Bruckner Expressway to the southwest and northeast; the Hutchinson River Expressway to the south; and the Hutchinson River Parkway to the north. Below the freeway connections, Bruckner Boulevard connects to a handful of local surface streets, but also handles most connections to the Hutchinson River Parkway.

Fundamentally, the interchange is the crossing of three major thoroughfares, each of which change route numbers as they cross the interchange. The Cross Bronx Expressway traverses the interchange from northwest (I-95) to southeast (I-295), the Bruckner Expressway traverses from southwest (I-278) to northeast (I-95) while the Hutchinson River Parkway traverses from north (unnumbered) to south (I-678). (Because of road naming conventions in New York, the Hutchinson River Parkway changes its name to the Hutchinson River Expressway, to allow truck access to the Whitestone Bridge. This short section is also sometimes considered part of the Whitestone Expressway, also an alternate name for part of I-678)

Interstate 95 (I-95) passes through the interchange, entering from the northwest on the Cross Bronx Expressway and exiting to the northeast on the Bruckner Expressway. I-278, I-295, I-678, and the Hutchinson River Parkway all begin or end at this interchange. The Cross Bronx Expressway continues southeast from the Bruckner Interchange as I-295, while the Bruckner Expressway enters the junction from the southwest as I-278. The Hutchinson River Expressway is I-678, which becomes the Hutchinson River Parkway north of the interchange. The Bruckner Interchange is the southernmost of the three times the Hutchinson River Parkway crosses I-95 in the Bronx.

=== Missing connections ===
Several connections are missing at the junction, largely due to its compact design. However, such omissions are either remedied elsewhere or considered unnecessary under the circumstances.

| Missing connection | Connected by |
|---|---|
| I-95 north to I-278 west | Sheridan Boulevard (NY 895) 2 miles (3.2 km) west of the interchange |
| I-295 north to I-95 north | The Throgs Neck Expressway (I-695) 1 mile (1.6 km) east of the interchange |
| I-295 to I-678 | Lafayette Avenue .25 miles (0.40 km) south of the interchange The Long Island Expressway (I-495) 8 miles (13 km) south of the interchange (in Queens) |
| I-678 to I-295 | Lafayette Avenue .25 miles (0.40 km) south of the interchange The Long Island Expressway (I-495) 8 miles (13 km) south of the interchange (in Queens) |

== History ==
The location of the interchange was originally the point where the Whitestone Parkway connected to Bruckner Boulevard (then-New York State Route 1A). In the early 1940s, the Hutchinson River Parkway was extended southward from Pelham Bay Park to Bruckner Boulevard, where it fed into the Whitestone Parkway. Bruckner Boulevard also served as the initial eastern endpoint of the Cross Bronx Expressway, the first section of which was built in the early 1950s and ran from the Bronx River Parkway to a point just west of the Hutchinson River Parkway. The section of Bruckner Boulevard between the Cross Bronx Expressway and the Hutchinson River Parkway was upgraded into a freeway shortly afterward.

Most of Bruckner Boulevard was ultimately converted into the Bruckner Expressway, with the boulevard name reassigned to one-way streets running along both sides of the freeway. By 1961, the freeway was complete from the Bronx River northeast to the Pelham Parkway, including in the vicinity of the Hutchinson River Parkway. The Cross Bronx Expressway Extension was also finished by this time. Both developments led to the construction of the modern Bruckner Interchange, which was designed to accommodate the reconstruction of Bruckner Boulevard and the opening of the Cross Bronx Extension while retaining the pre-existing connections with the Cross Bronx Expressway and the Hutchinson River Parkway. The Bruckner interchange fully opened in December 1972 for a total cost of $68.15 million.
