= Bronx–Whitestone Bridge =

Bridge in New York City

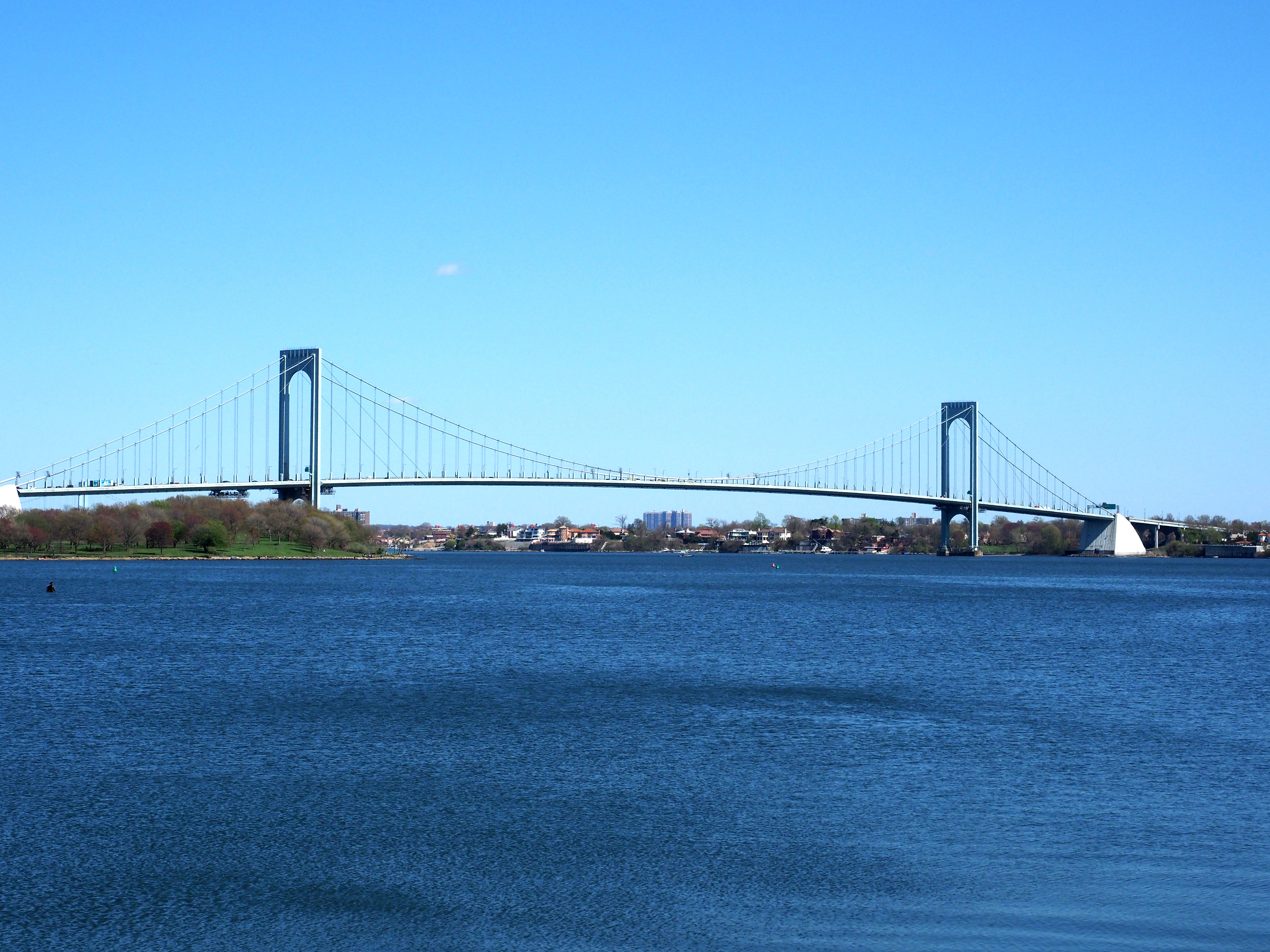
- View of the Bronx–Whitestone Bridge from Clason Point Park on the Bronx side
- Coordinates: 40°48′04″N 73°49′45″W
- Carries: 6 lanes of I-678 Toll
- Crosses: East River
- Locale: New York City (Throggs Neck, Bronx – Whitestone, Queens)
- Other name: Whitestone Bridge
- Maintained by: MTA Bridges and Tunnels

Characteristics
- Design: Suspension bridge
- Total length: 3,770 feet (1,150 m)
- Longest span: 2,300 feet (700 m)
- Clearance above: 14 feet 6 inches (4.4 m)
- Clearance below: 134 feet 10 inches (41.1 m)

History
- Construction cost: $17.5 million
- Opened: April 29, 1939; 87 years ago

Statistics
- Daily traffic: 124,337 (2016)
- Toll: As of August 6, 2023, $11.19 (Tolls By Mail and non-New York E-ZPass); $6.94 (New York E-ZPass); $9.11 (Mid-Tier NYCSC E-Z Pass)

Location
- Interactive map of Bronx–Whitestone Bridge

The Bronx–Whitestone Bridge (colloquially referred to as the Whitestone Bridge or simply the Whitestone) is a suspension bridge in New York City, carrying six lanes of Interstate 678 over the East River. The bridge connects Throggs Neck and Ferry Point Park in the Bronx, on the East River's northern shore, with the Whitestone neighborhood of Queens on the southern shore.

Although the Bronx–Whitestone Bridge's construction was proposed as early as 1905, it was not approved until 1936. The bridge was designed by Swiss-American architect Othmar Ammann and design engineer Allston Dana and opened to traffic with four lanes on April 29, 1939. The bridge's design was similar to that of the Tacoma Narrows Bridge, which collapsed in 1940. As a result, extra stiffening trusses were added to the Bronx–Whitestone Bridge in the early 1940s, and it was widened to six lanes during the same project. The Bronx–Whitestone Bridge was also renovated in 1988–1991 to repair the anchorages, roadways, and drainage. The stiffening trusses were removed during a renovation in the mid-2000s, and the bridge's deck and approach viaducts were replaced soon afterward.

The Bronx–Whitestone Bridge is owned by New York City and operated by MTA Bridges and Tunnels, an affiliate agency of the Metropolitan Transportation Authority. With a center span of 2,300 feet (700 m), the Bronx–Whitestone Bridge once had the fourth-largest center span of any suspension bridge in the world. The bridge has a total length of 3,700 feet (1,100 m), and its towers reach 377 feet (115 m) above water level.

== Description ==
The Bronx–Whitestone Bridge has a 2,300-foot (700 m) main span between its two suspension towers, with the span rising 150 feet (46 m) above mean high water. The side spans, between suspension towers and anchorages at each end, are 735 feet (224 m). Thus, the overall length, from anchorage to anchorage, is 3,770 feet (1,150 m). As originally designed, the bridge approach on the Queens side descended to ground level via a 1,016-foot (310 m)-long plate girder viaduct, then another 194 feet (59 m) on a concrete ramp. The Bronx side's approach descended 1,861 feet (567 m) on a plate girder viaduct, then another 266 feet (81 m) on a concrete ramp. A toll booth was located on the Bronx side immediately after the end of the concrete ramp.

The span is supported by two main cables, which suspend the deck and are held up by the suspension towers. Each cable is 3,965 feet (1,209 m) long and contains 9,862 wires, amounting to around 14,800 miles (23,800 km) of cable length. Each cable contains 37 strands of 266 wires, which in turn measure 0.196 inches (5.0 mm) thick. Each of the suspension towers has a height of 377 feet (115 m) above mean high water. The caissons, in turn, are submerged about 165 feet (50 m) beneath mean high water. At each end of the suspension span are two anchorages that hold the main cables, both of which are freestanding concrete structures measuring 180 by 110 feet (55 by 34 m). The width of the bridge deck between the cables is 74 feet (23 m).

Unlike other suspension bridges, the Bronx–Whitestone Bridge originally did not have a stiffening truss system. Instead, 11-foot (3.4 m) I-beam girders gave the bridge an Art Deco streamlined appearance. After the 1940 collapse of the Tacoma Narrows Bridge, a bridge of similar design, trusses were added on the Bronx–Whitestone Bridge to minimize the span's oscillations. Further modifications to the bridge were made in 1988–1991 and in 2003–2005.

=== Highway connections ===
The Bronx–Whitestone Bridge carries Interstate 678 (I-678). In Queens, the Whitestone Expressway (I-678) extends south to an interchange with the Cross Island Parkway, located just past the end of the bridge's approach ramps. There is an exit from the bridge to the southbound Whitestone Expressway service road, and an entrance and exit from the northbound Whitestone Expressway to the northbound service road. In the Bronx, the bridge leads to the Hutchinson River Expressway (I-678). The expressway has exits and entrances in both directions to the Hutchinson River Expressway service roads, which in turn connect to Lafayette Avenue. The expressway continues north to the Bruckner Interchange, where I-678 ends and becomes the Hutchinson River Parkway; there are also connections to the Cross Bronx Expressway (I-95) and to Bruckner Expressway (I-278 and I-95).

As most trucks carrying over 80,000 lb (36,000 kg) have been prohibited from using the Throgs Neck Bridge (approximately 2 miles (3.2 km) east) since 2005, the Bronx–Whitestone Bridge is suggested as an alternative route for heavy trucks. Tractor-trailers exceeding 53 feet (16 m) and traveling between central Queens and the Bronx, as well as all heavy trucks over 53 feet that are banned from the Throgs Neck Bridge, are required to use the Bronx–Whitestone Bridge.

== History ==
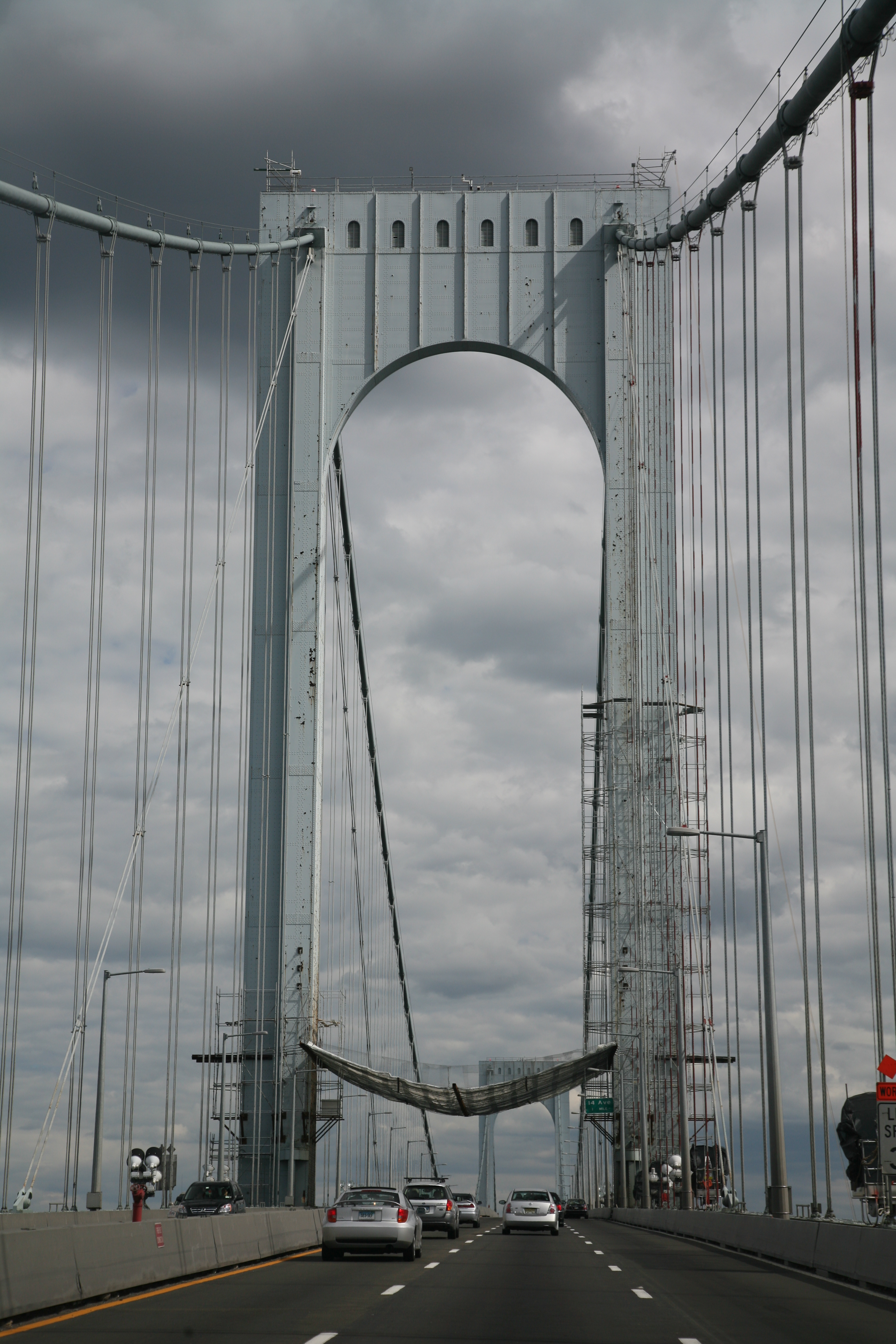
Roadway on the Bronx–Whitestone Bridge

The idea for a fixed crossing between Ferry Point at Clason Point, Bronx, and Whitestone Point at Whitestone, Queens, was first proposed in 1905 by real estate speculators who wanted to develop Whitestone. At the time, residents around the proposed area of the bridge protested construction in fear of losing the then-rural character of the community. Plans for the bridge were submitted to the Whitestone Improvement Association in 1909, but they were not acted upon. Queens public administrator Alfred J. Kennedy later recalled that in 1911, while he was in the New York State Assembly, he had proposed such a bridge but that his plan was "ridiculed".

In 1907, the Clason Point, College Point and Malba Ferry Company proposed a ferry route between Clason Point, Bronx, and Malba, Queens, close to the site of the planned bridge. The company was incorporated in 1909, and two years later it started constructing ferry terminals. Ferry operations between Clason Point and Malba began on July 2, 1914.

=== Development ===
==== Planning ====
In 1929, the Regional Plan Association (RPA) proposed a bridge from the Bronx to northern Queens to allow motorists from upstate New York and New England to reach Queens and Long Island without having to first travel through the traffic congestion in western Queens. The RPA believed that it was necessary to connect the proposed Belt Parkway (now Cross Island Parkway) on the Queens side with the Hutchinson River Parkway and Bruckner Boulevard on the Bronx side. The next year, urban planner Robert Moses formally proposed a Clason Point-to-Whitestone bridge as part of the Belt Parkway around Brooklyn and Queens. At the time, it was expected that the bridge would cost $25 million to construct.

In 1932, the New York City Board of Estimate started soliciting applications from private companies to build and operate the crossing as a toll bridge. One such application was made by Charles V. Bossert, who submitted his plan to the Board of Estimate in 1933. Bossert's plan went as far as U.S. Congress, where in 1935, a bill to approve the construction of Bossert's plan was introduced in the House of Representatives. However, the idea of a private company operating a publicly used toll bridge was unpopular, so it was dropped.

At the same time, the Queens Topological Bureau, Long Island State Park Commission, and Triborough Bridge Authority (TBA; later Triborough Bridge and Tunnel Authority, or TBTA) was conducting a study on the proposed Bronx–Whitestone Bridge. In 1935, the agencies jointly released a report on the connecting roads to be built as part of the bridge plans, and projected that the bridge would cost $20 million (equivalent to $383,869,000 in 2025). The bridge would directly link the Bronx, and other points on the mainland, to the 1939 New York World's Fair and to LaGuardia Airport (then known as North Beach Airport), both in Queens. In addition, the Whitestone Bridge was to provide congestion relief to the Triborough Bridge, further to the west, which also connected Queens to the Bronx. Real estate speculators predicted that the new bridge would also encourage development in the Bronx. New residential units in the Bronx were being planned before construction on the bridge itself even started. The RPA had also recommended that the Whitestone Bridge have rail connections, or space for such connections, but this would have required longer, shallower approach spans; Moses ultimately did not include any provisions for rail connections on the bridge.

==== Approval and land acquisition ====
In 1936, governor Herbert H. Lehman signed a bill that authorized the construction of the Bronx–Whitestone Bridge, which would connect Queens and the Bronx. The following January, Lehman signed a bill that allowed the TBA to issue bonds for the construction of the bridge. In February 1937, TBA chief engineer Othmar Ammann announced that the bridge was both "practical and necessary". Allston Dana was also hired as the engineer of design. The same month, approval of a suspension span between Ferry Point and Whitestone was given by Harry Hines Woodring, the United States Secretary of War. Around the same time, the TBA made plans to issue bonds to fund the construction of the Bronx–Whitestone Bridge. Moses recommended the TBA and the city should each be responsible for half of the bridge's $17.5 million cost.

In April 1937, the TBA started selling $25 million in bonds to fund the bridge's construction. A $1.13 million contract for the construction of the Bronx–Whitestone Bridge's towers was awarded in June 1937 to the American Bridge Company, which had beaten the only other competitor, Bethlehem Steel. The same month, the city started buying property that was in the right-of-way for the Whitestone Bridge and Parkway; shortly afterward, the rights-of-way for the bridge and parkway were legally designated. All of the TBA bonds had been sold by July 1937. The next month, the city had started evicting residents in the path of the bridge's approaches, and officials notified seventeen households in Whitestone that they had ten days to find new housing. This raised controversy because of the short notice given, but Moses said such measures were necessary to complete the bridge on schedule. In addition, land in Ferry Point was taken for the construction of the bridge; this land would become Ferry Point Park upon the completion of the bridge.

==== Construction ====
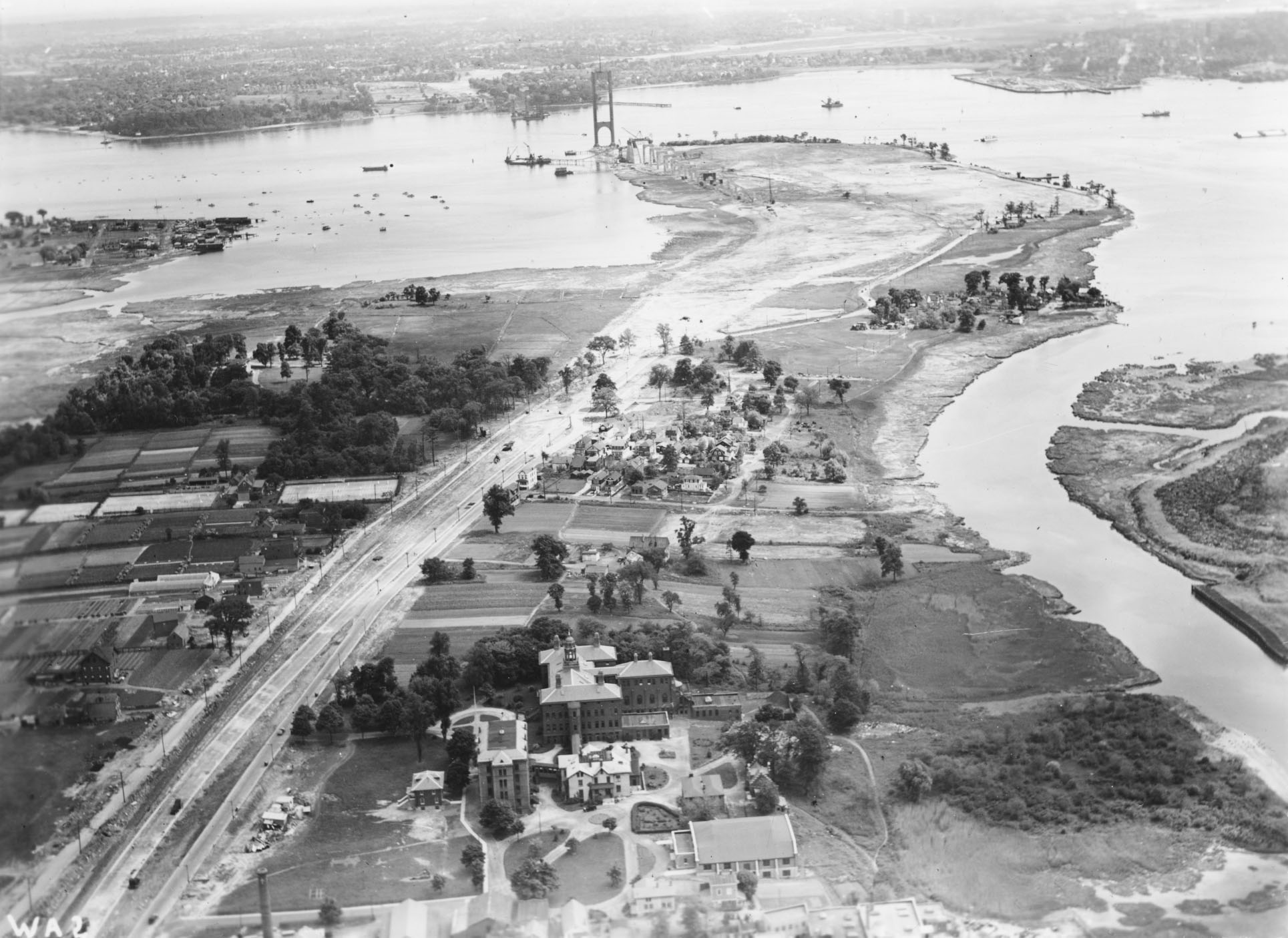
Construction progress c. 1938 looking southward from the Bronx

A groundbreaking ceremony was held in November 1937, when the Mayor of New York City, Fiorello H. La Guardia, laid the cornerstone for the bridge's Bronx anchorage. Construction on the Bronx–Whitestone Bridge, along with several other road-improvement projects, was sped up so that the regional road network would be ready in time for the 1939 World's Fair. To ensure that the bridge would be completed before the fair opened, the cofferdam for the Bronx tower had to be finished in February 1938, followed by the Queens tower in April 1938. Moses anticipated that the bridge and connecting roads would need to be complete by June 1, 1939. The project also included the construction of the Flushing River Lift Bridge, a drawbridge over the Flushing River a few miles south of the Bronx–Whitestone Bridge.

The four sections of each of the two suspension towers were assembled in only 18 days. The tower on the Bronx side was finished first, and in late May 1938, work began on the Queens tower. At the time, it was expected that the spinning of the suspension cables would begin that September. By the first week of July 1938, the TBA reported that both of the Bronx–Whitestone Bridge's towers were completed, and that the bridge was on schedule to open on April 30, 1939, ahead of schedule. In addition, the construction of connecting roadways on the Queens and Bronx sides of the bridge was being sped up. The Bronx side of the bridge would connect to the Hutchinson River Parkway, while the Queens side would connect to the Whitestone and Cross Island Parkways.

The process of spinning the bridge's cables commenced in September 1938. The first cable, which contained 266 strands, was completed within a week. The suspender cables were completed within 41 days. That October, work started on the Cross Island Parkway approach to the bridge in Queens. The bridge's opening date was formalized in January 1939, and the last girder was installed on February 13, 1939. Afterward, the construction of the approach roads was sped up in anticipation of the 1939 World's Fair. During construction, one worker died when he fell off the bridge deck. There was another incident in August 1938 in which a 35-ton steel girder dropped from the side of the Whitestone Bridge, though no one was severely injured. The bridge ultimately cost either $17.785 million (equal to about $412 million in 2025) or $19.6 million (equal to about $454 million in 2025).

=== Opening ===
The Bronx–Whitestone Bridge opened on April 29, 1939, with Moses and La Guardia leading a ceremony of 4,000 people. Both the Whitestone and College Point neighborhoods had celebrations for the new project, which Moses described as a "logical and inevitable part of the Belt Parkway program". The bridge featured pedestrian walkways and four lanes of vehicular traffic, and passenger vehicles were initially charged 25 cents. The 2,300-foot (700 m) center span was the fourth longest in the world at the opening, behind the Golden Gate Bridge, the George Washington Bridge, and the double spans of the San Francisco–Oakland Bay Bridge. The bridge's opening, two months earlier than originally scheduled, coincided with the first day of the 1939 World's Fair.

A custom model of lampposts, the "Whitestone" or Type 41 lamppost, was made for the bridge. The lamppost model was later installed on other roads, though it was longer being actively installed by the 1960s, and only a few such lamps remained as of 2013. In preparation for the 1939 World's Fair, amber street lights were installed on the bridge's approach roads, as well as other key corridors around the city. These lamps were distinctly colored so motorists headed to the fair could follow them while driving. At its north end, the Bronx–Whitestone Bridge was to connect with Eastern Boulevard (later known as Bruckner Boulevard) via the Hutchinson River Parkway. At its south end, the bridge was to connect with the new Whitestone Parkway, which led southwest off the bridge to Northern Boulevard. The connection between the Bronx–Whitestone Bridge and Whitestone Parkway opened in November 1940, while the Hutchinson River Parkway between Pelham Bay Park and the bridge opened in October 1941. The Whitestone and Hutchinson River parkways intersected Bruckner Boulevard at a traffic circle, where congestion worsened over subsequent decades until the Bruckner Interchange replaced the circle in the 1970s. On the Queens side, an extension of Francis Lewis Boulevard opened in November 1939, connecting northeastern Queens with the new bridge, while the Cross Island Parkway approach opened in June 1940.

La Guardia said the bridge could carry up to 4,000 cars per hour in each direction. Within the first two months of the Bronx–Whitestone Bridge's opening, it had carried just over a million vehicles, and the bridge was collecting an average of $4,232 a day in tolls. In 1940, the American Institute of Steel Construction recognized the Bronx–Whitestone Bridge as the "most beautiful monumental steel bridge completed during the last year". Additionally, two parks were opened following the bridge's completion. A 10-acre (4.0 ha) park under the Queens side of the Bronx–Whitestone Bridge, named for Declaration of Independence signatory Francis Lewis, was opened in 1940. On the Bronx side, the blueprint for Ferry Point Park had been developed in conjunction with the bridge's construction, and additional facilities were added in the early 1940s.

=== Truss installation ===
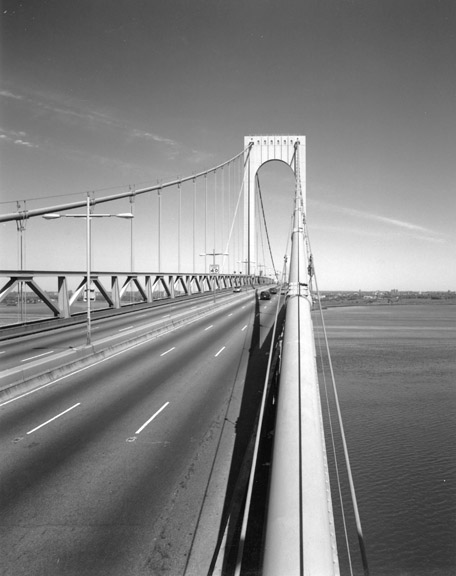
View of the roadway and a tower, showing stiffening trusses

As early as June 1938, engineers observed oscillations in the Whitestone Bridge's deck. Concerns grew after the original Tacoma Narrows Bridge in Tacoma, Washington, collapsed during heavy winds in November 1940. It had employed an 8-foot (2.4 m)-deep girder system, much like the 11-foot (3.4 m) I-beam girders of the Bronx–Whitestone Bridge. However, the Whitestone Bridge was shorter and wider than the Tacoma Narrows Bridge. The Bronx–Whitestone Bridge's deck was also thicker than that of the Tacoma Narrows Bridge, which was only 8 feet (2.4 m) thick to the Bronx–Whitestone Bridge's 11 feet (3.4 m). Overall, the Bronx–Whitestone Bridge was less prone to oscillation and critical failure, as it was not as flimsy as the Tacoma Narrows Bridge. After performing a series of experiments on the bridge's design, Ammann concluded that additional measures to stiffen the Whitestone Bridge were unnecessary. A Princeton University professor separately created a model of the bridge, finding that the Whitestone Bridge's main span could still oscillate in as many as three segments.

Even so, the public was scared by the fact that the two bridges were similar in design, and this led to a belief that the Whitestone Bridge might be unstable, as Moses later related. Shortly after the Tacoma Narrows Bridge collapse, Moses announced that steel cable stays would be installed on the bridge's towers to reduce oscillation. To mitigate the risk of failure from high winds, eight stay cables, two on each side of both suspension towers, were proposed for installation. The stays were supposed to be completed in January 1941. Although $1 million was initially allocated for the bridge-stiffening project, construction was deferred due to material and labor shortages during World War II.

Planning for the project resumed in September 1945 at the end of the war, and a low bidder for the project was announced that October. The project's primary goal was to reinforce the bridge with trusses, thus ensuring the bridge's stability. The four lanes of roadway traffic were widened to six lanes, with the two additional lanes replacing the pedestrian walkways on each side. On both sides of the deck, 14-foot (4.3 m)-high steel trusses were installed to weigh down and stiffen the bridge in an effort to reduce oscillation. The stiffening project was completed in 1947. The bridge was repainted in 1953, and large overhead signs were installed on the bridge the same year to direct motorists toward the Whitestone and Cross Island parkways.

=== Increases in traffic ===
By the late 1950s, the Bronx–Whitestone Bridge was carrying nearly 30 million vehicles a year. Concurrently, the Whitestone Parkway and the portion of the Hutchinson River Parkway between the bridge and the Bruckner Interchange were converted to Interstate Highway standards. The Whitestone Parkway became the Whitestone Expressway, and the upgraded part of the Hutchinson River Parkway became the Hutchinson River Expressway. In addition, the Van Wyck Expressway between John F. Kennedy International Airport and Kew Gardens was extended northward to connect with the Whitestone Expressway and the Bronx–Whitestone Bridge. By 1966, the Bronx–Whitestone Bridge had been designated as part of Interstate 678, along with the Whitestone Expressway. These highway upgrades were performed in preparation for the 1964 New York World's Fair, which was also held in Flushing Meadows-Corona Park.

Also by the 1950s, the Bronx–Whitestone Bridge was nearing its traffic capacity because it was the easternmost crossing of the East River between the Bronx and Queens. To alleviate traffic loads on the Bronx–Whitestone Bridge, planning for the Throgs Neck Bridge to the east, started in 1955, and construction of that bridge began in 1957. After the Throgs Neck Bridge opened in 1961, the Bronx–Whitestone Bridge recorded a corresponding 40% decline in traffic; according to a TBTA executive, traffic on the bridge ultimately decreased by more than half. Soon afterward, the 1964 World's Fair resulted in an increase in traffic on the Bronx–Whitestone Bridge. In 1968, a heavy storm with winds of up to 80 miles per hour (130 km/h) caused the Bronx–Whitestone Bridge's deck to bounce, though the additional trusses helped to reduce vertical movements. No one was injured, and officials stated that the bridge was not in danger of collapsing during the storm.

In the long run, use of the bridge continued to grow. By the bridge's 40th anniversary in 1979, there were about 31 million vehicles using the bridge annually. The bridge had recorded a total of 858 million vehicular crossings over its lifetime. By 1985, the Bronx–Whitestone Bridge carried 35 million vehicles annually, more than the 33 million recorded in 1960, before the Throgs Neck Bridge had opened as an alternate route. There had been several plans to build a Long Island Sound bridge east of the Bronx–Whitestone and Throgs Neck bridges to relieve traffic on these crossings, although such a bridge remained unbuilt in the 21st century. After concrete debris fell from the bridge's Queens approach viaduct in 1985, the TBTA repaired the approach. Upon the bridge's 50th anniversary in 1989, a New York Times writer said: "The Bronx-Whitestone Bridge amounted to soaring evidence that dreams can come true."

=== Major repairs ===
In March 1990, the TBTA announced that the Bronx–Whitestone Bridge would undergo a $20.3 million refurbishment. The anchorages, roadways, and drainage were to be repaired during off-peak hours for two years. Actual work took place between December 1989 and December 1991. As the Throgs Neck Bridge was being repaired simultaneously, this caused major traffic jams at both bridges. During the renovation, the bridge's expansion joints were replaced by the American Bridge Company, which had originally built the suspension towers. However, in 1993, the sealant around the joints was observed to be deteriorating, necessitating additional repairs.

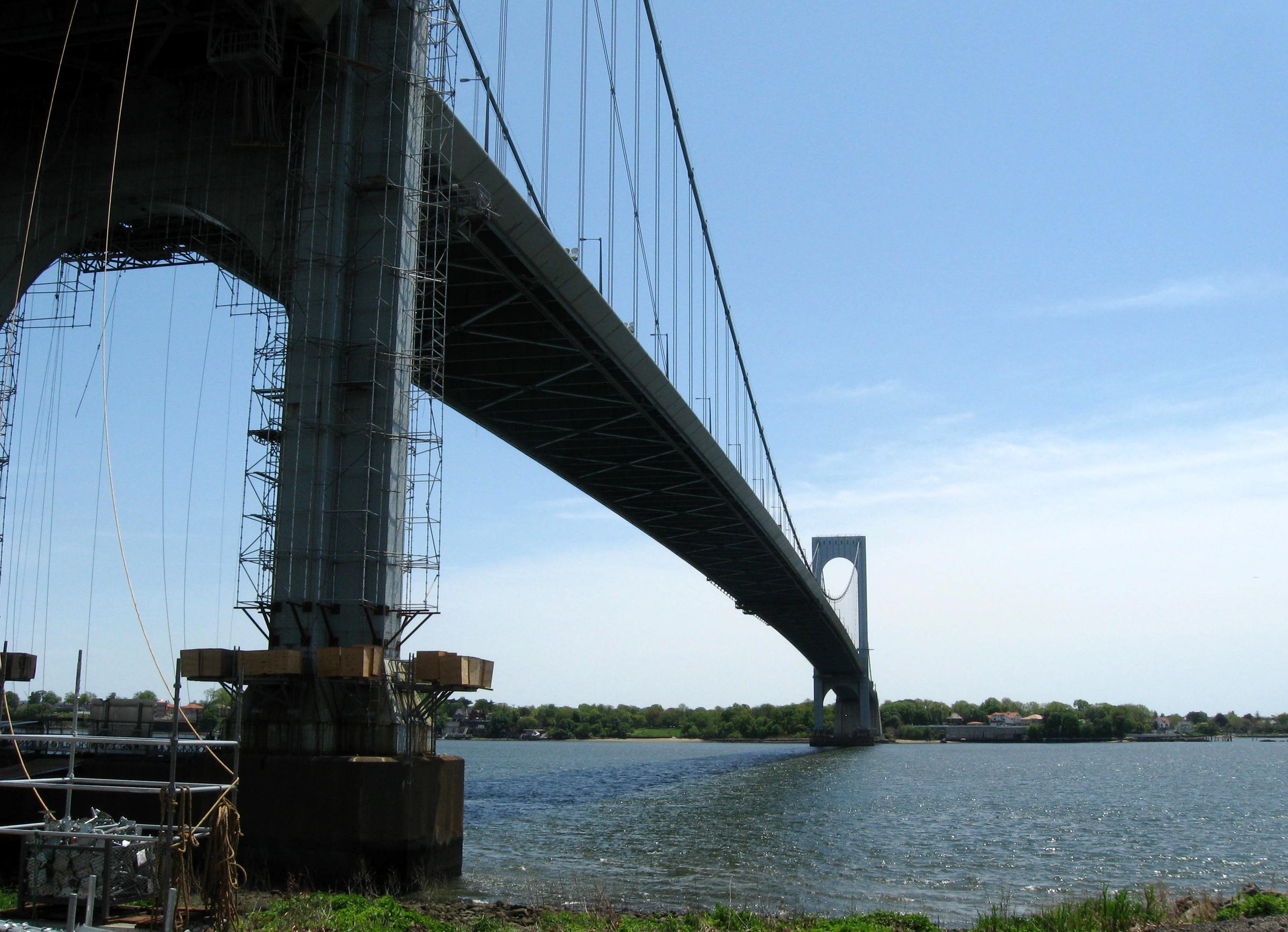
Seen from under the Bronx suspension tower

By 2001, the TBTA's successor Metropolitan Transportation Authority (MTA) planned to spend $286 million in bridge renovations. In 2003, the MTA restored the classic lines of the bridge by removing the stiffening trusses and installing fiberglass fairing along both sides of the road deck. The lightweight fiberglass fairing is triangular in shape, giving it an aerodynamic profile that allows crosswinds to flow through the bridge rather than hit the trusses. The removal of the trusses and other changes to the decking reduced the bridge's weight by 6,000 tons, accounting for some 25% of the mass suspended by the cables, In addition, with the truss removals, the Bronx–Whitestone Bridge was able to withstand crosswinds of up to 150 miles per hour (240 km/h), whereas the trusses could resist crosswinds of no more than 50 miles per hour (80 km/h). The truss removal project also involved upgrading the lighting systems, including the bridge's lightbulbs and the beacons atop the suspension towers, as well as replacing the sprinkler and electrical systems.

In 2005, it was announced that the bridge's deck had to be replaced with a new steel orthotropic deck composed of prefabricated panels. One lane at a time needed to be closed and replaced, so as to minimize traffic disruptions. During the deck replacement, five lanes were kept open at all times using a movable barrier, with three Bronx-bound lanes during the morning rush hour and three Queens-bound lanes during the evening rush. Other renovations included adding mass dampers to stabilize the bridge deck; repainting the two towers and the bridge deck; and installing variable-message signs. The deck replacement was completed by 2007. However, cracks were soon observed in some of the new panels, and by 2014, cracks had been observed in 66 of 408 panels, necessitating approximately 1,000 feet (300 m) of rib welds. The renovations were intended to extend the Bronx–Whitestone Bridge's lifespan indefinitely. These improvements also accommodated the bridge's high traffic volumes: by 2008, the bridge was being used by an average of 120,000 vehicles a day, amounting to 43 million crossings that year.

The Queens and Bronx approaches were replaced in a project that started in 2008. As part of the project, each of the approaches' lanes was widened to 12 feet (3.7 m). The replacement of the bridge's approaches involved replacing 15 supporting piers and 1,785 feet (544 m) of roadway on the Bronx side, as well as 1,010 feet (310 m) of viaduct on the Queens side, which helped support the wider lanes. The contract for the Bronx viaduct replacement was awarded in 2008, and it was completed in late 2012 at a cost of $212 million. The replacement of the Queens approach, which cost $109 million, was completed in May 2015. During the renovation of that approach, the exit from northbound I-678 to Third Avenue was closed and rehabilitated.

== Tolls ==
As of January 4, 2026, drivers pay $12.03 per car or $5.06 per motorcycle for tolls by mail/non-NYCSC E-Z Pass. E-ZPass users with transponders issued by the New York E‑ZPass Customer Service Center pay $7.46 per car or $3.25 per motorcycle. Mid-Tier NYCSC E-Z Pass users pay $9.79 per car or $4.18 per motorcycle. All E-ZPass users with transponders not issued by the New York E-ZPass CSC will be required to pay Toll-by-mail rates.

The toll plaza of the Bronx–Whitestone Bridge, located on the Bronx side, originally contained 10 toll lanes but was later expanded. Four self-service toll-collection machines were installed at the Bronx–Whitestone Bridge during the 1950s, but they were removed in 1959 because motorists repeatedly dropped their coins at the machines. E-ZPass was introduced at the Bronx–Whitestone Bridge in June 1996. Initially, the bridge's toll plaza contained three E-ZPass/cash lanes in each direction to reduce confusion; this contrasted with the Throgs Neck Bridge, where confusion between the E-ZPass-only lanes and cash-only lanes had caused congestion.

Open-road cashless tolling began on September 30, 2017. The tollbooths, which were at the Bronx end of the bridge, were dismantled, and drivers are no longer able to pay cash at the bridge. Instead, cameras and E-ZPass readers are mounted on new overhead gantries manufactured by TransCore near where the booths were located. A vehicle without E-ZPass has a picture taken of its license plate and a bill for the toll is mailed to its owner. For E-ZPass users, sensors detect their transponders wirelessly.

=== Historical tolls ===
Historical passenger tolls for the Bronx–Whitestone Bridge (Note: This table lists the peak tolls for two-axle vehicles. Motorcycle tolls and off-peak tolls are lower, and tolls for vehicles with additional axles are higher.)
Years	Toll		Toll equivalent in 2025		Ref.
Years	Cash	E-ZPass	Cash	E-ZPass	Ref.
1939–1972	$0.25	—N/a	$5.79–5.75	—N/a	
1972–1975	$0.50	—N/a	$2.99–3.85	—N/a	
1975–1980	$0.75	—N/a	$2.93–4.49	—N/a	
1980–1982	$1.00	—N/a	$3.34–3.91	—N/a	
1982–1984	$1.25	—N/a	$3.87–4.17	—N/a	
1984–1986	$1.50	—N/a	$4.49–4.41	—N/a	
1986–1987	$1.75	—N/a	$4.96–5.14	—N/a	
1987–1989	$2.00	—N/a	$5.19–5.67	—N/a	
1989–1993	$2.50	—N/a	$5.57–6.49	—N/a	
1993–1996	$3.00	—N/a	$6.16–6.69	—N/a	
1996–2003	$3.50	$3.50	$6.13–7.18	$6.13–7.18	
2003–2005	$4.00	$4.00	$6.59–7.00	$6.59–7.00	
2005–2008	$4.50	$4.00	$6.73–7.42	$5.98–6.59	
2008–2010	$5.00	$4.15	$7.38–7.48	$6.13–6.21	
2010–2015	$6.50	$4.80	$8.83–9.60	$6.52–7.09	
2015–2017	$8.00	$5.54	$10.51–10.87	$7.28–7.52	
2017–2019	$8.50	$5.76	$10.70–11.16	$7.25–7.57	
2019–2021	$9.50	$6.12	$11.29–11.96	$7.27–7.71	
2021–2023	$10.17	$6.55	$10.75–12.08	$6.92–7.78	
2023–2026	$11.19	$6.94	$11.19–11.82	$6.94–7.33	
2026–present	$12.03	$7.46	$12.03	$7.46	

== Public transportation ==
The bridge carries two MTA Regional Bus Operations routes, the Q44 SBS operated by MTA New York City Transit, and the Q50 Limited (formerly part of the QBx1), operated by the MTA Bus Company.

After the removal of the sidewalks starting in 1943, bicyclists were able to use QBx1 buses of the Queens Surface Corporation, which could carry bicycles on the front-mounted bike racks. However, since the Metropolitan Transportation Authority absorbed the bus routes formerly operated by Queens Surface, the bike racks were eliminated. In April 1994, bike racks were installed onto QBx1 buses, but the bike-on-bus program was eliminated on February 27, 2005, the same day as the MTA's takeover of the QBx1 route. After the QBx1 was replaced by the Q50, the MTA reintroduced bike racks on Q50 buses in early 2018.

== See also ==
- Lists of crossings of the East River
- List of bridges documented by the Historic American Engineering Record in New York
