= Interstate 678 =

Highway in New York

Interstate 678
- Map of the New York City area with I-678 highlighted in red

Route information
- Auxiliary route of I-78
- Maintained by NYSDOT, MTAB&T, and PANYNJ
- Length: 14.33 mi (23.06 km)
- Existed: c. 1965–present
- NHS: Entire route

Major junctions
- South end: John F. Kennedy Airport
- NY 27 / NY 878 / Belt Parkway in South Ozone Park; NY 25 in Kew Gardens; Grand Central Parkway / Jackie Robinson Parkway in Kew Gardens Hills; I-495 in Flushing Meadows Park; NY 25A / Whitestone Expressway in Willets Point; Cross Island Parkway in Whitestone
- North end: I-95 / I-295 / I-278 / Hutchinson River Parkway in Throggs Neck

Location
- Country: United States
- State: New York
- Counties: Queens, Bronx

Highway system
- Interstate Highway System; Main; Auxiliary; Suffixed; Business; Future; New York Highways; Interstate; US; State; Reference; Parkways
← NY 635	→ I-684

Interstate 678 (I-678) is a north–south auxiliary Interstate Highway that extends for 14 miles (23 km) through two boroughs of New York City. The route begins at John F. Kennedy International Airport on Jamaica Bay and travels north through Queens and across the East River to the Bruckner Interchange in the Bronx, where I-678 ends and the Hutchinson River Parkway begins.

I-678 connects to I-495 (the Long Island Expressway) in Flushing Meadows–Corona Park. The highway is known as the Van Wyck Expressway (/væn ˈwɪk/ van WIK or /væn ˈwaɪk/ van WYKE) from JFK Airport to Northern Boulevard (New York State Route 25A or NY 25A), the Whitestone Expressway from NY 25A north to the Bronx–Whitestone Bridge, and the Hutchinson River Expressway from the bridge to the Bruckner Interchange. North of the interchange, I-678 ends and the roadway continues as the Hutchinson River Parkway.

The portion of I-678 north of NY 25A follows the path of the Whitestone Parkway and a short section of the Hutchinson River Parkway's Bronx extension. The Whitestone and Hutchinson River parkways were first opened in 1939, while the Van Wyck Expressway opened in pieces between 1950 and 1953. Both highways were connected to each other and upgraded to meet Interstate Highway standards in the early 1960s. The Hutchinson River and Whitestone Expressways were collectively designated as I-678 c. 1965. The designation was extended southward in 1970 to follow the Van Wyck Expressway to its end at JFK Airport.

== Route description ==
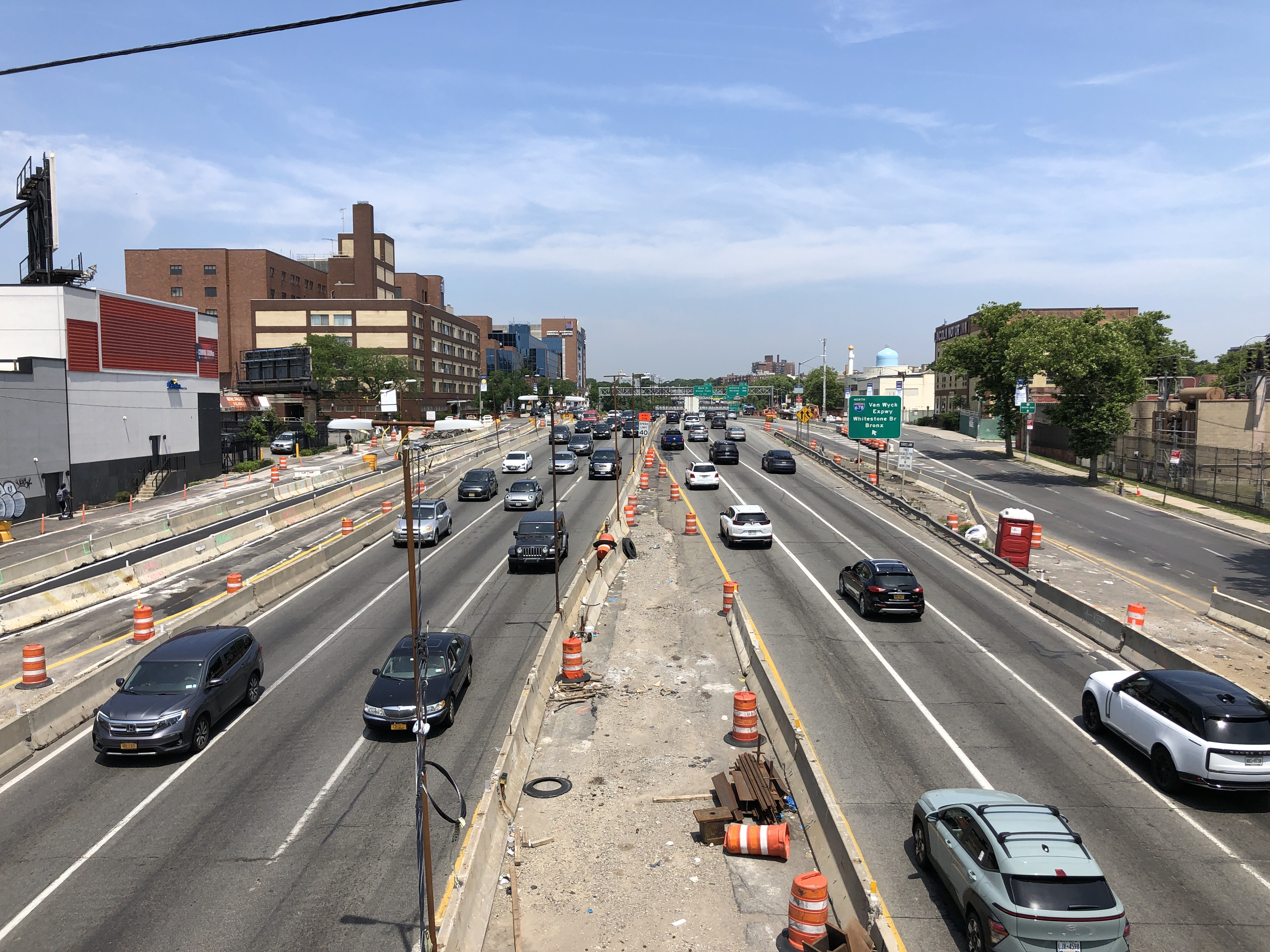
I-678 in Jamaica as seen from the Long Island Rail Road tracks

I-678 begins at JFK Airport in the borough of Queens and proceeds along the stretch of highway known as the Van Wyck Expressway. I-678 progresses westward through the airport, crossing under airport taxiways as a six-lane freeway. Just after the taxiways, the expressway connects with North Service Road, which services the airport's western services. From there, the expressway begins to turn northward and crosses the United Airlines hangar. I-678 continues its northwestern path, curving to the northeast at the interchange with Federal Circle. From there, the highway continues northward, becoming a divided highway and meeting NY 878 (the Nassau Expressway) at exit 1E. I-678 continues northward to the Kennedy Airport Interchange, where it crosses under the Nassau Expressway and over NY 27 east (South Conduit Avenue) and the Belt Parkway, and then over NY 27 west (North Conduit Avenue) at exit 1B. At this point the highway exits the facility of JFK Airport and maintenance switches to the New York State Department of Transportation.

North of North Conduit Avenue, AirTrain JFK's elevated people mover structure begins to run above the expressway's median, and the Van Wyck descends to an open-cut structure. At this point, I-678 gains service roads on either side, connecting to local streets. I-678 continues northward along the Van Wyck Expressway through Queens, interchanging with Rockaway Boulevard, Linden Boulevard, Liberty Avenue, and Atlantic Avenue at exits 2 through 5, respectively. It also gains a high-occupancy vehicle lane in both directions, which runs for the next 4.3 miles (6.9 km). Just south of Atlantic Avenue, the AirTrain structure diverges to the east. After entering Jamaica, the Van Wyck crosses under a complex, two-level Long Island Rail Road structure with 13 tracks.

Continuing northward, the expressway passes Jamaica Hospital Medical Center and intersects Jamaica Avenue at exit 6. I-678 expands to eight lanes as it crosses under Hillside Avenue (NY 25B), which is serviced by exit 7 in the southbound direction. A short distance later, the highway approaches a large interchange with NY 25 (Queens Boulevard) and Main Street at exits 8–9. After crossing under Hoover Avenue, I-678 enters the Kew Gardens Interchange, a complex interchange with traffic from five directions, where the HOV lane ends. I-678 crosses on overpasses over Union Turnpike, the Grand Central Parkway, the Jackie Robinson Parkway, and different interchange ramps before returning at-grade in Flushing. There, the highway turns northwestward once again, interchanging with Jewel Avenue via Park Drive East at exit 11. Crossing through Flushing Meadows–Corona Park, I-678 continues northward until exit 12, where there are ramps to College Point Boulevard and the westbound Long Island Expressway (I-495). After the interchange with the Long Island Expressway, the Van Wyck continues northeastward. A short distance later, the expressway crosses under Roosevelt Avenue and the IRT Flushing Line (7 and <7> trains) of the New York City Subway. After crossing Roosevelt Avenue, I-678 passes Citi Field to the west, then intersects NY 25A (Northern Boulevard) and the Whitestone Expressway at the Flushing River Interchange, via exit 13. At this point, I-678 transitions onto the Whitestone Expressway.

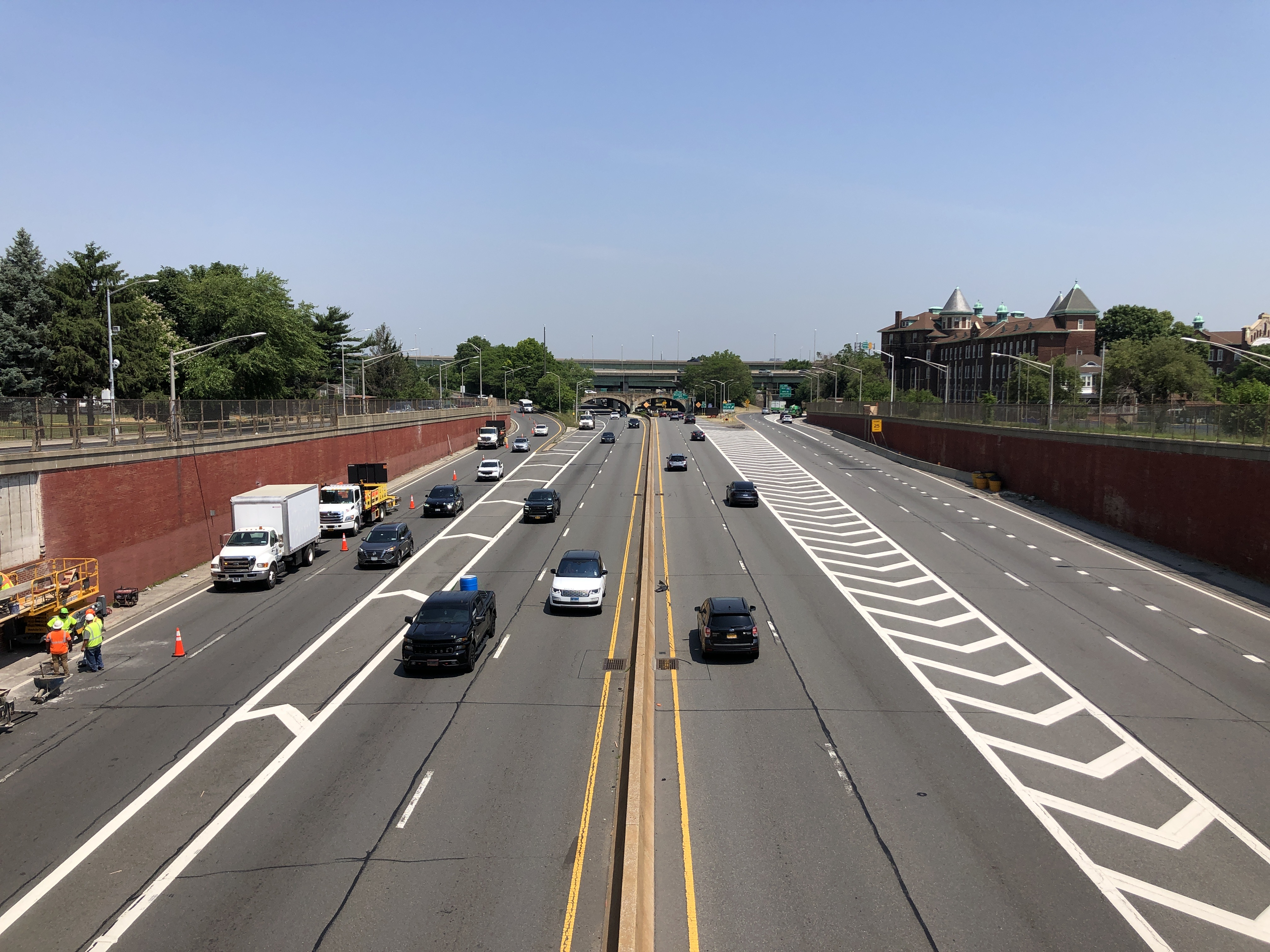
I-678 northbound approaching the Bruckner Interchange

The Whitestone Expressway continues northward into College Point, where the service roads resume. I-678 passes over Linden Place, served by exit 14, and continues northeastward past the distribution center of The New York Times to the west. Shortly afterward, I-678's service roads intersect with 20th Avenue in Whitestone, and there are ramps to and from the service roads at exit 15. I-678 passes under 14th Avenue a short distance to the north. Just after 14th Avenue, the lefthand lanes of both directions diverge to exit 16, which continues onto Cross Island Parkway via a left exit. The service roads end at this point.

After the interchange with Cross Island Parkway, the Whitestone Expressway turns to the northwest as a six-lane expressway that passes through Whitestone. After exit 17, which serves 3rd Avenue, the expressway passes over Francis Lewis Park and begins its approach onto the Whitestone Bridge over the East River. The highway leaves Queens and enters the Bronx along the bridge. The bridge descends to ground level and I-678 passes through an open-road toll gantry, which is located at the former site of a tollbooth. Afterward, the expressway intersects Lafayette Avenue. North of Lafayette Avenue is the Bruckner Interchange, where I-678's designation ends and the highway continues northward as the Hutchinson River Parkway.

== History ==
=== Whitestone Parkway ===
In 1936, New York governor Herbert H. Lehman signed a bill that authorized the construction of the Bronx–Whitestone Bridge, which would connect Queens and the Bronx. At its north end, the Bronx–Whitestone Bridge would connect to Eastern Boulevard (later known as Bruckner Boulevard) via the Hutchinson River Parkway. The bridge's south end would connect to a new Whitestone Parkway, which led southwest off the bridge to Northern Boulevard. Just south of the bridge, there was to be a three-level interchange between the Whitestone Parkway and the Cross Island Parkway. Plans for the bridge were completed by February 1937, at which time the state started issuing bonds to fund bridge construction. The right-of-way for the Whitestone Bridge and Parkway was legally designated in July 1937.

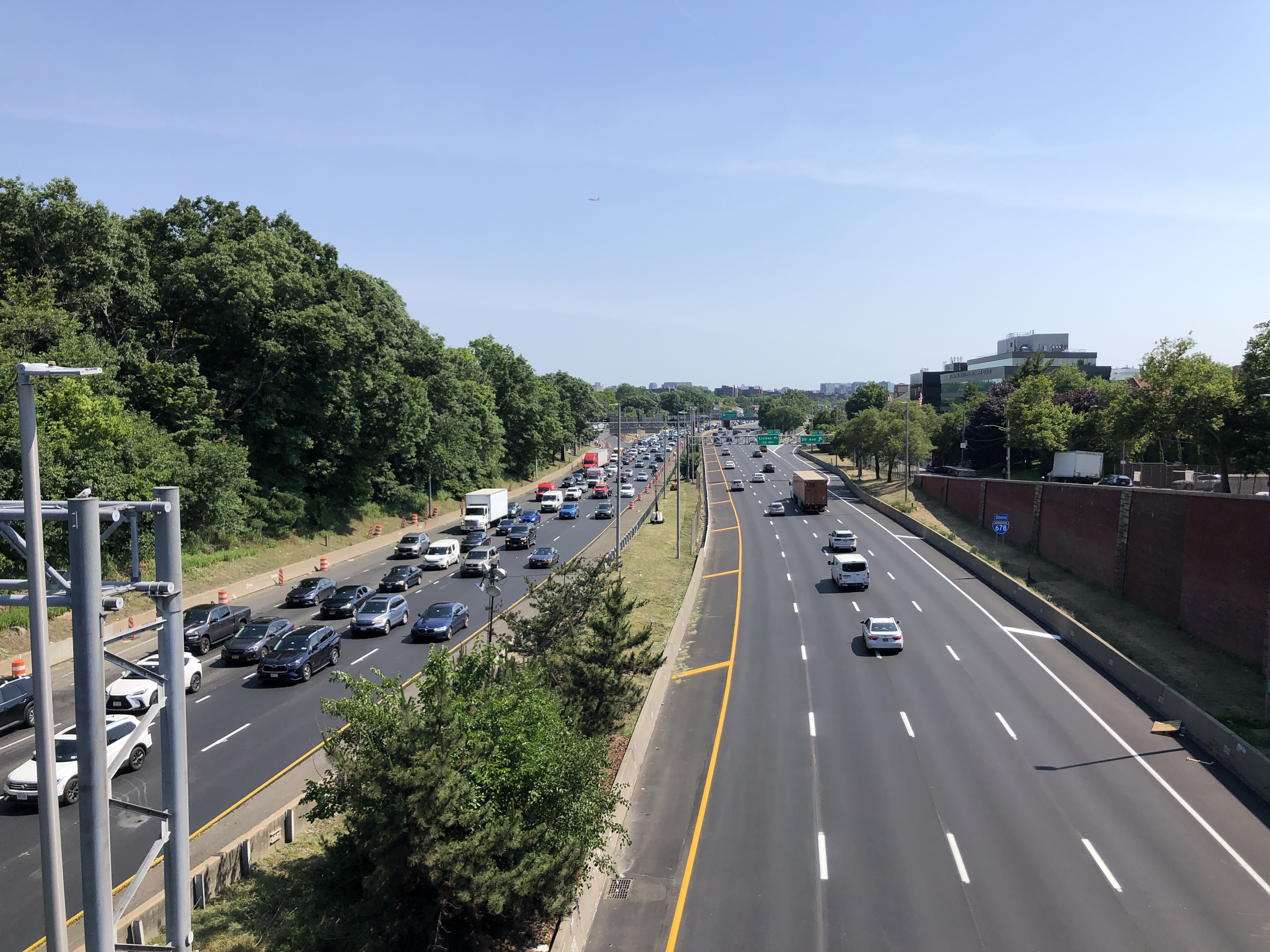
I-678 (Whitestone Expressway) southbound at 14th Avenue

The Whitestone Bridge and Parkway both opened on April 29, 1939. Construction on the bridge and parkway had been accelerated in preparation for the 1939 New York World's Fair, which opened one day after the Whitestone Bridge and Parkway. The new highway was intended as a major thoroughfare to the World's Fair, which was hosted in Flushing Meadows–Corona Park, near the Whitestone Parkway's southern end. In 1953, work began on an interchange between Willets Point Boulevard, Northern Boulevard, and Whitestone Parkway, at the parkway's southern end.

=== Van Wyck Expressway ===
In the 1940s, Robert Moses proposed the construction of a system of highways that would traverse the New York City area. The plan was to cost $800 million (equivalent to $14.4 billion in 2025), and, in 1945, the city agreed to pay $60 million (equivalent to $849 million in 2025) of that cost. Among them was the Van Wyck Expressway, which would stretch from Idlewild Airport (now JFK Airport) in the south to Queens Boulevard in the north. The six-lane expressway was to be built along the path of what was then Van Wyck Boulevard, and it was to cost $11.65 million. The original street and the freeway were both named after former New York City mayor Robert Anderson Van Wyck, but the pronunciation of "Wyck" was heavily disputed: depending on the person, "Wyck" could rhyme with either "lick" or "like". The Van Wyck Expressway was to be built to higher standards than New York's parkways, as it was intended to handle truck traffic. The highway would contain three lanes in each direction, as well as cobblestone shoulders. Several parks and playgrounds were also built along the expressway's route.

In 1946, the city started relocating or demolishing houses in the proposed expressway's right-of-way. The city had acquired 355 houses in the expressway's path, and it ultimately relocated 263 households, as well as the Van Wyck Avenue Congregational Church. In some cases, the city government placed existing houses on trailers and rolled them to vacant sites nearby, allowing residents to move back into their houses in as little as 24 to 48 hours. One four-story apartment building, which housed 35 families, was placed on metal rollers and relocated away from the expressway's path. Normally, new houses would have been built for these families, but there was not enough land to build individual homes for these families. After some of the houses were relocated, they were sold to military veterans at reduced prices. The first major contract for the Van Wyck Expressway's construction was awarded in September 1947, when Rusciano and Son was contracted to build retaining walls and utilities along the expressway's right of way.

Construction was delayed several times; the state government had rejected bids for several major contracts, saying the bids were too high. One of the most complex aspects of the project was the replacement of an overpass carrying the Long Island Rail Road (LIRR) near the Jamaica station. The LIRR overpass alone cost $3.2 million, as contractors could not interrupt service on the LIRR corridor, which carried 1,635 trains every twenty-four hours. The final construction contract for the Van Wyck's first segment was awarded in January 1950. The segment from Queens Boulevard to Idlewild ultimately cost $17 million. It opened on October 14, 1950, with a ceremony attended by New York governor Thomas E. Dewey. The new highway reduced driving time between Idlewild and Manhattan by 20 percent. Later the same year, the Gull Construction Company was contracted to install "safety plantings" in the median, consisting of shrubs and trees, to separate the different directions of traffic. New York state officials announced in 1960 that they would install a Jersey barrier in the Van Wyck's median, replacing the plantings, which had not been effective in preventing crashes.

In April 1949, Dewey signed a contract authorizing a northward extension of the highway to Grand Central Parkway. This segment was to cost $11.6 million. The project included widening a segment of Grand Central Parkway between Horace Harding Boulevard (today's Long Island Expressway) and the Kew Gardens Interchange. In addition, a ramp was built from Main Street to the Van Wyck Expressway, and an overpass was built to carry Queens Boulevard above both Main Street and the highway. The Gull Construction Company received the contract for the segment of the highway between Hoover Avenue and 88th Avenue in September 1950. A direct ramp from the northbound Van Wyck to Queens Boulevard opened in June 1953; prior to the opening of this segment, the northbound expressway was frequently congested. The extension to Grand Central Parkway opened on November 13, 1953, but the ramps from the Van Wyck Expressway to Main Street were delayed for another year, opening in November 1954.

=== 1964 World's Fair upgrades ===
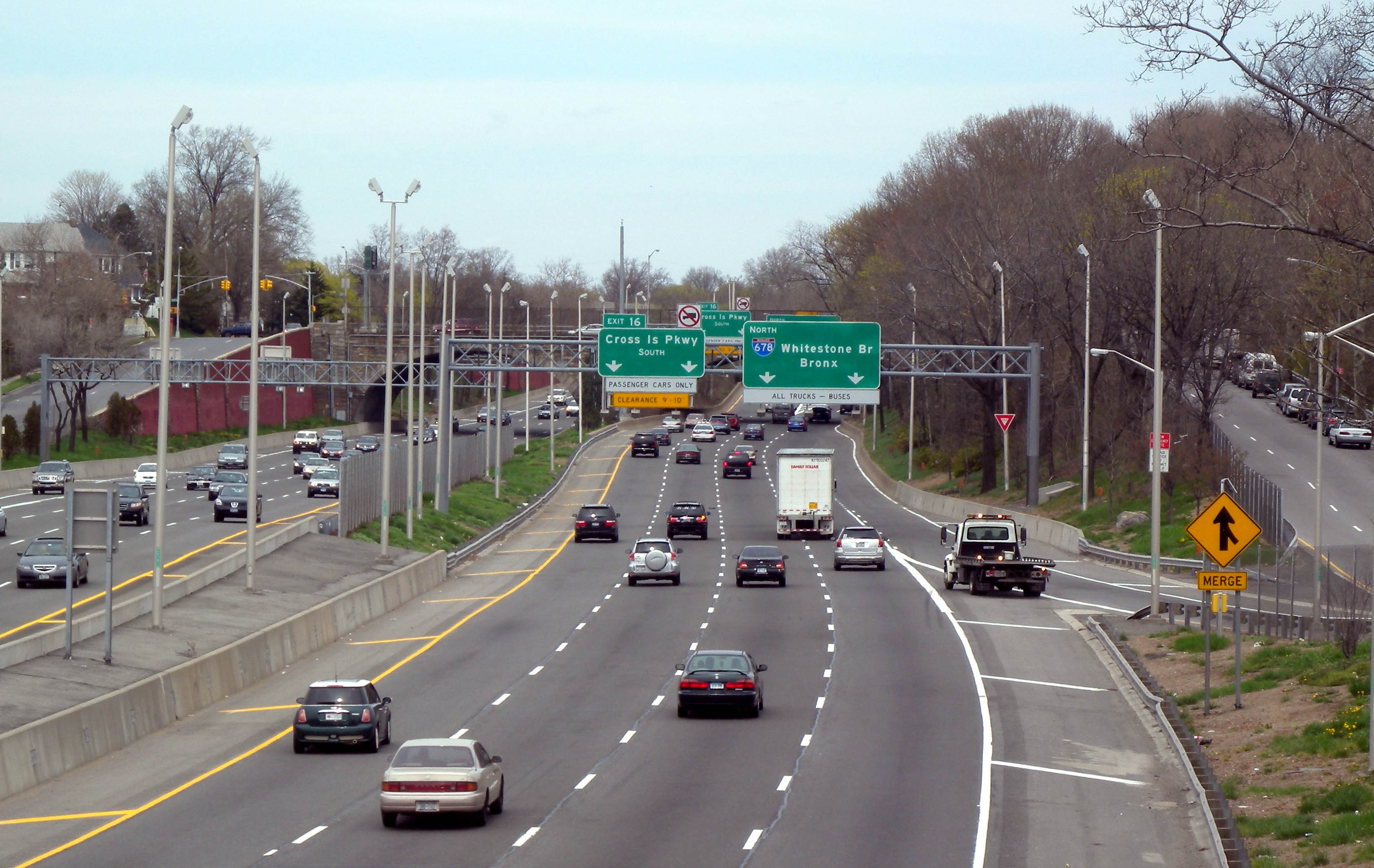
I-678 exit 16 in College Point

In December 1957, the state approved a $9.5 million (equivalent to $83.1 million in 2025) project to widen a 2.1-mile (3.4 km) segment of Whitestone Parkway from Northern Boulevard to the Bronx–Whitestone Bridge, build a new bridge over the Flushing River, and improve the parkway to Interstate Highway standards using funds from the Federal-Aid Highway Act of 1956, in which the federal government would pay 90 percent of the proposed highway's cost. The parkway would be expanded from two to four lanes in each direction, and the interchange with the Cross Island Parkway would also be upgraded. The design process for the upgrade was nearing completion when the state approved the project. Moses, as the head of the Triborough Bridge and Tunnel Authority (TBTA), stated that the upgrade could start in 1960. At the time of the announcement, the junction with Northern Boulevard was heavily congested because motorists used local streets to connect to the Grand Central Parkway, opposite Flushing Meadows Park from the Whitestone Parkway. In early 1959, Moses formally asked the United States Army Corps of Engineers for permission to close the existing Flushing River drawbridge permanently. The drawbridge would then be upgraded to Interstate standards, and a second, fixed span would be built adjacent to the drawbridge. Several boat operators initially opposed the plans—the bridges would be 40.8 feet (12.4 m) above mean high water, shorter than some of the vessels that used the creek—but they eventually withdrew their opposition.

Flushing Meadows Park was subsequently selected to host the 1964 New York World's Fair. In advance of the World's Fair, city officials announced in early 1960 that they would upgrade the Whitestone Parkway and extend the Van Wyck Expressway northward to the Whitestone Expressway. City officials approved a $10 million (equivalent to $83.3 million in 2025) project to upgrade the Whitestone Parkway in May 1960, and work on the parkway began near Northern Boulevard in September 1961. Contracts for the upgrade were awarded in September 1962. The portion of the Hutchinson River Parkway south of Bruckner Boulevard and all of the Whitestone Parkway were converted to Interstate standards. The Whitestone Parkway was subsequently renamed the Whitestone Expressway, and the aforementioned segment of the Hutchinson River Parkway was renamed the Hutchinson River Expressway. The new four-lane bridges over the Flushing River opened in June 1963; it temporarily carried two lanes in each direction until the old drawbridge was upgraded. The Whitestone Expressway upgrade was completed on December 12, 1963.

The New York City Planning Commission approved the 3.7-mile (6.0 km) extension of the Van Wyck Expressway in April 1960. At the time, that project was planned to cost $3.48 million. Work on the Van Wyck Expressway Extension, as it was originally known, began in late 1961. The extension opened on December 30, 1963, although the Long Island Expressway and Jewel Avenue interchanges were not yet completed at the time. The opening of the Jewel Avenue interchange had been delayed by six weeks after a major steel contractor had filed for bankruptcy during the project.

=== Interstate Highway ===
As early as 1961, The New York Times had reported that the Whitestone Expressway was to be known as Interstate 678. City traffic commissioner Henry A. Barnes subsequently claimed that Moses had proposed the I-678 designation unilaterally. The Whitestone and Hutchinson River expressways were designated as I-678 c. 1965. The I-678 designation was extended southward over the Van Wyck Expressway to JFK Airport on January 1, 1970. Although it is designated as a three-digit auxiliary Interstate Highway, I-678 never intersects with its ostensible "parent" Interstate, I-78. Originally, I-78 would have continued eastward through New York City from its current terminus at the Holland Tunnel along the proposed Lower Manhattan Expressway and over the Williamsburg Bridge to Queens, where it would have followed the Bushwick Expressway past the southern end of the Van Wyck Expressway to Laurelton. From here, I-78 would have continued northward onto an extended Clearview Expressway and to the Bronx.

Early plans for I-678 had the highway following the Astoria Expressway, a proposed freeway that would run along the NY 25A corridor from I-278 to the Grand Central Parkway. These plans were mostly canceled by the late 1960s, leading to the truncation of I-78 to the Brooklyn–Queens Expressway (I-278) on January 1, 1970. In March 1971, Governor Nelson Rockefeller revealed a plan for improving New York City highways. The plan denied funding to several proposed New York City Interstate Highways, including the Astoria Expressway. Rockefeller said that these highways did not qualify for a funding agreement from the Federal-Aid Highway Act of 1952. The New York Times quoted a state official who said that this move had the effect of canceling these projects. I-78 currently ends at the east portal of the Holland Tunnel.

==== Late 20th century ====
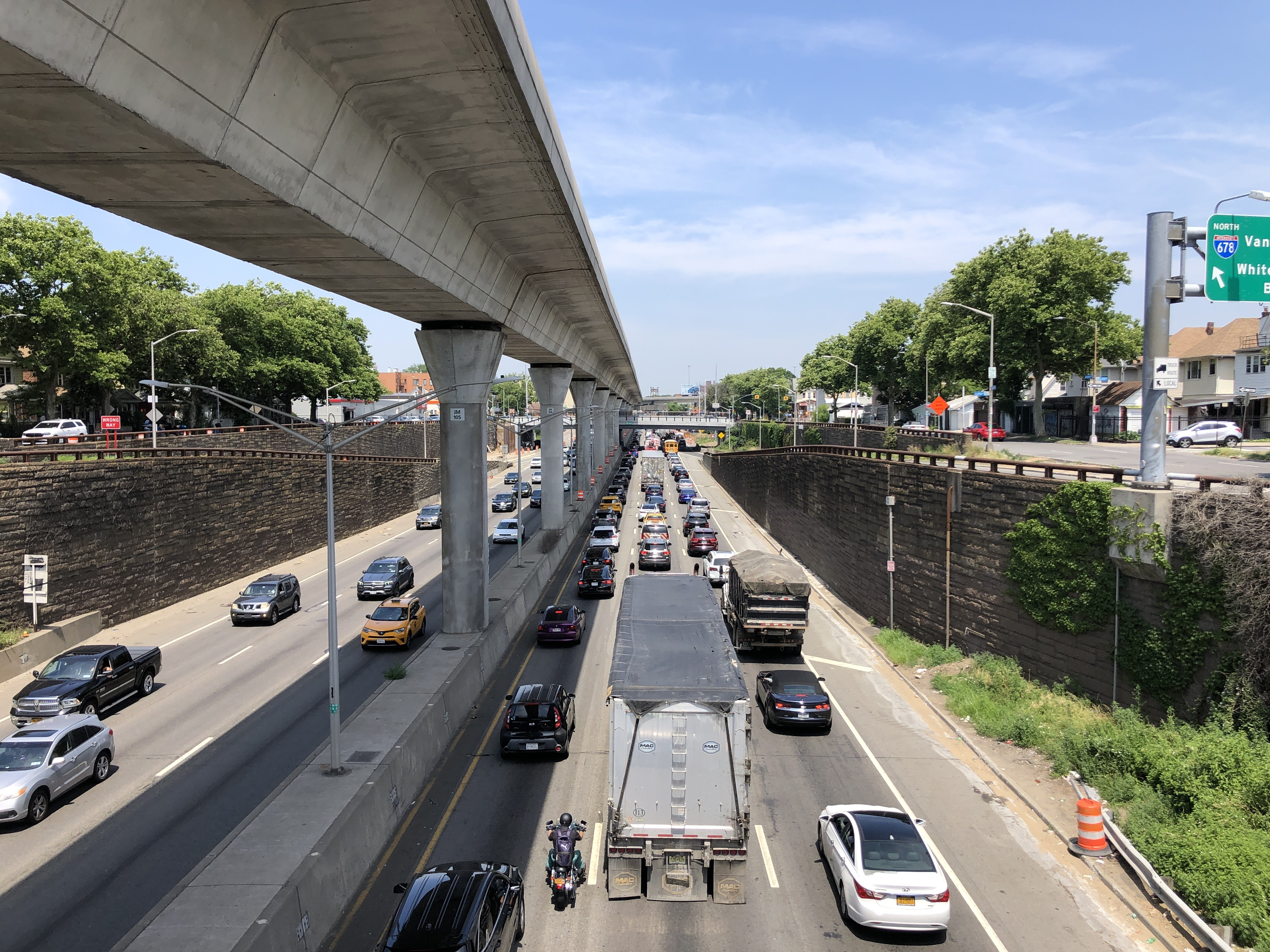
I-678 (Van Wyck Expressway) northbound at Liberty Avenue, with AirTrain JFK utilizing the median

In early 1988, both directions of the Whitestone Expressway near Northern Boulevard were temporarily closed because several girders in the southbound viaduct had corroded to the point that a structural failure was imminent. This part of the Whitestone Expressway, as well as the Van Wyck Expressway from Fowler Avenue south to the Long Island Expressway, were renovated in the mid-1990s. Starting in 2003, the northbound lanes of the Whitestone Expressway near Northern Boulevard were renovated. The project involved replacing a bascule bridge that had been at the location since the original parkway had opened in 1939, creating two U-turn ramps, and creating a new exit ramp from eastbound Northern Boulevard to Linden Place. Previously, traffic from Northern Boulevard had to cross over three lanes of northbound traffic from the Van Wyck Expressway.

The Jamaica Branch of the AirTrain JFK people mover system was built within the median of the Van Wyck from Atlantic Avenue to the Belt Parkway. Construction started in May 1998. The fact that the Jamaica Branch had to be built in the middle of the Van Wyck Expressway, combined with the varying length and curves of the track spans, caused complications during construction. One lane in each direction was closed during the off-peak hours, causing congestion on the Van Wyck. The AirTrain's guideways above the Van Wyck were completed in August 2001. The system opened in December 2003.

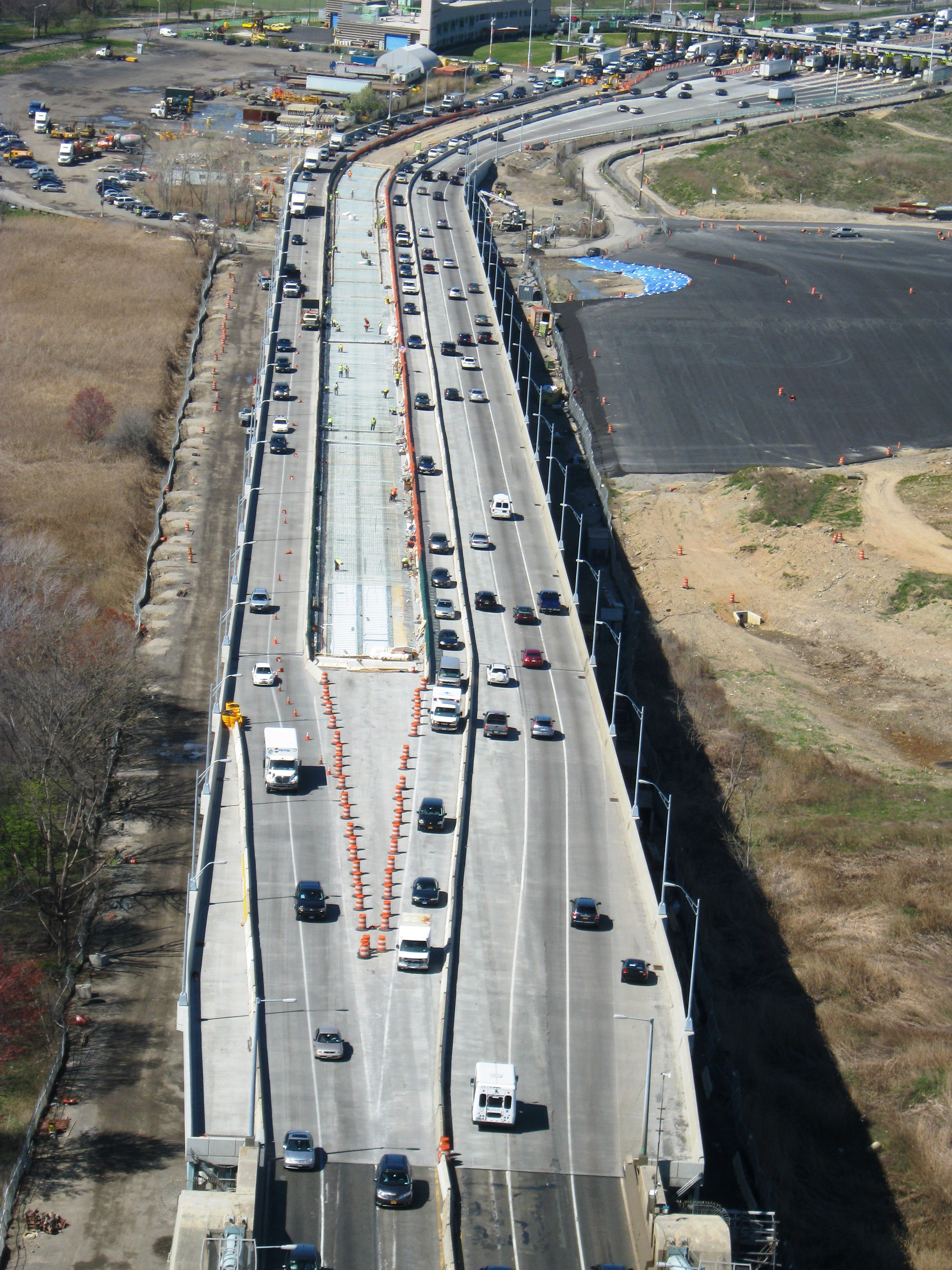
Bronx–Whitestone Bridge approach replacement

==== 21st century ====
A $286 million (equivalent to $496 million in 2025) renovation of the Bronx–Whitestone Bridge started in August 2001. The project replaced the bridge's span, among other things. The Queens and Bronx approaches were replaced in a project that started in 2008 and ended in 2015.

In early 2017, Governor Andrew Cuomo announced that as part of his plan to improve JFK Airport, two traffic bottlenecks along I-678 near the airport would be removed. At the Kew Gardens Interchange, the two-lane ramps between the Grand Central Parkway and the Van Wyck Expressway would be upgraded to three lanes in each direction. South of the interchange, the expressway will be expanded from three lanes to four lanes in each direction, with the new lanes being used as either high-occupancy vehicle lanes (HOV lanes) or bus lanes. These projects, combined, would cost $1.5 billion–2 billion (equivalent to $1.93 billion–2.58 billion in 2025). In October 2018, Cuomo released details of his $13 billion (equivalent to $16.4 billion in 2025) plan to rebuild passenger facilities and approaches to JFK Airport. The plan included widened ramps in Kew Gardens and a fourth vehicle lane on the Van Wyck Expressway south of Kew Gardens. In addition, northbound exit 5 at Atlantic Avenue and southbound exit 4 at Liberty Avenue would be permanently closed, as these junctions are near each other. Were the proposal approved, construction would begin in early 2020 and would be completed three years later. In 2021, workers began reconstructing five overpasses of I-678 in southern Queens. Work on an additional five overpasses began in mid-2022.

Also in 2017, NYSDOT began renovating an overpass that carried Jewel Avenue above I-678. The Jewel Avenue overpass was completed in 2019 and cost $13 million. In addition, the I-678 viaduct between I-495 and NY 25A was replaced in the early 2020s. The project, which consisted of the replacement of the viaduct's concrete deck, cost $124 million and was completed in February 2024. New high-occupancy vehicle lanes between the Kew Gardens Interchange and JFK Airport were completed in October 2026; this project required replacing several bridges and upgrading utility and electrical systems.

== Exit list ==
Borough	Location	mi	km	Exit	Destinations	Notes
Queens	JFK Airport	0.00	0.00	–	John F. Kennedy International Airport – All Terminals	Southern terminus
Queens	JFK Airport	0.30	0.48	A	U-Turn / Port Authority Police	
Queens	JFK Airport	1.10	1.77	B	Cell Phone Lot / General Aviation / Port Authority Administration	Southbound exit only
Queens	JFK Airport	1.40	2.25	C	Long Term Parking / Rental Cars / Cargo Areas	
Queens	South Ozone Park	1.70– 2.50	2.74– 4.02	1	NY 27 (South Conduit Avenue) / NY 878 east (Nassau Expressway) / Belt Parkway – Eastern Long Island, Brooklyn, Verrazzano Bridge	Signed as exits 1A (east) and 1B (west) northbound; exits 1 (NY 878), 1E (NY 27/Belt east) and 1W (west) southbound
Queens	South Ozone Park	2.66	4.28	2	Rockaway Boulevard	Former NY 27A
Queens	South Ozone Park	3.20	5.15	3	Linden Boulevard	
Queens	South Ozone Park	3.90	6.28	4	Liberty Avenue	No southbound exit
Queens	Richmond Hill	4.37	7.03	5	Atlantic Avenue	Exit permanently closed as of March 27, 2023.
Queens	Richmond Hill	4.76	7.66	6	Jamaica Avenue / Hillside Avenue	
Queens	Kew Gardens	5.00	8.05	7B (SB); 8 (NB)	Main Street / Union Turnpike	No southbound access to Union Turnpike east; Main Street not signed southbound
Queens	Kew Gardens	5.34	8.59	7C (SB); 9 (NB)	NY 25 west (Queens Boulevard)	No northbound entrance
Queens	Kew Gardens	5.87	9.45	10	Grand Central Parkway west – LaGuardia Airport, RFK Bridge	Northbound exit and southbound entrance; exit 13 on Grand Central Parkway
Queens	Kew Gardens	5.90	9.50	7A	Jackie Robinson Parkway west – Brooklyn	Southbound exit and northbound entrance; exit 7 on Jackie Robinson Parkway
Queens	Flushing Meadows–Corona Park	6.20– 6.90	9.98– 11.10	11	69th Road / Jewel Avenue – Flushing Meadows–Corona Park	
Queens	Flushing Meadows–Corona Park	7.20– 8.30	11.59– 13.36	12	I-495 (Long Island Expressway) / College Point Boulevard – Eastern Long Island, Manhattan, Midtown Tunnel	Signed as exits 12A (east) and 12B (west); exits 22C–D on I-495
Queens	Willets Point	8.90– 9.43	14.32– 15.18	13	NY 25A (Northern Boulevard) to Grand Central Parkway / Astoria Boulevard – Eastern Long Island, LaGuardia Airport, RFK Bridge, Citi Field, Marina	Signed as exits 13A (Astoria), 13B (GCP east), 13C (GCP west) and 13D (NY 25A) southbound; no southbound access to NY 25A east; access to GCP/Astoria via Whitestone Expy.; exit 9 on GCP
Queens	Willets Point	8.90– 9.43	14.32– 15.18	Transition between Van Wyck and Whitestone Expressways		
Queens	Flushing	9.90	15.93	14	Linden Place	
Queens	Flushing	10.80	17.38	15	20th Avenue	
Queens	Whitestone	11.30	18.19	16	Cross Island Parkway south – Eastern Long Island	Northern terminus and exits 36N-S on Cross Island Parkway
Queens	Whitestone	11.60	18.67	17	3rd Avenue / 14th Avenue	No entrance ramps; signed for 3rd Avenue northbound, 14th Avenue southbound; last northbound exit before toll
East River		11.90– 12.50	19.15– 20.12	Bronx–Whitestone Bridge (toll)		
The Bronx	Throggs Neck	13.60	21.89	18	Lafayette Avenue – Ferry Point Park	Last southbound exit before toll
The Bronx	Throggs Neck	13.90	22.37	19	I-95 / I-278 west – New Haven, CT, George Washington Bridge, RFK Bridge, Manhattan	Signed as exits 19N (north), 19S (south) and 19W (west); northbound exit and southbound entrance; exit 6A on I-95; exit 54 on I-278; all trucks must exit
The Bronx	Throggs Neck	14.33	23.06	–	Hutchinson River Parkway north – New Rochelle, White Plains, Yonkers	Continuation beyond Bruckner Interchange
1.000 mi = 1.609 km; 1.000 km = 0.621 mi: Electronic toll collection; Incomplete access; Route transition
