= Ferry Point Park =

Public park in the Bronx, New York

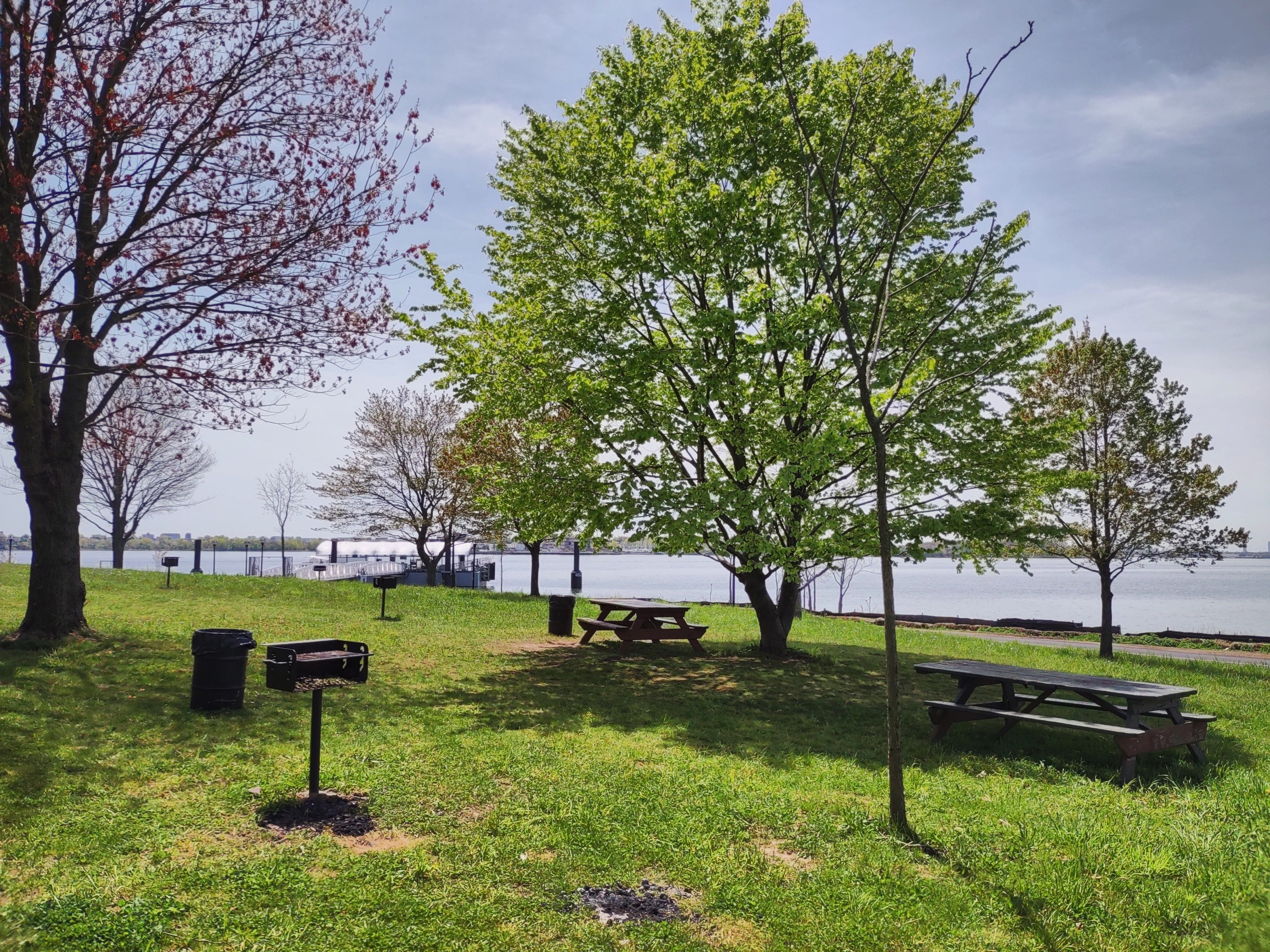
- Barbecue area of the park in 2022
- Interactive map of Ferry Point Park
- Type: Municipal park
- Location: Throggs Neck, The Bronx, New York
- Coordinates: 40.813°N 73.833°W
- Area: 413.8 acres (167.5 ha)
- Opened: 1940
- Owner: New York City Department of Parks and Recreation
- Status: open all year
- Water: East River
- Public transit: New York City Bus: Q44, Q50
- Facilities: golf course, community park, and waterfront promenade
- Website: www.nycgovparks.org/parks/ferry-point-park/

Ferry Point Park is a 413.8-acre (167.5 ha) park in the Bronx, New York City operated by the New York City Department of Parks and Recreation. The western part of the park along Westchester Creek opened in 1940, shortly after the completion of the adjacent Bronx–Whitestone Bridge. The eastern portion was originally a cove that was filled in with landfill by 1970, and became the park's golf course in 2015.

== Description ==
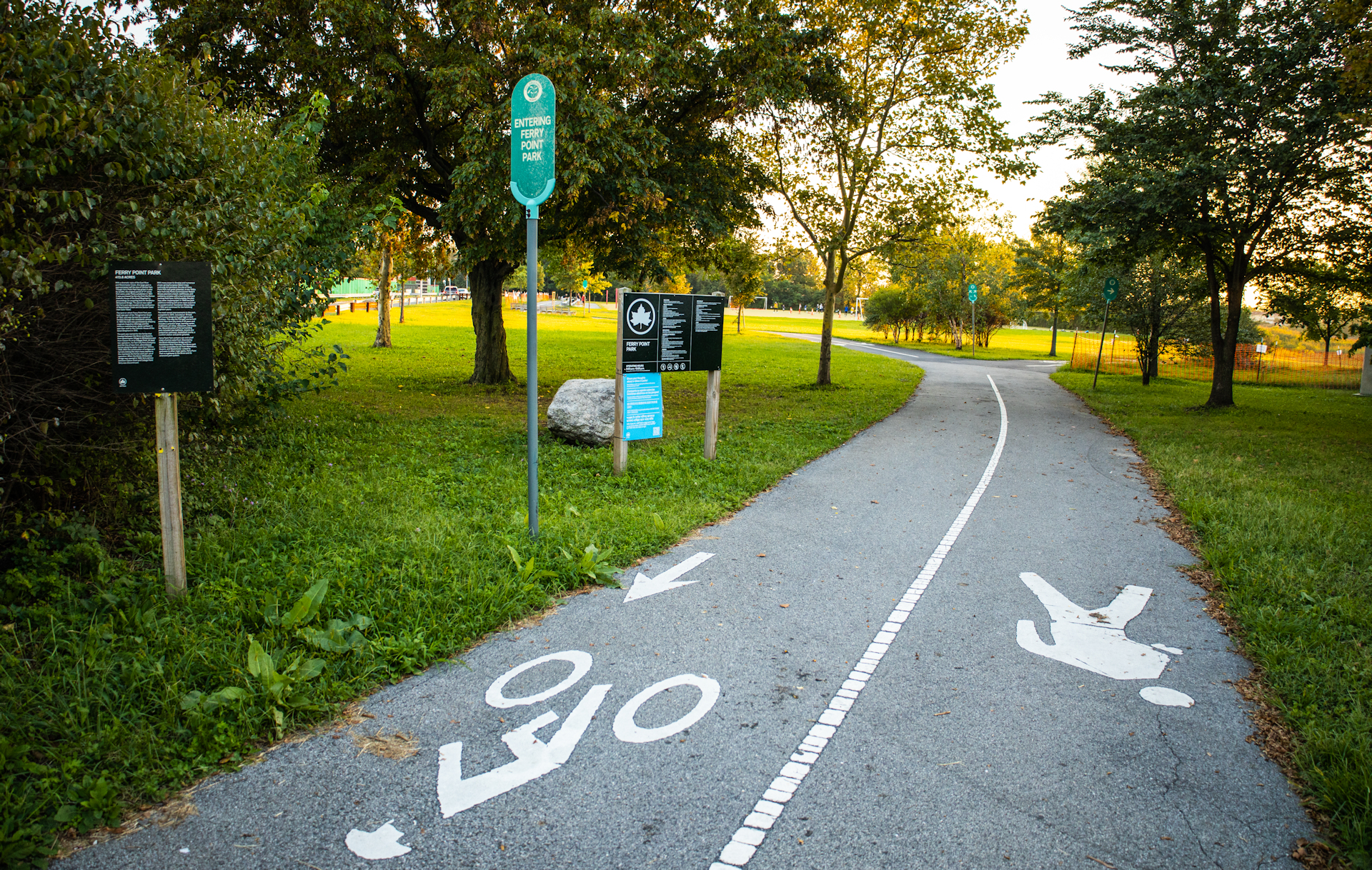
Shared-use path in the park in 2023

The park site is a peninsula projecting into the East River roughly opposite the College Point and Malba neighborhoods of Queens. The park is located on the eastern shore of Westchester Creek, adjacent to the neighborhood of Throggs Neck. The Hutchinson River Expressway (Interstate 678) crosses the park to the Bronx–Whitestone Bridge, splitting it into east and west sides.

The west side has barbecue areas, 8 soccer fields, 2 cricket fields, 9/11 Living Memorial Forest and Hilltop Grove. The west side is also heavily used for fishing and barbecues. Friends of Ferry Point Park holds cleanup events, plantings and helps care for the 3,000 trees planted in the park as the Ferry Point 9/11 Memorial Grove and 9/11 Living Memorial Forest. These trees were donated by the Prince of Monaco.

The east side of the park has a golf course called Bally's Golf Links, a community park, and a waterfront promenade. The east side borders are Saint Raymond's Cemetery; Balcom Avenue, Miles Avenue and Emerson Avenue; and the East River and the Bronx-Whitestone Bridge. The east side of Ferry Point Park is equipped with sports fields, basketball and handball courts.

By 2023 there were new plantings, drainage, new electric, and a ferry dock with a small bus that brings commuters from the reconstructed parking Lot. The park includes a baseball field, basketball court, playground, trails and comfort station. The waterfront promenade has a main shared trail. A 40-foot (12 m) hill and some shorter ones block the golf course from view. There has been ecological revitalization of the waterfront on the east side near the East River Crescent area.

The New York City Bus-operated Q44 and the MTA Bus-operated Q50 bus lines stop near Ferry Point Park. Additionally, the park is accessible from the Bronx–Whitestone Bridge. On December 28, 2021 the Soundview Ferry line of NYC Ferry began service to Ferry Point.

== History ==
=== Background ===
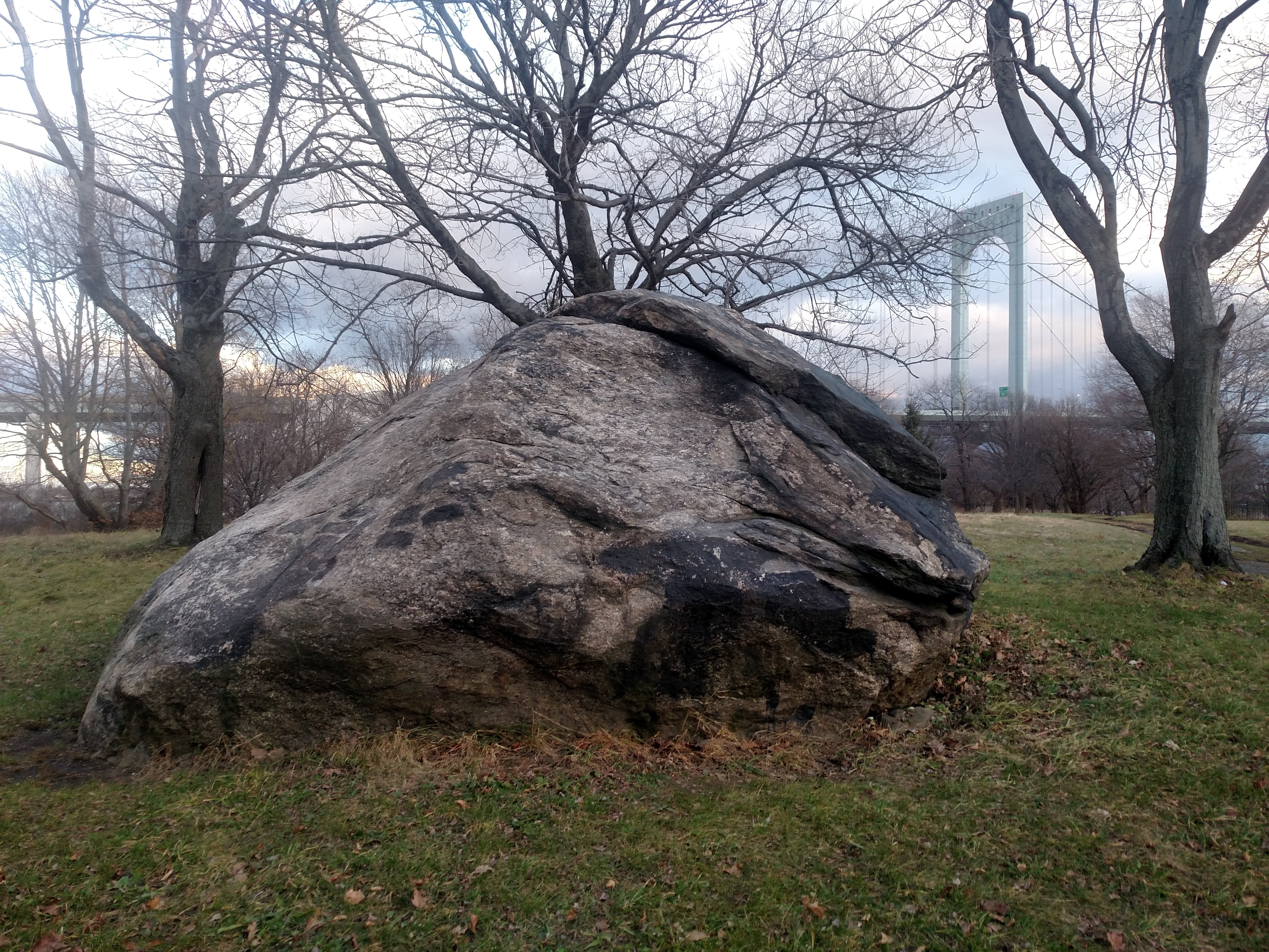
A large boulder, possibly a glacial erratic, sits in the west side of the park near the base of the Bronx-Whitestone Bridge.

Ferry Point is named after the Ferris family, who were 18th-century residents of Throggs Neck. By the 19th century, the area had developed into a fashionable public summer resort, which also contained large German beer gardens, to which the residents of Yorkville, Manhattan (then a heavily German neighborhood) arrived by steamboat service up the East River. The 19th-century steamboat landing at Ferris Dock on Westchester Creek stood at present-day Brush Avenue north of Wenner Place; the road to it bore the name of the steamboat Osseo.

The first house to be built in the Bronx was reportedly the Charlton Ferris House, built in 1687 along Ferris Avenue between Wenner Place, Brush Avenue and Lafayette Avenue. It was situated on the estate of Albert L. Lovenstein. Several other large and handsome 18th-century Ferris houses were built in the neighborhood, of which two lasted until the 1960s.

Commac Street was nearby and parallel to Osseo and later demapped as well. The city sold this 6 acres to be developed and it had become a truck parking facility as of 2012. Wenner Place terminated at Westchester Creek and for many generations was used as a boat launch. New York City cut off the access to this Creek as it sold off the waterfront to developers. Neighbors are advocating for a boat launch at the nearby east side of this park and a kayak launch on the west side.

=== Early history ===
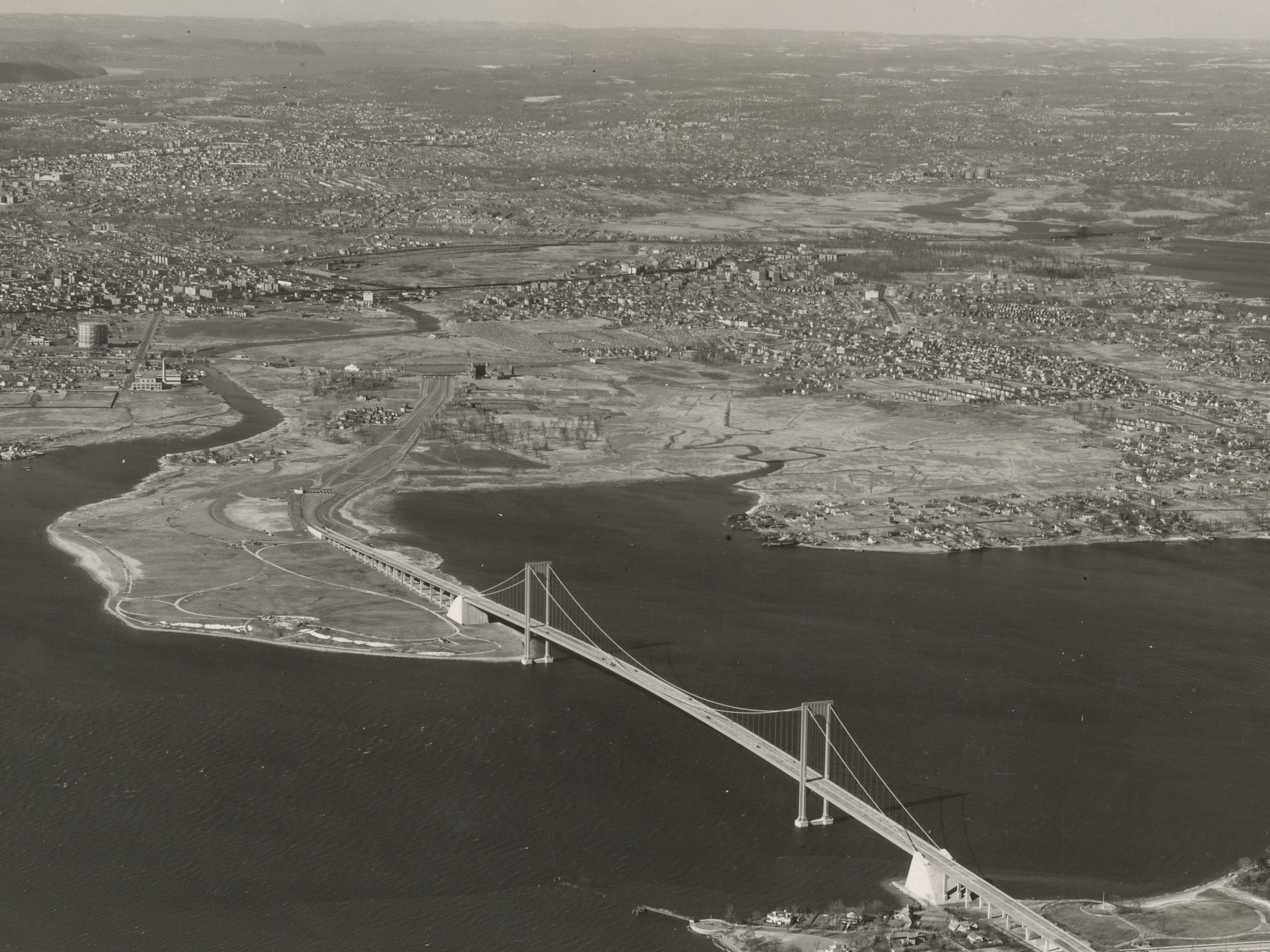
Ferry Point Park in 1940. The cove would be filled in with landfill by 1970, and would become the park's golf course in 2015. The land just above the cove would become New Saint Raymond's Cemetery in 1951.

In 1937, New York City acquired the land for Ferry Point Park in preparation for the construction of the Bronx-Whitestone Bridge. The land had belonged to the Roman Catholic House of the Good Shepherd. The original 171-acre (69 ha) parcel was called 'Old Ferry' and was located at the confluence of the Westchester Creek and the Baxter Creek Inlet. Baxter Creek later became the East side of the park when it was filled in by landfill. In the 1930s, New York City Parks Commissioner Robert Moses planned a beach, bathhouse, cafeteria complex, bus terminal and parking field for the site, but none were ever built. The landscaped west-side parkland was opened to the public in 1940.

In 1948, 243 acres (98 ha) were added to the park by condemnation, bringing it to its current land area. The west side of the park was well utilized by churches, schools, and visitors from Parkchester, Castle Hill and Throggs Neck apartments. The east side underwent years of raw garbage Landfill under the authority of the Department of Sanitation (began in 1952 and continued until 1970).

=== Golf course ===
Early 2000s plans for revitalizing Ferry Point Park included an 18-hole golf course and an adjacent community park and waterfront promenade were developed by the New York City Department of Parks and Recreation. The adjacent parks were design by Thomas Balsley Associates and the golf course was designed by Jack Nicklaus in collaboration with John Sanford. Laws Construction built the community park, which opened in 2012, and the golf course, which opened in 2015. The Trump Organization received the city's concessionaire contract to grow-in and maintain the golf course and run the general golf operations.

In early 2021, New York City mayor Bill de Blasio announced that the city government would be severing all contracts with the Trump Organization, including Ferry Point's golf course, citing Trump's involvement in the previous week's storming of the United States Capitol. The operating lease was assumed by Bally's Corporation.

=== Casino proposal ===
Bally's New York
- Interactive map of Bally's New York
- Location: Throggs Neck, Bronx, New York, United States
- No. of rooms: 527
- Gaming space: 200,000 sq ft
- Casino type: Resort
- Operating license holder: Bally's Corporation

Bally's is one of multiple companies bidding for a casino license to operate a casino in downstate New York. Bally's is looking to build a resort that features a 500 room hotel, convention space and a 2,000 seat events center. Renderings for the casino were released in March 2025. The Trump Organization stood to gain $115 million if the casino were approved.

In June 2025, the New York City Council voted 32–12 in favor of "alienating" 16 acres (6.5 ha) for the proposed casino resort after Mayor Eric Adams stepped in to remove the home rule provision. On June 27, 2025, Bally's submitted their bid for a commercial casino license costing $4 billion. The City Council voted in July 2025 against rezoning the land, which would have allowed the casino to be built. Later that month, Mayor Adams vetoed the vote. The city council opted to not vote to override the veto, allowing the project to proceed.

On September 29, 2025, the Community Advisory Committee voted in favor of advancing Bally's bid for consideration for a full casino license. On December 1, 2025, the state's Gaming Facility Location Board recommended that a casino license be awarded to Bally's, an action which needed to be ratified by the New York State Gaming Commission by the end of the year before formal approval could be issued. Final approval of the casino license was given by the Gaming Commission on December 15, 2025, at which point the casino was scheduled to open in 2030. Bally's acquired some parkland for the casino in early 2026.
