= Lists of crossings of the East River =

For crossings of the East River, a tidal strait in New York City, United States, see:

- List of fixed crossings of the East River (bridges and tunnels)
- List of ferries across the East River
