= The Bronx =

Borough and county in New York, US

The Bronx Bronx County, New York
- Borough and county
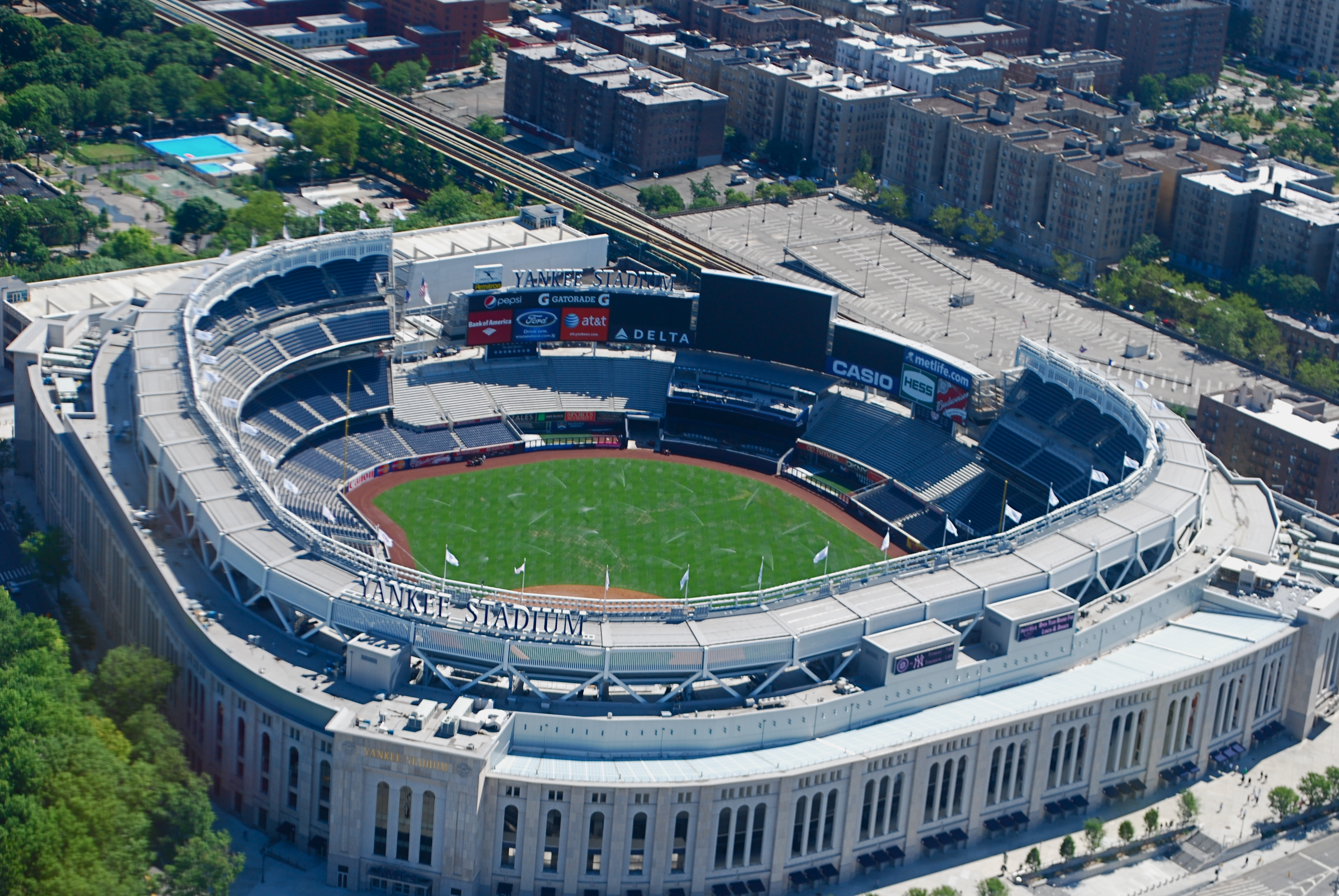
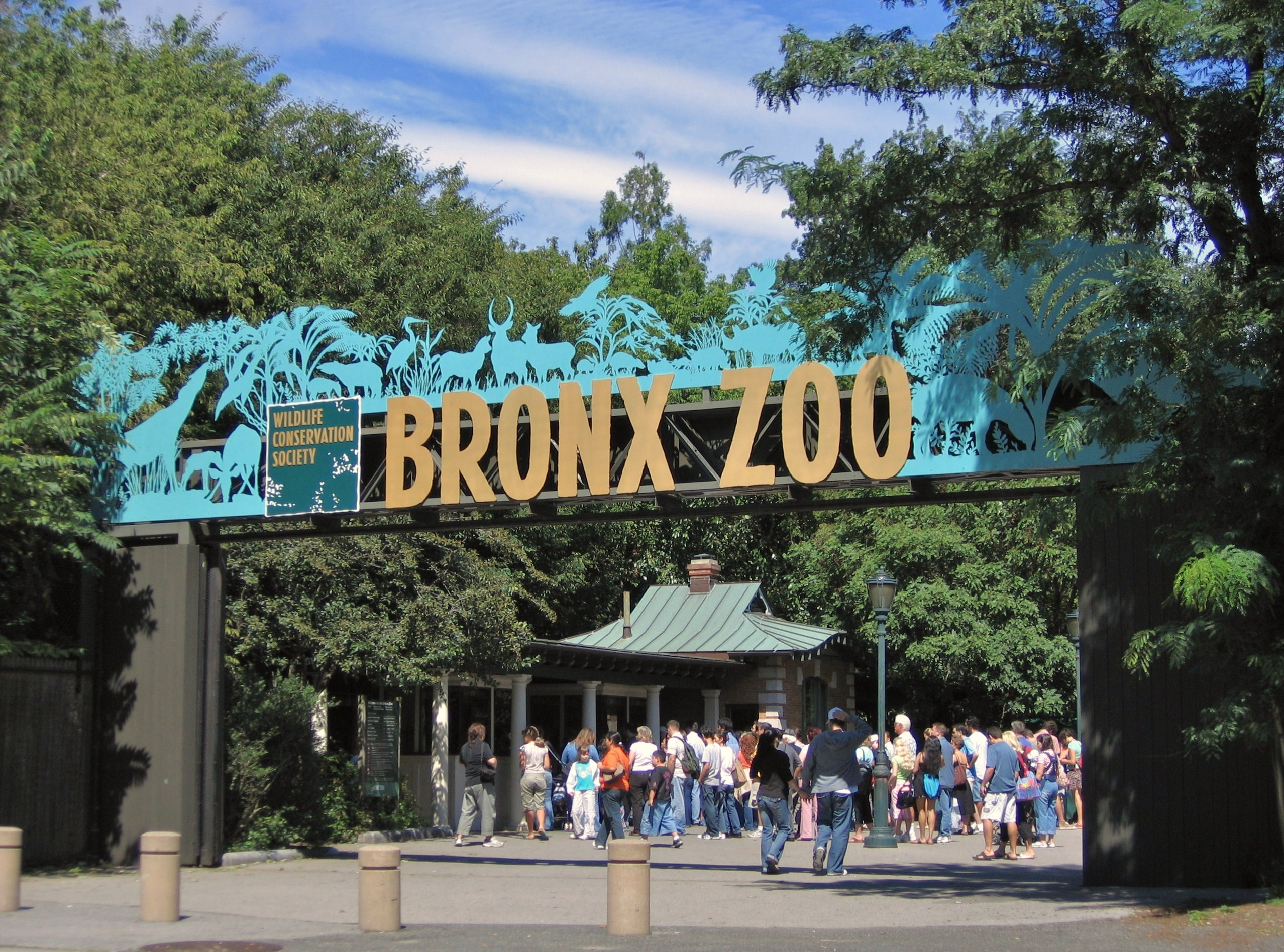
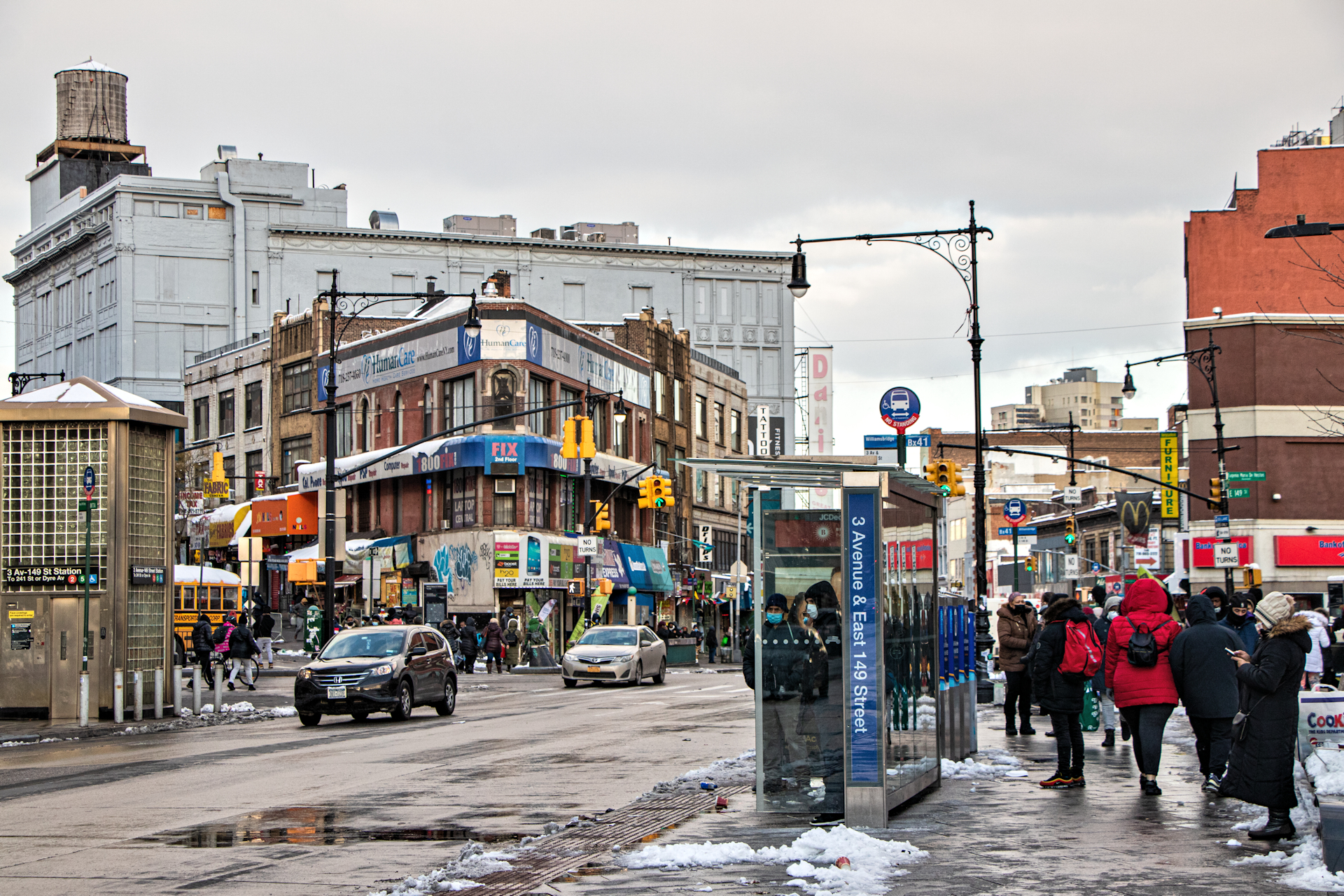
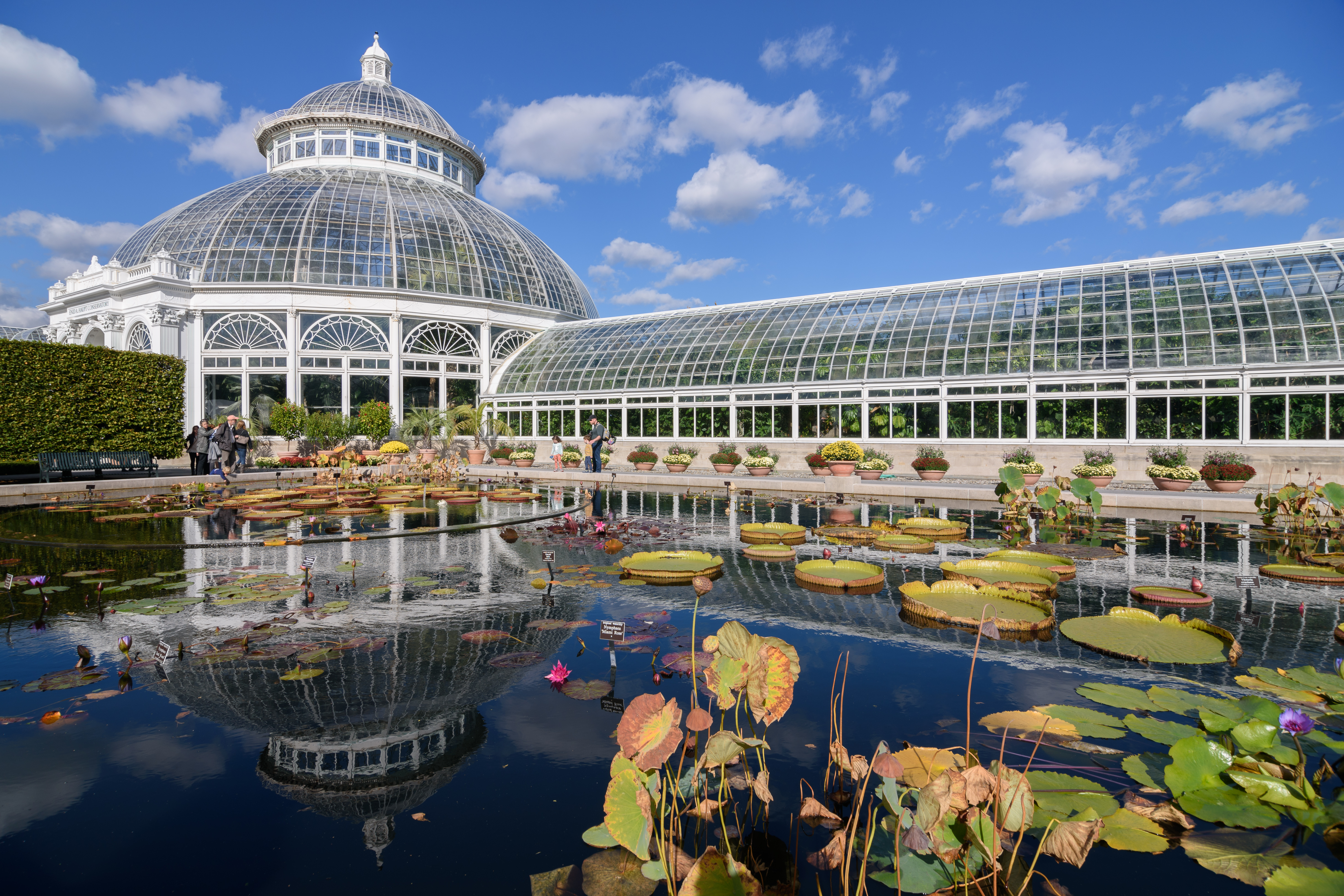
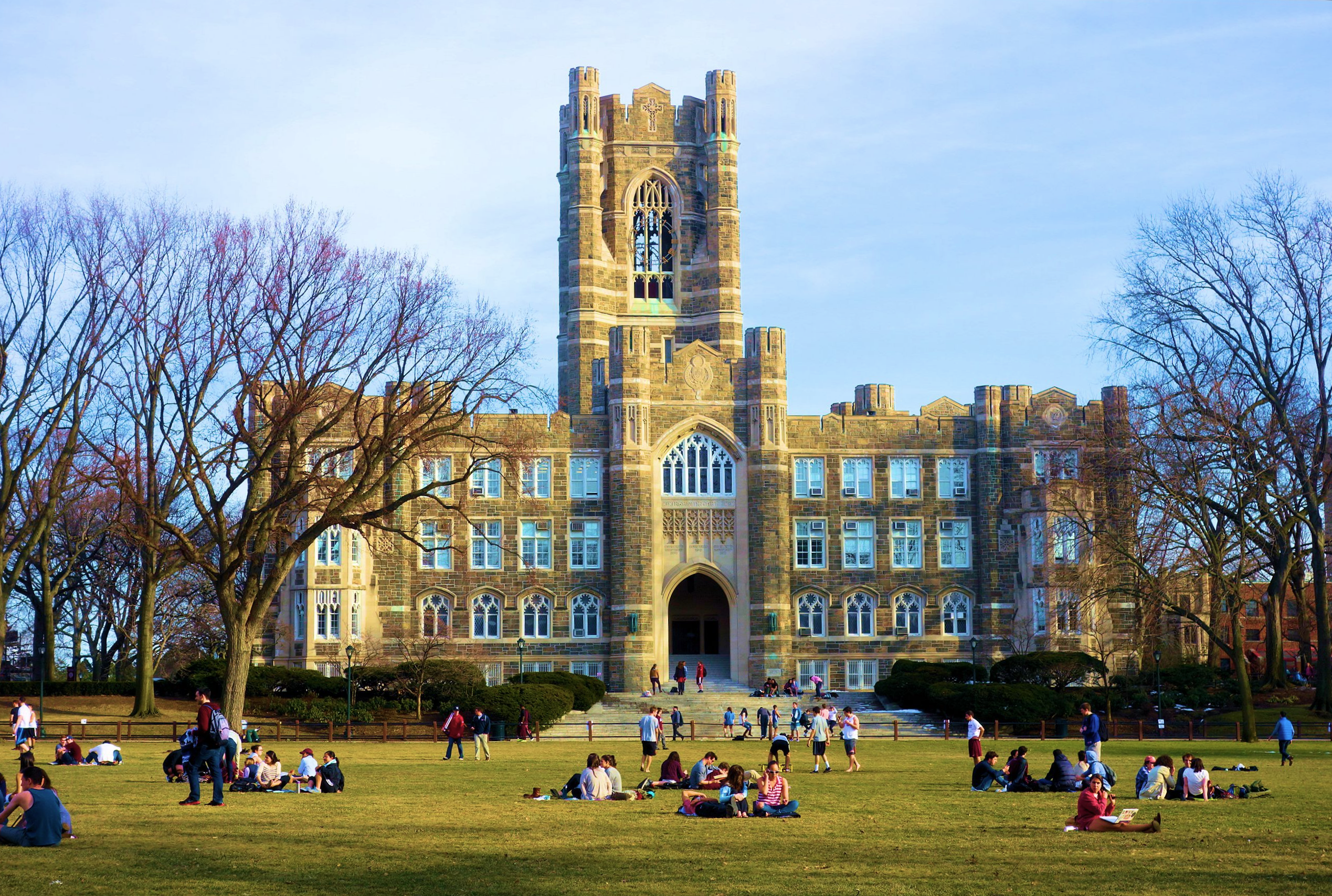
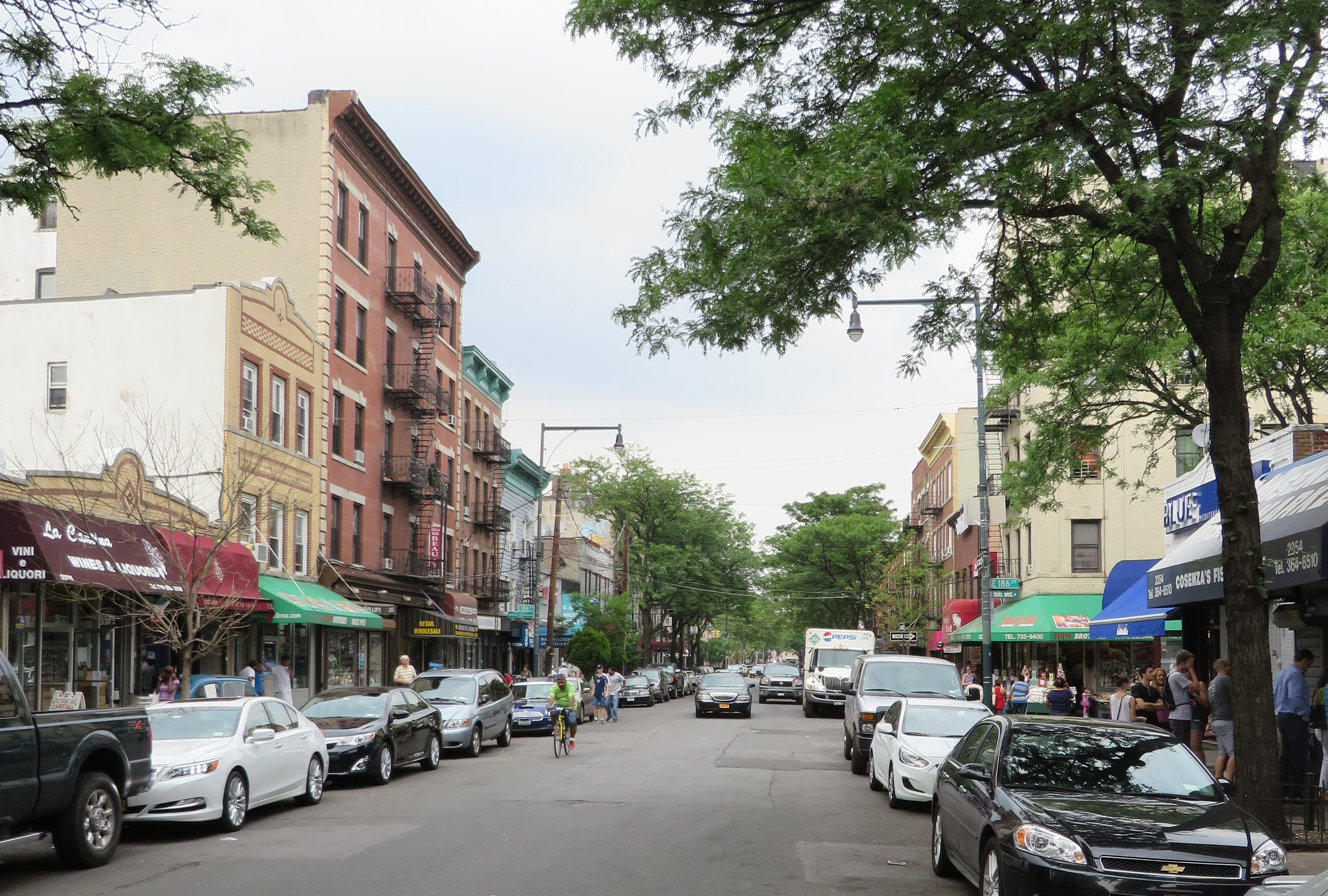
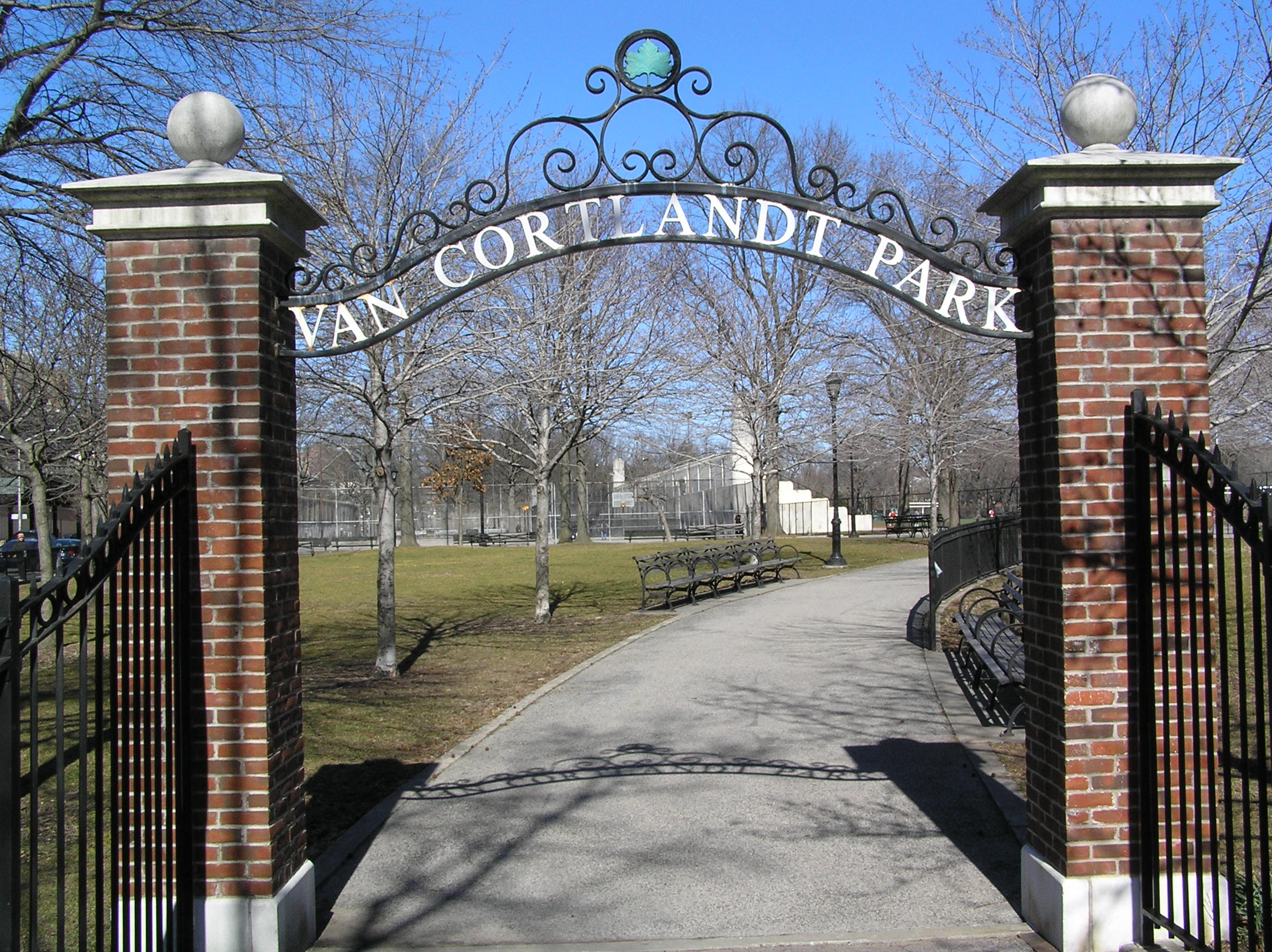
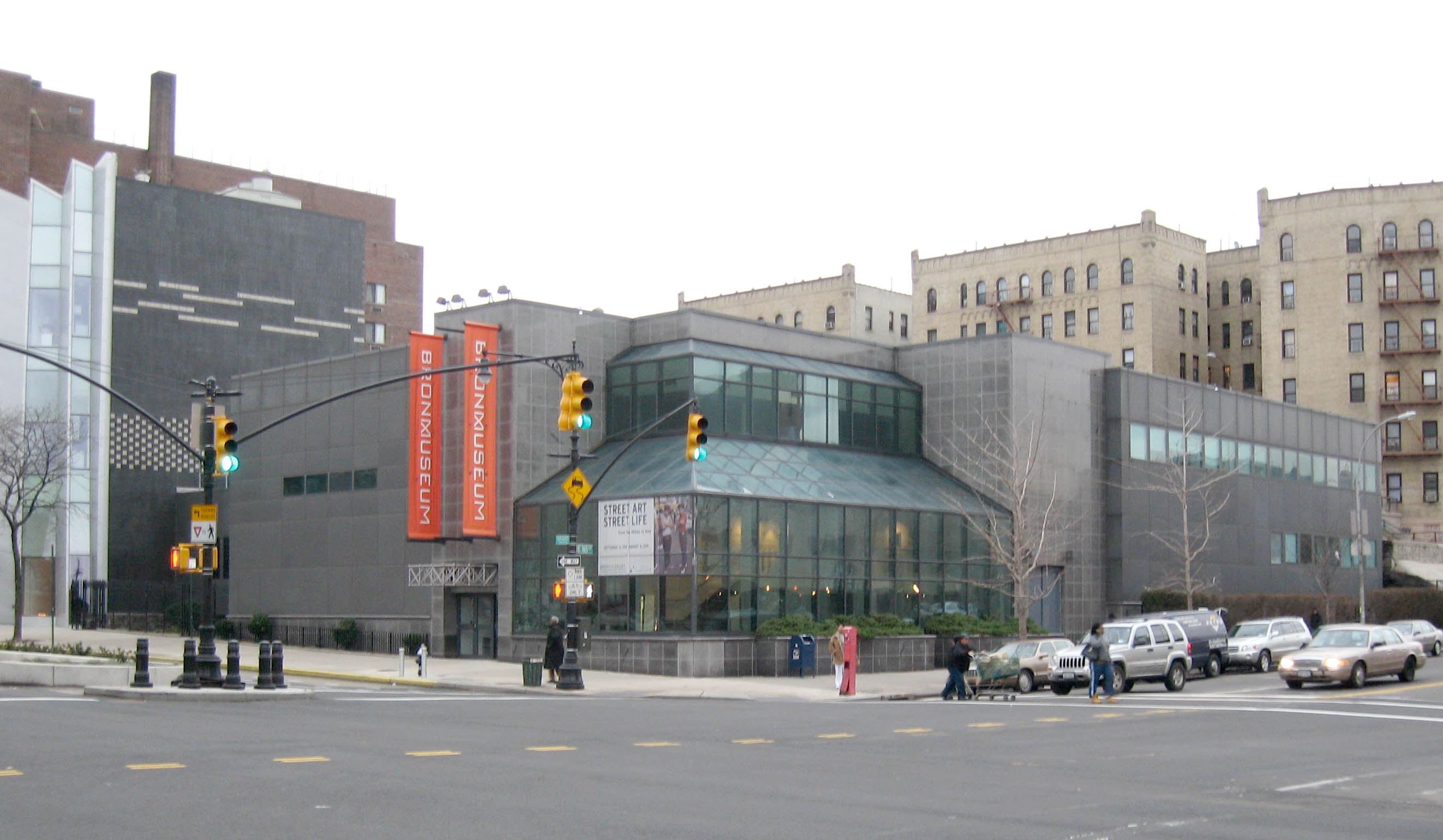
- Yankee Stadium Bronx Zoo The Hub New York Botanical Garden Fordham University Arthur Avenue Van Cortlandt Park Bronx Museum of the Arts

- Flag Seal
- Motto: Ne cede malis – "Yield Not to Evil" (lit. 'Yield Not to Evil Things')
- Interactive map outlining the Bronx
- Coordinates: 40°50′14″N 73°53′10″W
- Country: United States
- State: New York
- County: Bronx (coterminous)
- City: New York City
- Settled: 1639; 387 years ago
- Named for: Bronx River (derived from Jonas Bronck)

Government
  - Type: Borough of New York City
  - Borough President: Vanessa Gibson (D) – (Borough of the Bronx)
  - District Attorney: Darcel Clark (D) – (Bronx County)

Area
  - Total: 57 sq mi (150 km^{2})
  - Land: 42.2 sq mi (109 km^{2})
  - Water: 15 sq mi (39 km^{2}) 27%
- Highest elevation: 280 ft (85 m)

Population (2020)
  - Total: 1,472,654
  - Estimate (2025): 1,406,332 ▼
  - Density: 34,918/sq mi (13,482/km^{2})
  - Demonym: Bronxite

GDP
  - Total: US$58.323 billion (2024)
  - Per capita: US$41,479 (2024)
- Time zone: UTC−05:00 (Eastern)
  - Summer (DST): UTC−04:00 (EDT)
- ZIP Code prefix: 104
- Area codes: 718/347/929/465, 917
- Website: bronxboropres.nyc.gov

The Bronx (/brɒŋks/ BRONKS) is the northernmost of the five boroughs of New York City. The Bronx has a land area of 42 square miles (109 km^{2}) and a population of 1,472,654 at the 2020 census. It has the fourth largest area, fourth largest population, and third highest population density of the boroughs. The Bronx is the only borough located primarily on the U.S. mainland, bordering Westchester County to its north; the Hudson River and the borough of Manhattan, across the Harlem River, to its west; the borough of Queens, across the East River, to its south; and Long Island Sound to its east. The borough is coextensive with Bronx County, one of the 62 counties of New York State.

The Bronx is divided by the Bronx River into a hillier section in the west and a flatter eastern section. East and west street names are divided by Jerome Avenue. The west was annexed to New York City in 1874, and the areas east of the Bronx River in 1895. Bronx County was separated from New York County (which had included the boroughs of Manhattan and the Bronx) in 1914. About a quarter of the Bronx's area is open space, including Woodlawn Cemetery, Van Cortlandt Park, Pelham Bay Park, the New York Botanical Garden, and the Bronx Zoo in the borough's north and center. The Thain Family Forest at the New York Botanical Garden is thousands of years old and is New York City's largest remaining tract of the original forest that once covered the city. These open spaces are primarily on land reserved in the late 19th century as urban development progressed north and east from Manhattan. The Bronx is also home to Yankee Stadium of Major League Baseball.

The word Bronx originated with Jonas Bronck, who established the first European settlement in the area as part of the New Netherland colony in 1639. European settlers displaced the native Lenape after 1643. In the 19th and 20th centuries, the Bronx received many immigrant and migrant groups as it was transformed into an urban community, first from European countries (especially Ireland, Germany, Italy, and Eastern Europe) and later from the Caribbean region (particularly Puerto Rico, Trinidad, Haiti, Guyana, Jamaica, Barbados, and the Dominican Republic) and West Africa (mainly Ghana and Nigeria). African American migrants from the Southern United States as well as Panamanians, Hondurans, and South Asians also established themselves in the borough in large numbers.

The Bronx contains what had been the poorest of all 435 U.S. congressional districts, New York's 15th, until redistricting following the 2020 census. The borough also features upper- and middle-income neighborhoods, such as Riverdale, Fieldston, Spuyten Duyvil, Schuylerville, Pelham Bay, Pelham Gardens, Morris Park, and Country Club. Parts of the Bronx saw a steep decline in population, livable housing, and quality of life starting from the mid-to-late 1960s and lasting well into the 1980s, including a wave of arson in the late 1970s. The South Bronx, in particular, experienced severe urban decay from the 1960s to the 1990s. The borough began experiencing new population growth starting in the late 1990s and continuing to the present day. And in recent years the Borough has even achieving its lowest number of murders in the Borough’s history recently.

== Etymology and naming ==
=== Early names ===
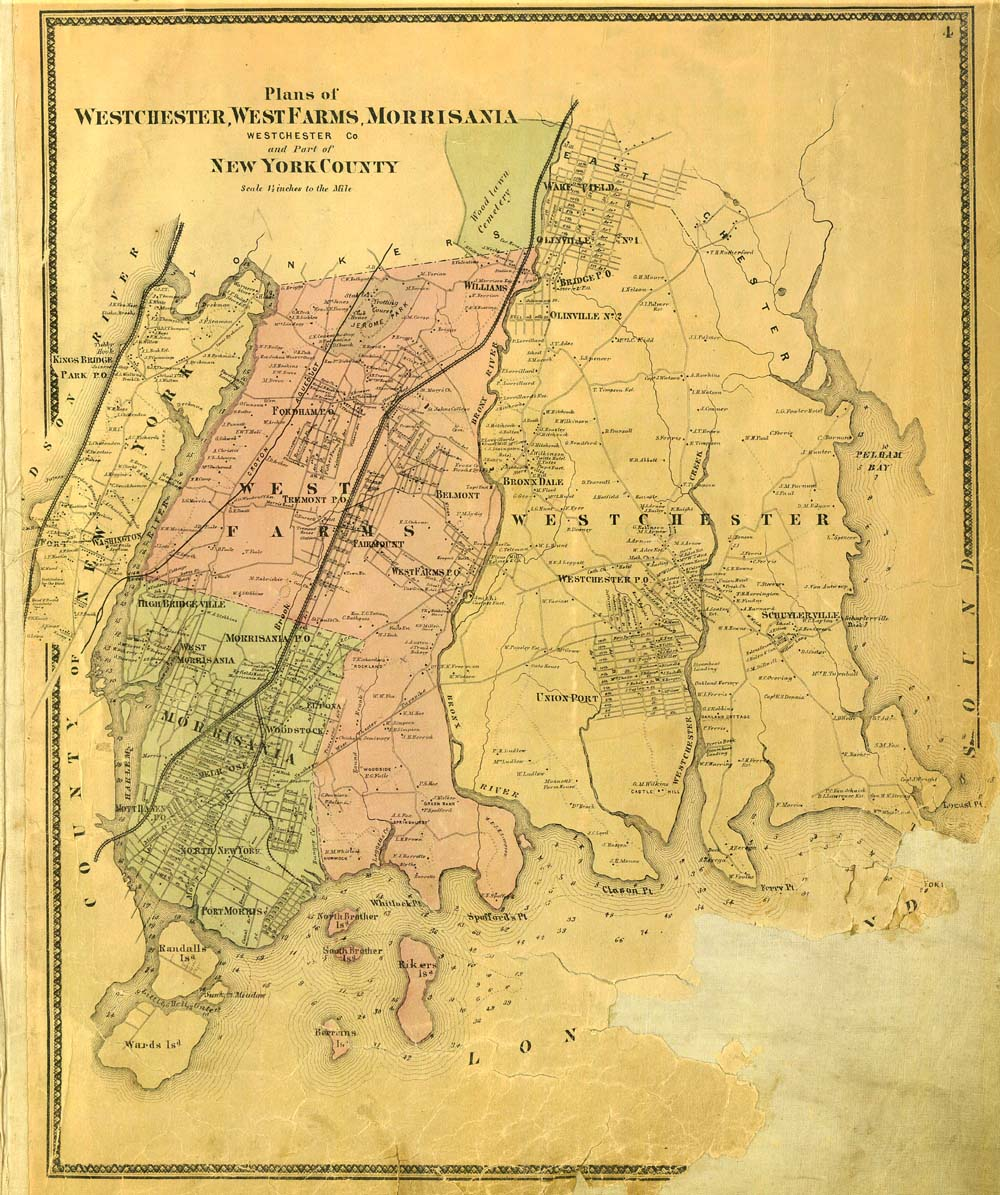
A map of southern Westchester County in 1867. This, along with the southern part of the former Town of Yonkers, became the Bronx.

The Bronx was called Rananchqua by the native Siwanoy band of Lenape, also known historically as the Delawares. Other Native Americans knew the Bronx as Keskeskeck. It was divided by the Aquahung River (now known in English as the Bronx River).

The "Bronx" name derives from Jonas Bronck (c. 1600–1643), a European settler whose precise origins are disputed. Documents indicate he was a Swedish-born immigrant from Komstad, Norra Ljunga parish in Småland, Sweden, who arrived in New Netherland during the spring of 1639. Bronck became the first recorded European settler in the present-day Bronx and built a farm named "Emmaus" close to what today is the corner of Willis Avenue and 132nd Street in Mott Haven.

He leased land from the Dutch West India Company on the neck of the mainland immediately north of the Dutch settlement of New Haarlem (on Manhattan Island), and bought additional tracts from the local tribes. He eventually accumulated 500 acres (200 ha) between the Harlem River and the Aquahung, which became known as Bronck's River or the Bronx River. Dutch and English settlers referred to the area as Bronck's Land.

The American poet William Bronk was a descendant of Pieter Bronck, probably Jonas Bronck's nephew or cousin, as there was an age difference of 16 years. Much work on the Swedish claim has been undertaken by Brian G. Andersson, former Commissioner of New York City's Department of Records, who helped organize a 375th Anniversary celebration in Bronck's hometown in 2014.

=== Use of definite article ===
The Bronx is referred to with the definite article as "the Bronx" or "The Bronx", both legally and colloquially. The "County of the Bronx" also takes "the" immediately before "Bronx" in formal references, like the coextensive "Borough of the Bronx". The United States Postal Service uses "Bronx, NY" for mailing addresses. The definite article comes from the Bronx River and first appeared in the "Annexed District of The Bronx", created in 1874 out of part of Westchester County.

It was continued in the "Borough of The Bronx", created in 1898, which included a larger annexation from Westchester County in 1895. The use of the definite article is attributed to the style of referring to rivers. A time-worn story purportedly explaining the use of the definite article in the borough's name says it stems from the phrase "visiting the Broncks", referring to the settler's family.

The capitalization of the borough's name is sometimes disputed. Generally, the definite article is lowercase in place names ("the Bronx") except in some official references. The definite article is capitalized ("The Bronx") at the beginning of a sentence or in any other situation when a normally lowercase word would be capitalized. Some people and groups refer to the borough with a capital letter at all times, such as Bronx Borough Historian Lloyd Ultan, The Bronx County Historical Society, and the Bronx-based organization Great and Glorious Grand Army of The Bronx, arguing the definite article is part of the proper name. In particular, the Great and Glorious Grand Army of The Bronx is leading efforts to make the city refer to the borough with an uppercase definite article in all uses, comparing the lowercase article in the Bronx's name to "not capitalizing the 's' in 'Staten Island'".

== History ==
The first published book of Bronx history: History of Bronx Borough, City of New York by Randall Comfort

Originally, the area was part of the Lenape's Lenapehoking territory inhabited by Siwanoy of the Wappinger Confederacy. European colonization of the Bronx began in 1639. Over time, European colonists converted the area into farmlands. The Bronx was originally part of Westchester County, but it was ceded to New York City in two major parts (the West Bronx in 1874 and the East Bronx in 1895), subsequently becoming Bronx County.

=== Before 1914 ===
The Bronx's development is directly connected to its strategic location between New England and New York (Manhattan). Control over the bridges across the Harlem River plagued the period of British colonial rule. The King's Bridge, built in 1693 where Broadway reached the Spuyten Duyvil Creek, was a possession of Frederick Philipse, lord of Philipse Manor. Local farmers on both sides of the creek resented the tolls, and in 1759, Jacobus Dyckman and Benjamin Palmer led them in building a free bridge across the Harlem River. After the American Revolutionary War, the King's Bridge toll was abolished.

The territory now contained within Bronx County was originally part of Westchester County, one of the 12 original counties of the English Province of New York. The present Bronx County was contained in the town of Westchester and parts of the towns of Yonkers, Eastchester, and Pelham. In 1846, a new town was created by division of Westchester, called West Farms. The town of Morrisania was created, in turn, from West Farms in 1855. In 1873, the town of Kingsbridge was established within the former borders of the town of Yonkers, roughly corresponding to the modern Bronx neighborhoods of Kingsbridge, Riverdale, and Woodlawn Heights, and included Woodlawn Cemetery.

Among the famous people who settled in the Bronx during the 19th and early 20th centuries were author Willa Cather, tobacco merchant Pierre Lorillard, and inventor Jordan L. Mott, who established Mott Haven to house the workers at his iron works.

The consolidation of the Bronx into New York City proceeded in two stages. In 1873, the state legislature annexed Kingsbridge, West Farms, and Morrisania to New York, effective in 1874; the three towns were soon abolished in the process.

In 1895, the whole territory east of the Bronx River was annexed to the city three years before New York's consolidation with Brooklyn, Queens, and Staten Island. This included the Town of Westchester, which had voted against consolidation in 1894, and parts of Eastchester and Pelham. The maritime community of City Island voted to join the city in 1896.

Following these two annexations, the Bronx's territory had moved from Westchester County into New York County, which already included Manhattan and the rest of pre-1874 New York City.

On January 1, 1898, the consolidated City of New York was born, including the Bronx as one of the five distinct boroughs. It remained part of New York County until Bronx County was created in 1914.

On April 19, 1912, those parts of New York County which had been annexed from Westchester County in previous decades were newly constituted as Bronx County, the 62nd and last county to be created by the state, effective in 1914. Bronx County's courts opened for business on January 2, 1914, the same day that John P. Mitchel started work as Mayor of New York City. Marble Hill, Manhattan, was now connected to the Bronx by filling in the former waterway, but it is not part of the borough or Bronx County.

=== After 1914 ===
The history of the Bronx during the 20th century may be divided into four periods: a boom period during 1900–1929, with a population growth by a factor of six from 200,000 in 1900 to 1.3 million in 1930. The Great Depression and post-World War II years saw a slowing of growth leading into an eventual decline. The mid to late century were hard times, as the Bronx changed during 1950–1985 from a predominantly moderate-income to a predominantly lower-income area with high rates of violent crime and poverty in some areas. The Bronx has experienced an economic and developmental resurgence starting in the late 1980s that continues into today.

==== New York City expands ====
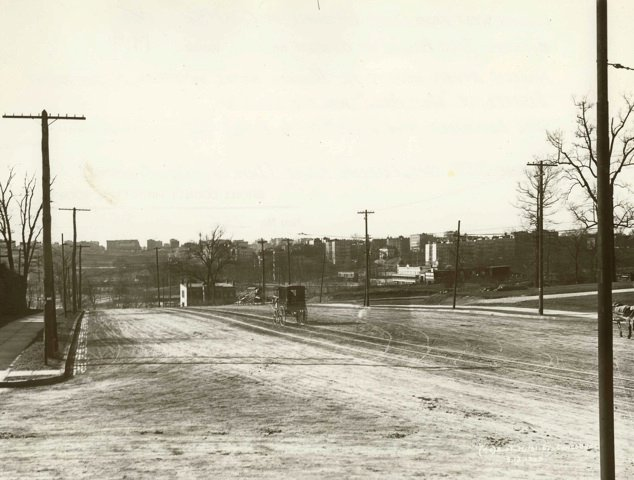
The Grand Concourse and 161st Street as they appeared around 1900

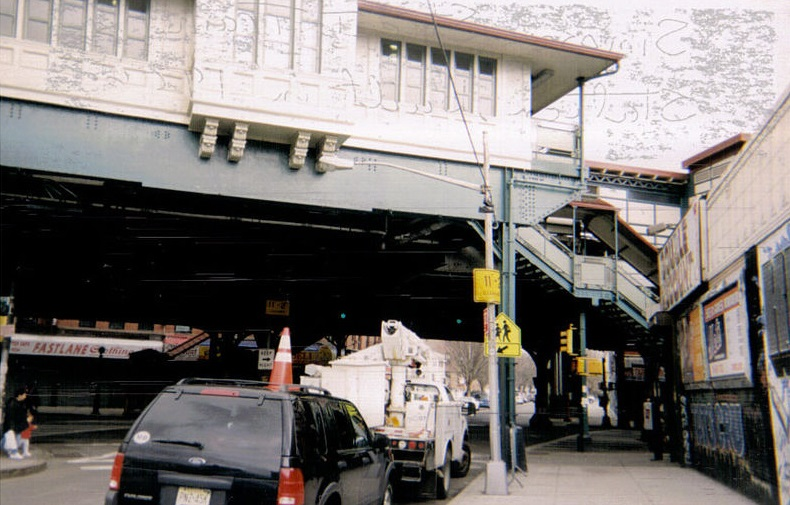
The Simpson Street elevated station was built in 1904. It was listed in the National Register of Historic Places in 2004.

The Bronx was a mostly rural area for many generations, with small farms supplying the city markets. In the late 19th century, it grew into a railroad suburb. Faster transportation enabled rapid population growth in the late 19th century, involving the move from horse-drawn street cars to elevated railways and the subway system, which linked to Manhattan in 1904.

The South Bronx was a manufacturing center for many years, and was noted as a center of piano manufacturing in the early part of the 20th century. In 1919, the Bronx was the site of 63 piano factories employing more than 5,000 workers.

Before the end of World War I, the Bronx hosted the rather small 1918 World's Fair at 177th Street and DeVoe Avenue.

The Bronx underwent rapid urban growth after World War I. Extensions of the New York City Subway contributed to the increase in population as thousands of immigrants came to the Bronx, resulting in a major boom in residential construction. Among these groups, many Irish Americans, Italian Americans, and especially Jewish Americans settled here. French, German, Polish, and other immigrants moved into the borough. As evidence of the change in population, by 1937, 592,185 Jews lived in the Bronx (43.9% of the borough's population), while only 54,000 Jews lived in the borough in 2011. Many synagogues still stand in the Bronx, but most have been converted to other uses.

==== Change ====
Bootleggers and gangs were active in the Bronx during Prohibition, between 1920 and 1933. Irish, Italian, Jewish, and Polish gangs smuggled in most of the illegal whiskey, and the oldest sections of the borough became poverty-stricken. Police Commissioner Richard Enright said that speakeasies provided a place for "the vicious elements, bootleggers, gamblers and their friends in all walks of life" to cooperate and to "evade the law, escape punishment for their crimes, [and] to deter the police from doing their duty".

In 1945, the Bronx Marian apparitions drew 30,000 pilgrims to the area to see the site of an alleged vision of the Virgin Mary.

Between 1930 and 1960, moderate and upper income Bronxites, predominantly non-Hispanic Whites, began to relocate from the borough's southwestern neighborhoods. This migration has left a mostly poor African American and Hispanic, largely Puerto Rican, population in the West Bronx. A significant factor that shifted the racial and economic demographics was the construction of Co-op City, built to house middle-class residents in family-sized apartments. The high-rise complex played a significant role in draining middle-class residents from older tenement buildings in the borough's southern and western fringes. Most predominantly non-Hispanic White communities today are in the eastern and northwestern sections of the borough.

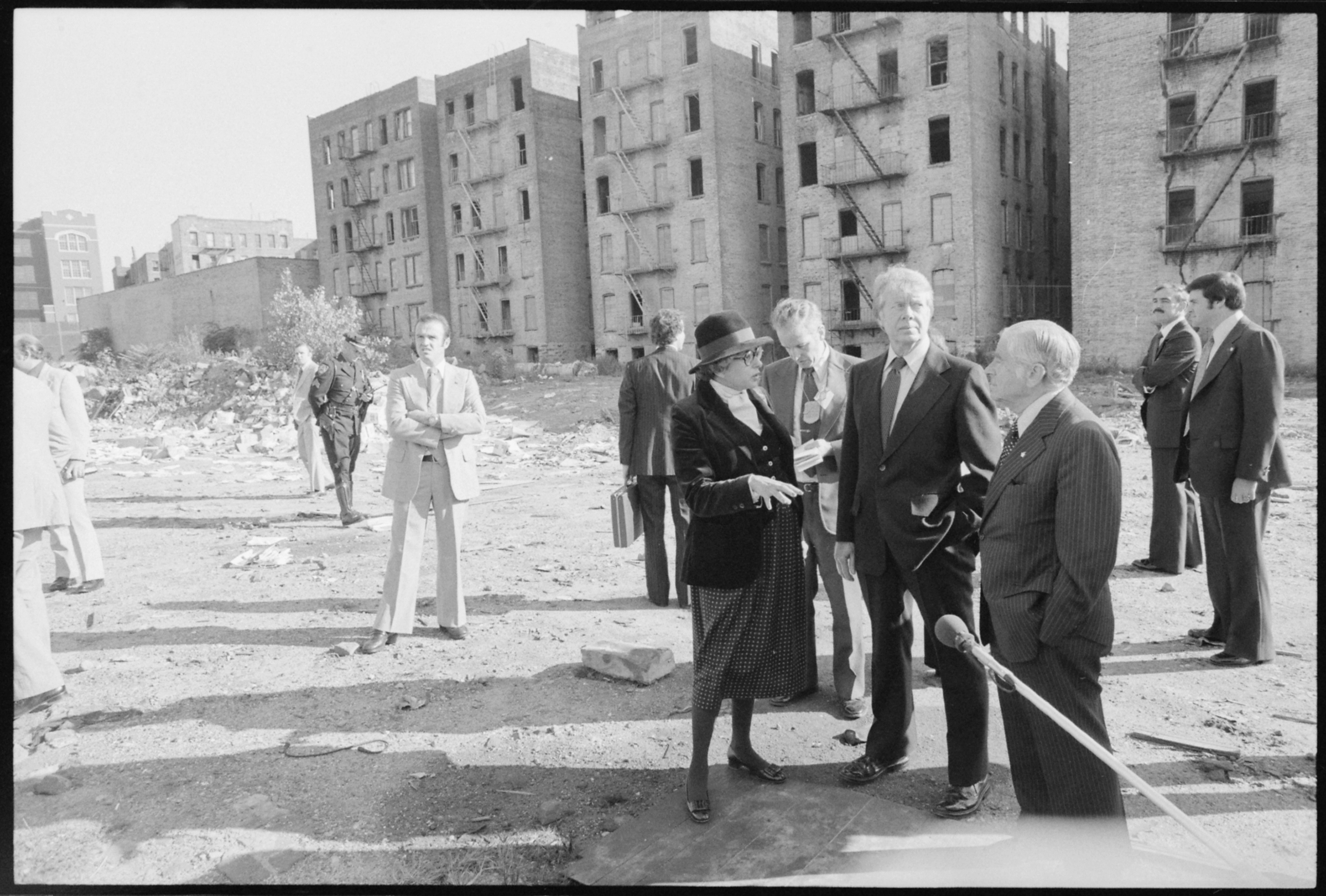
President Jimmy Carter and New York Mayor Abraham Beame tour the South Bronx in 1977

From the mid-1960s to the early 1980s, the quality of life changed for some Bronx residents. Historians and social scientists have suggested many factors, including the theory that Robert Moses' Cross Bronx Expressway destroyed existing residential neighborhoods and created instant slums, as put forward in Robert Caro's biography The Power Broker. Another factor in the Bronx's decline may have been the development of high-rise housing projects, particularly in the South Bronx. Yet another factor may have been a reduction in the real estate listings and property-related financial services offered in some areas of the Bronx, such as mortgage loans or insurance policies—a process known as redlining. Others have suggested a "planned shrinkage" of municipal services, such as fire-fighting. There was also much debate as to whether rent control laws had made it less profitable (or more costly) for landlords to maintain existing buildings with their existing tenants than to abandon or destroy those buildings.

In the 1970s, parts of the Bronx were plagued by a wave of arson. The burning of buildings was predominantly in the poorest communities, such as the South Bronx. One explanation of this event was that landlords decided to burn their low property-value buildings and take the insurance money, as it was easier for them to get insurance money than to try to refurbish a dilapidated building or sell a building in a severely distressed area. The Bronx became identified with a high rate of poverty and unemployment, which was mainly a persistent problem in the South Bronx. There were cases where tenants set fire to the building they lived in so they could qualify for emergency relocations by city social service agencies to better residences, sometimes being relocated to other parts of the city.

Out of 289 census tracts in the Bronx borough, 7 tracts lost more than 97% of their buildings to arson and abandonment between 1970 and 1980; another 44 tracts had more than 50% of their buildings meet the same fate. By the early 1980s, the Bronx was considered the most blighted urban area in the country, particularly the South Bronx which experienced a loss of 60% of the population and 40% of housing units. However, starting in the 1990s, many of the burned-out and run-down tenements were replaced by new housing units.

In May 1984, New York Supreme Court justice Peter J. McQuillan ruled that Marble Hill, Manhattan, was simultaneously part of the Borough of Manhattan (not the Borough of the Bronx) and part of Bronx County (not New York County) and the matter was definitively settled later that year when the New York Legislature overwhelmingly passed legislation declaring the neighborhood part of both New York County and the Borough of Manhattan and made this clarification retroactive to 1938, as reflected on the official maps of the city.

=== Revitalization ===
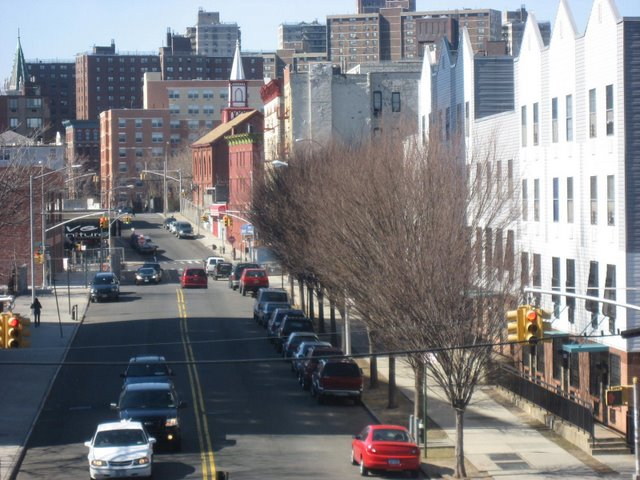
Row houses on a location where there was once burnt rubble. The Bronx has since seen revitalization.

Since the late 1980s, significant development has occurred in the Bronx, first stimulated by the city's "Ten-Year Housing Plan" and community members working to rebuild the social, economic and environmental infrastructure by creating affordable housing. Groups affiliated with churches in the South Bronx erected the Nehemiah Homes with about 1,000 units. The grass roots organization Nos Quedamos' endeavor known as Melrose Commons began to rebuild areas in the South Bronx. The IRT White Plains Road Line (2 and 5 trains) began to show an increase in riders. Chains such as Marshalls, Staples, and Target opened stores in the Bronx. More bank branches opened in the Bronx as a whole (rising from 106 in 1997 to 149 in 2007), although not primarily in poor or minority neighborhoods, while the Bronx still has fewer branches per person than other boroughs.

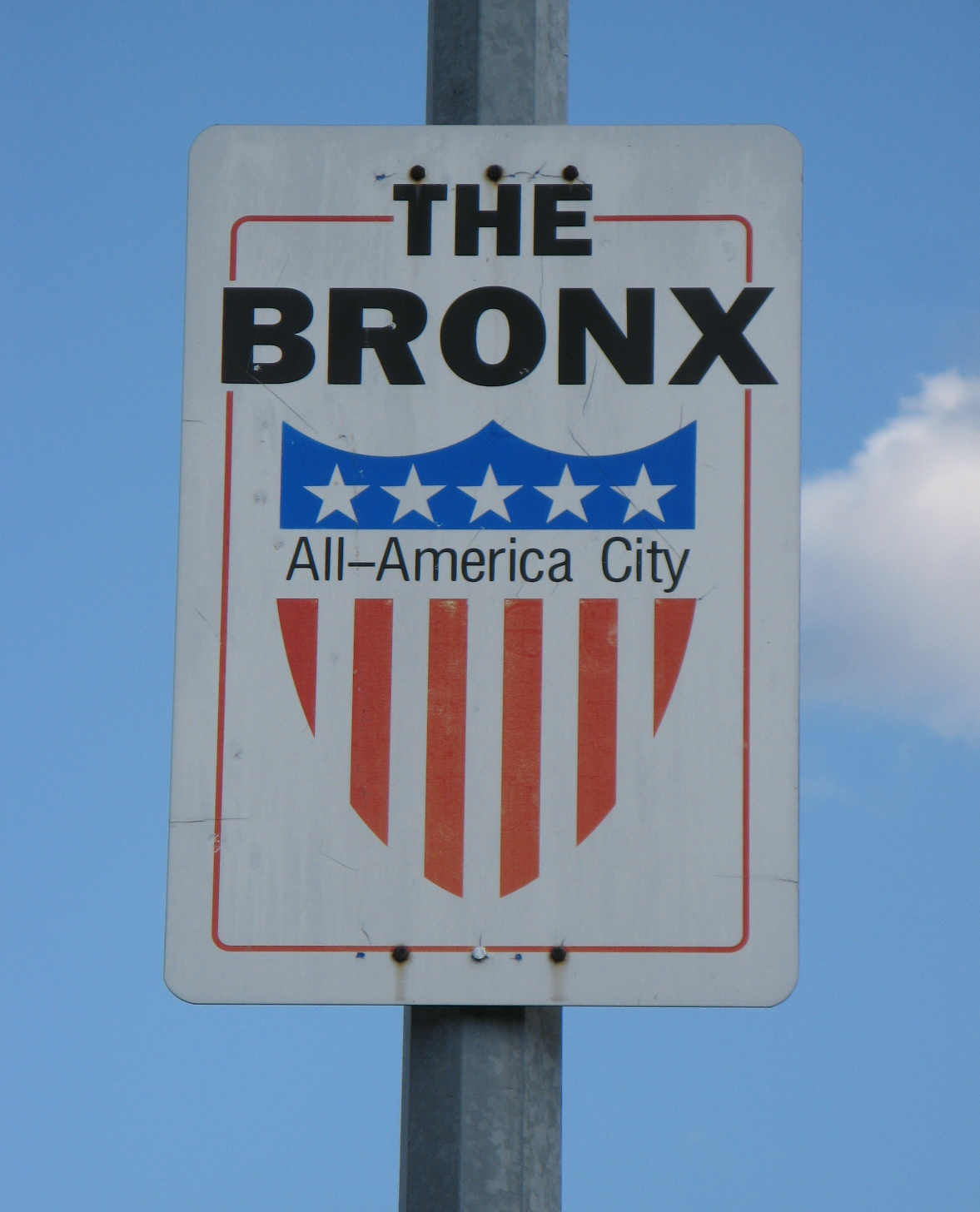
The Bronx – All-America City sign

In 1997, the Bronx was designated an All America City by the National Civic League, acknowledging its comeback from the decline of the mid-century. In 2006, The New York Times reported that "construction cranes have become the borough's new visual metaphor, replacing the window decals of the 1980s in which pictures of potted plants and drawn curtains were placed in the windows of abandoned buildings." The borough has experienced substantial new building construction since 2002. Between 2002 and June 2007, 33,687 new units of housing were built or were under way and $4.8 billion has been invested in new housing. In the first six months of 2007 alone total investment in new residential development was $965 million and 5,187 residential units were scheduled to be completed. Much of the new development is springing up in formerly vacant lots across the South Bronx.

In addition there came a revitalization of the existing housing market in areas such as Hunts Point, the Lower Concourse, and the neighborhoods surrounding the Third Avenue Bridge as people buy apartments and renovate them. Several boutique and chain hotels opened in the 2010s in the South Bronx.

New developments are underway. The Bronx General Post Office on the corner of the Grand Concourse and East 149th Street is being converted into a market place, boutiques, restaurants and office space with a USPS concession. The Kingsbridge Armory, often cited as the largest armory in the world, is currently slated for redevelopment. Under consideration for future development is the construction of a platform over the New York City Subway's Concourse Yard adjacent to Lehman College. The construction permitted approximately 2,000,000 square feet (190,000 m^{2}) of development and cost US$350–500 million.

Despite significant investment compared to the post war period, many exacerbated social problems remain including high rates of violent crime, substance abuse, overcrowding, and substandard housing conditions. The Bronx has the highest rate of poverty in New York City, and the greater South Bronx is the poorest area. Recently, The Bronx and The South Bronx have recorded its lowest homicide rates since the early to mid 20th century.

== Geography ==
The location of the Bronx (red) within New York City

=== Location and physical features ===
According to the U.S. Census Bureau, Bronx County has a total area of 57 square miles (150 km^{2}), of which 42 square miles (110 km^{2}) is land and 15 square miles (39 km^{2}) (27%) is water.

The Bronx is New York City's northernmost borough, New York State's southernmost mainland county and the only part of New York City that is almost entirely on the North American mainland, unlike the other four boroughs that are either islands or located on islands. The bedrock of the West Bronx is primarily Fordham gneiss, a high-grade heavily banded metamorphic rock containing significant amounts of pink feldspar. Marble Hill – politically part of Manhattan but now physically attached to the Bronx – is so-called because of the formation of Inwood marble there as well as in Inwood, Manhattan, and parts of the Bronx and Westchester County.

The Hudson River separates the Bronx on the west from Alpine, Tenafly and Englewood Cliffs in Bergen County, New Jersey. The Harlem River separates it from the island of Manhattan to the southwest. The East River separates it from Queens to the southeast. To the east, Long Island Sound separates it from Nassau County in western Long Island. Directly north of the Bronx are (from west to east) the adjoining Westchester County communities of Yonkers, Mount Vernon, Pelham Manor and New Rochelle. There is also a short southern land boundary with Marble Hill in the Borough of Manhattan, over the filled-in former course of the Spuyten Duyvil Creek; Marble Hill's postal ZIP code, telephonic area codes and fire service, however, are shared with the Bronx and not Manhattan.

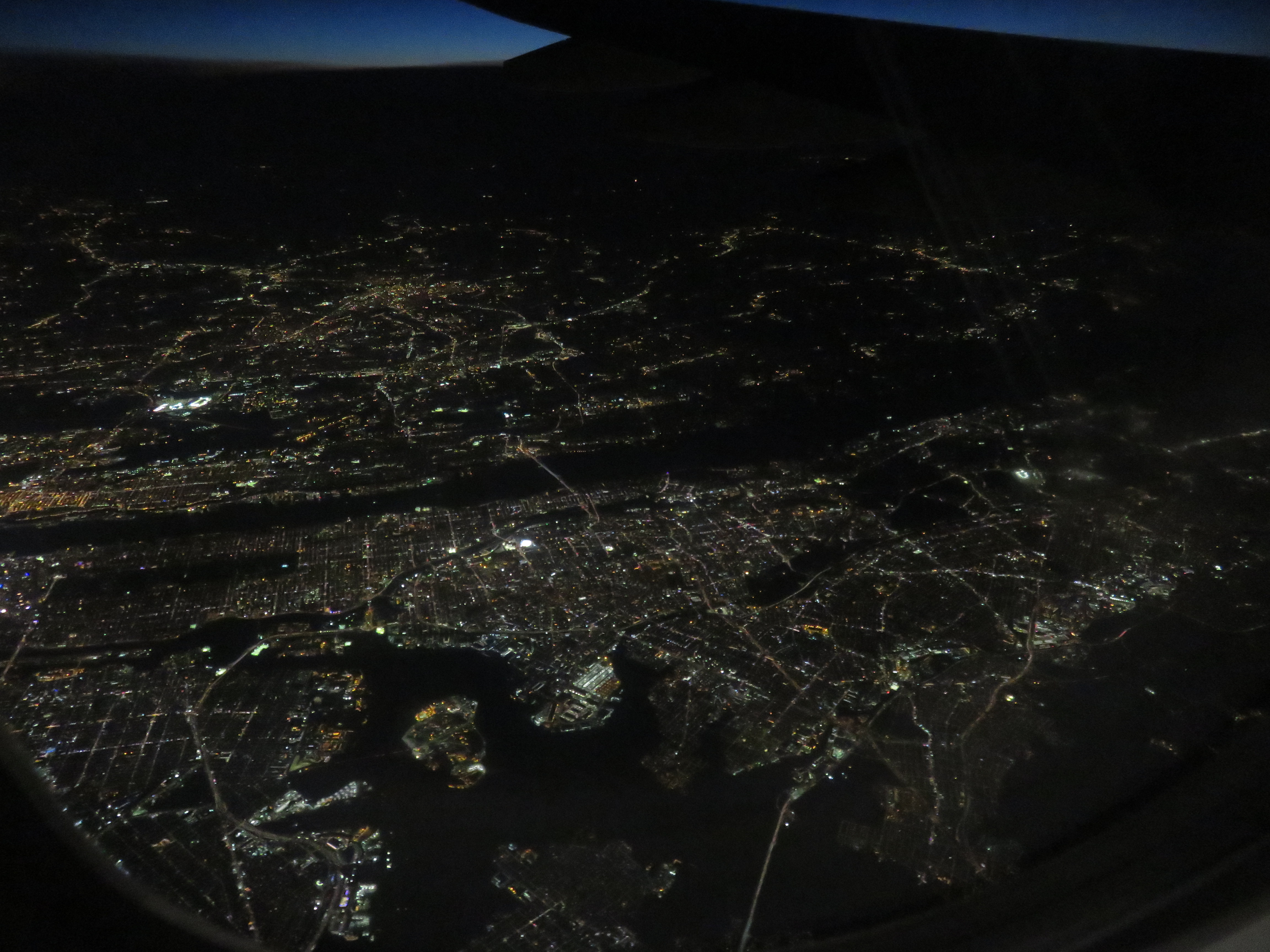
An aerial view of the Bronx from the east at night

The Bronx River flows south from Westchester County through the borough, emptying into the East River; it is the only entirely freshwater river in New York City. It separates the West Bronx from the schist of the East Bronx. A smaller river, the Hutchinson River (named after the religious leader Anne Hutchinson, killed along its banks in 1641), passes through the East Bronx and empties into Eastchester Bay.

The Bronx includes several small islands in the East River and Long Island Sound, such as City Island and Hart Island. Rikers Island in the East River, home to the large jail complex for the entire city, is also part of the Bronx.

The Bronx's highest elevation at 280 feet (85 m) is in the northwest corner, west of Van Cortlandt Park and in the Chapel Farm area near the Riverdale Country School. The opposite (southeastern) side of the Bronx has four large low peninsulas or "necks" of low-lying land that jut into the waters of the East River and were once salt marsh: Hunt's Point, Clason's Point, Screvin's Neck and Throggs Neck. Further up the coastline, Rodman's Neck lies between Pelham Bay Park in the northeast and City Island. The Bronx's irregular shoreline extends for 75 square miles (194 km^{2}).

=== Parks and open space ===
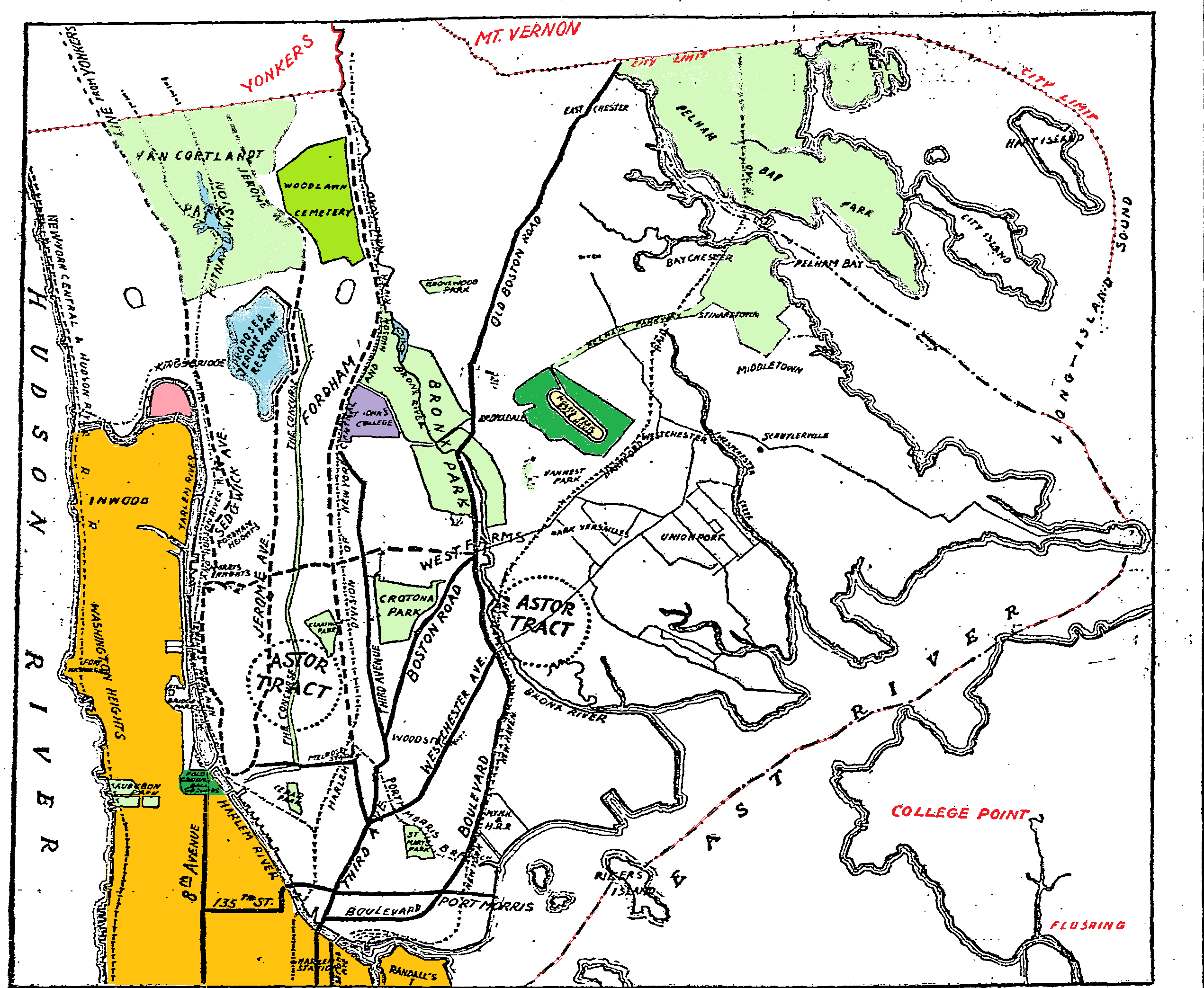
An 1896 New York Times map of parks and transit in the newly annexed Bronx. Marble Hill is in pink, cut off by water from the rest of Manhattan in orange. Van Cortlandt, Pelham Bay and Crotona Parks are light green, as is Bronx Park (now home to the New York Botanical Garden and Bronx Zoo). Woodlawn Cemetery is medium green, sports facilities are dark green. The not-yet-built Jerome Park Reservoir light blue, St. John's College (now Fordham University) is violet, and the city limits of the newly expanded New York are red.

Sample of open spaces and parks in the Bronx
Acquired	Name	acres	sq. mi.	hectares
1863	Woodlawn Cemetery	400	0.6	162
1888	Pelham Bay Park	2,772	4.3	1,122
1888	Van Cortlandt Park	1,146	1.8	464
1888	Bronx Park	718	1.1	291
1888	Crotona Park	128	0.2	52
1888	St. Mary's Park	35	0.05	14
1890	Jerome Park Reservoir	94	0.15	38
1897	St. James Park	11	0.02	4.6
1899	Macombs Dam Park †	28	0.04	12
1909	Henry Hudson Park	9	0.01	4
1937	Ferry Point Park	414	0.65	168
1937	Soundview Park	196	0.31	79
1962	Wave Hill	21	0.03	8.5
Land area of the Bronx in 2000		26,897	42.0	10,885
Water area		9,855	15.4	3,988
Total area		36,752	57.4	14,873
† closed in 2007 to build a new park & Yankee Stadium
Main source: New York City Department of Parks & Recreation

Although Bronx County was the third most densely populated county in the United States in 2022 (after Manhattan and Brooklyn), 7,000 acres (28 km^{2}) of the Bronx—about one fifth of the Bronx's area, and one quarter of its land area—is given over to parkland. The vision of a system of major Bronx parks connected by park-like thoroughfares is usually attributed to John Mullaly.

Woodlawn Cemetery, located on 400 acres (160 ha) and one of the largest cemeteries in New York City, sits on the western bank of the Bronx River near Yonkers. It opened in 1863, in what was then the town of Yonkers, at the time a rural area. Since the first burial in 1865, more than 300,000 people have been interred there.

The borough's northern side includes the largest park in New York City—Pelham Bay Park, which includes Orchard Beach—and the third-largest, Van Cortlandt Park, which is west of Woodlawn Cemetery and borders Yonkers. Also in the northern Bronx, Wave Hill, the former estate of George W. Perkins—known for a historic house, gardens, changing site-specific art installations and concerts—overlooks the New Jersey Palisades from a promontory on the Hudson in Riverdale.

Nearer the borough's center, and along the Bronx River, is Bronx Park. Its northern end houses the New York Botanical Gardens, which preserve the last patch of the original hemlock forest that once covered the county, and its southern end the Bronx Zoo, the largest urban zoological gardens in the United States. In 1904, the Chestnut Blight pathogen (Cryphonectria parasitica) was found for the first time outside of Asia, at the Bronx Zoo. Over the next 40 years it spread throughout eastern North America and killed back essentially every American Chestnut (Castanea dentata), causing ecological and economic devastation.

Just south of Van Cortlandt Park is the Jerome Park Reservoir, surrounded by 2 miles (3 km) of stone walls and bordering several small parks in the Bedford Park neighborhood; the reservoir was built in the 1890s on the site of the former Jerome Park Racetrack. Further south is Crotona Park, home to a 3.3-acre (1.3 ha) lake, 28 species of trees, and a large swimming pool. The land for these parks, and many others, was bought by New York City in 1888, while land was still open and inexpensive, in anticipation of future needs and future pressures for development.

Some of the acquired land was set aside for the Grand Concourse and Pelham Parkway, the first of a series of boulevards and parkways, thoroughfares lined with trees, vegetation and greenery. Later projects included the Bronx River Parkway, which developed a road while restoring the riverbank and reducing pollution, Mosholu Parkway and the Henry Hudson Parkway.

In 2006, a five-year, $220-million program of capital improvements and natural restoration in 70 Bronx parks was begun (financed by water and sewer revenues) as part of an agreement that allowed a water filtration plant under Mosholu Golf Course in Van Cortlandt Park. One major focus is on opening more of the Bronx River's banks and restoring them to a natural state.

=== Adjacent counties ===
The Bronx adjoins:

- Westchester County – north
- Nassau County – southeast (across the East River)
- Queens County (Queens) – south (across the East River)
- New York County (Manhattan) – southwest
- Bergen County, New Jersey – west (across the Hudson River)

== Divisions of the Bronx ==
=== Regional divisions ===
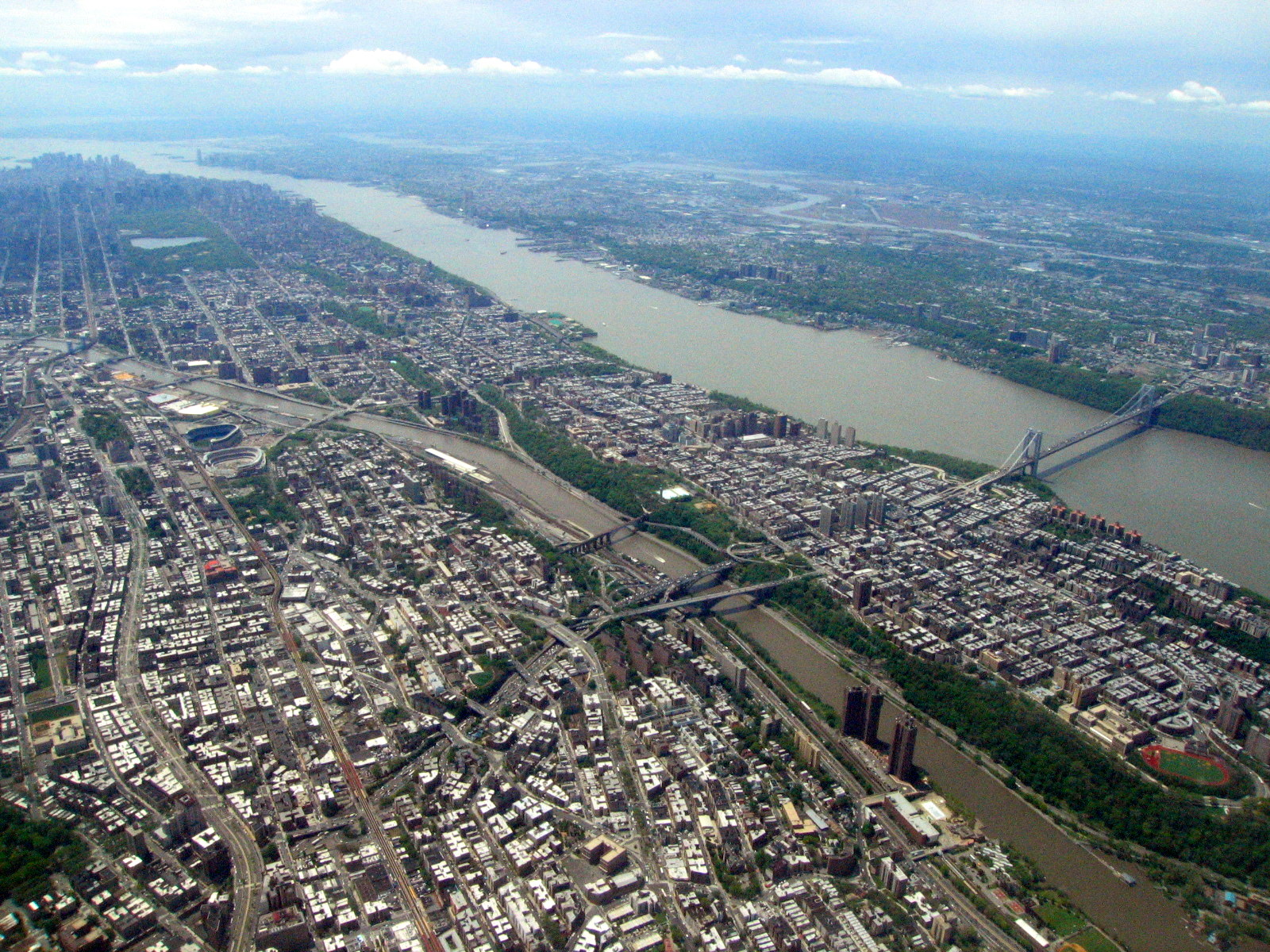
An aerial view of the Bronx, Harlem River, Harlem, Hudson River and George Washington Bridge

There are two primary systems for dividing the Bronx into regions, which do not necessarily agree with one another. One system is based on the Bronx River, while the other strictly separates South Bronx from the rest of the borough.

The Bronx River divides the borough nearly in half, putting the earlier-settled, more urban, and hillier sections in the west and the newer, more suburban coastal sections in the east. It is an accurate reflection on the Bronx's history considering that the towns that existed in the area prior to annexation to the City of New York generally did not straddle the Bronx River. In addition, what is today the Bronx was annexed to New York City in two stages: areas west of the Bronx River were annexed in 1874, while areas to the east of the river were annexed in 1895.

- West Bronx: all parts of the Bronx west of the Bronx River (as opposed to Jerome Avenue – this street is simply the "east-west" divider for designating numbered streets as "east" or "west". As the Bronx's numbered streets continue from Manhattan to south, on which the street numbering system is based, Jerome Avenue actually represents a longitudinal halfway point for Manhattan, not the Bronx.)
- East Bronx: all parts of the Bronx east of the Bronx River (as opposed to Jerome Avenue)

Under this system, the Bronx can be further divided into the following regions:

- Northwest Bronx: the northern half of the West Bronx; the area north of Fordham Road and west of the Bronx River
- Southwest Bronx: the southern half of the West Bronx; the area south of Fordham Road and west of the Bronx River
- Northeast Bronx: the northern half of the East Bronx; the area north of Pelham Parkway and east of the Bronx River
- Southeast Bronx: the southern half of the East Bronx; the area south of Pelham Parkway and east of the Bronx River

A second system divides the borough first and foremost into the following sections:

- North Bronx: all areas not in the South Bronx (Southwest Bronx) – i.e. the Northwest Bronx, Northeast Bronx, and Southeast Bronx
- South Bronx: the Southwest Bronx – south of Fordham Road and west of the Bronx River. This includes the areas traditionally considered part of the South Bronx.

=== Neighborhoods ===
The number, locations, and boundaries of the Bronx's neighborhoods (many of them sitting on the sites of 19th-century villages) have become unclear with time and successive waves of newcomers. Even city officials do not necessarily agree. In a 2006 article for The New York Times, Manny Fernandez described the disagreement:

According to a Department of City Planning map of the city's neighborhoods, the Bronx has 49. The map publisher Hagstrom identifies 69. The borough president, Adolfo Carrión Jr., says 61. The Mayor's Community Assistance Unit, in a listing of the borough's community boards, names 68.

Major neighborhoods of the Bronx include the following.

=== East Bronx ===
(Bronx Community Districts 9 [south central], 10 [east], 11 [east central] and 12 [north central])

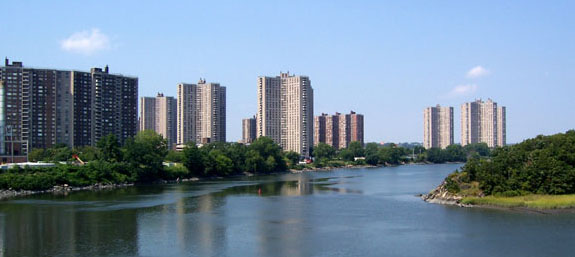
The neighborhood of Co-op City is the largest cooperative housing development in the world.

East of the Bronx River, the borough is relatively flat and includes four large low peninsulas, or 'necks,' of low-lying land which jut into the waters of the East River and were once saltmarsh: Hunts Point, Clason's Point, Screvin's Neck (Castle Hill Point) and Throgs Neck. The East Bronx has older tenement buildings, low income public housing complexes, and multifamily homes, as well as single family homes. It includes New York City's largest park: Pelham Bay Park along the Westchester-Bronx border.

Neighborhoods include: Clason's Point, Harding Park, Soundview, Castle Hill, Parkchester (Community District 9); Throggs Neck, Country Club, City Island, Pelham Bay, Edgewater Park, Co-op City (Community District 10); Westchester Square, Van Nest, Pelham Parkway, Morris Park (Community District 11); Williamsbridge, Eastchester, Baychester, Edenwald and Wakefield (Community District 12).

==== City Island and Hart Island ====
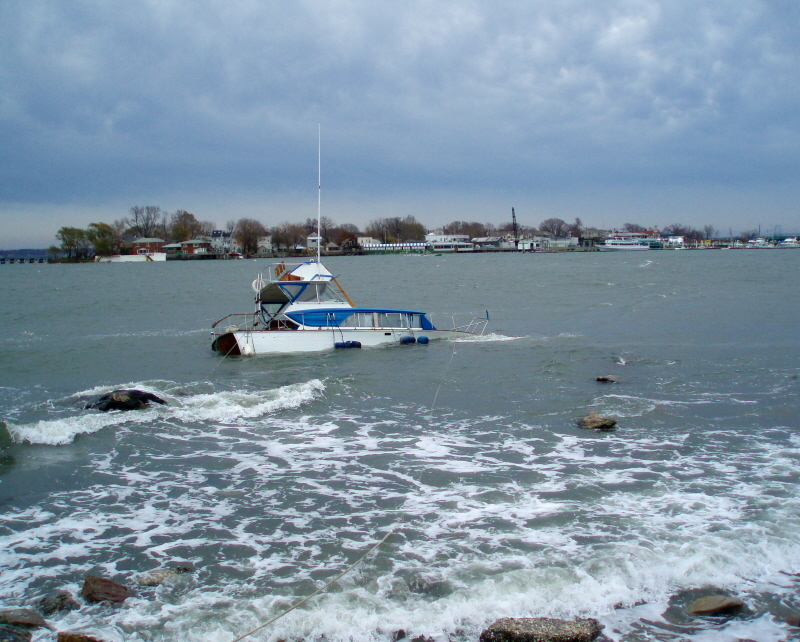
A sunken boat off the shore of City Island

(Bronx Community District 10)

City Island is east of Pelham Bay Park in Long Island Sound and is known for its seafood restaurants and private waterfront homes. City Island's single shopping street, City Island Avenue, is reminiscent of a small New England town. It is connected to Rodman's Neck on the mainland by the City Island Bridge.

East of City Island is Hart Island, which is uninhabited and not open to the public. It once served as a prison and now houses New York City's potter's field for unclaimed bodies.

=== West Bronx ===
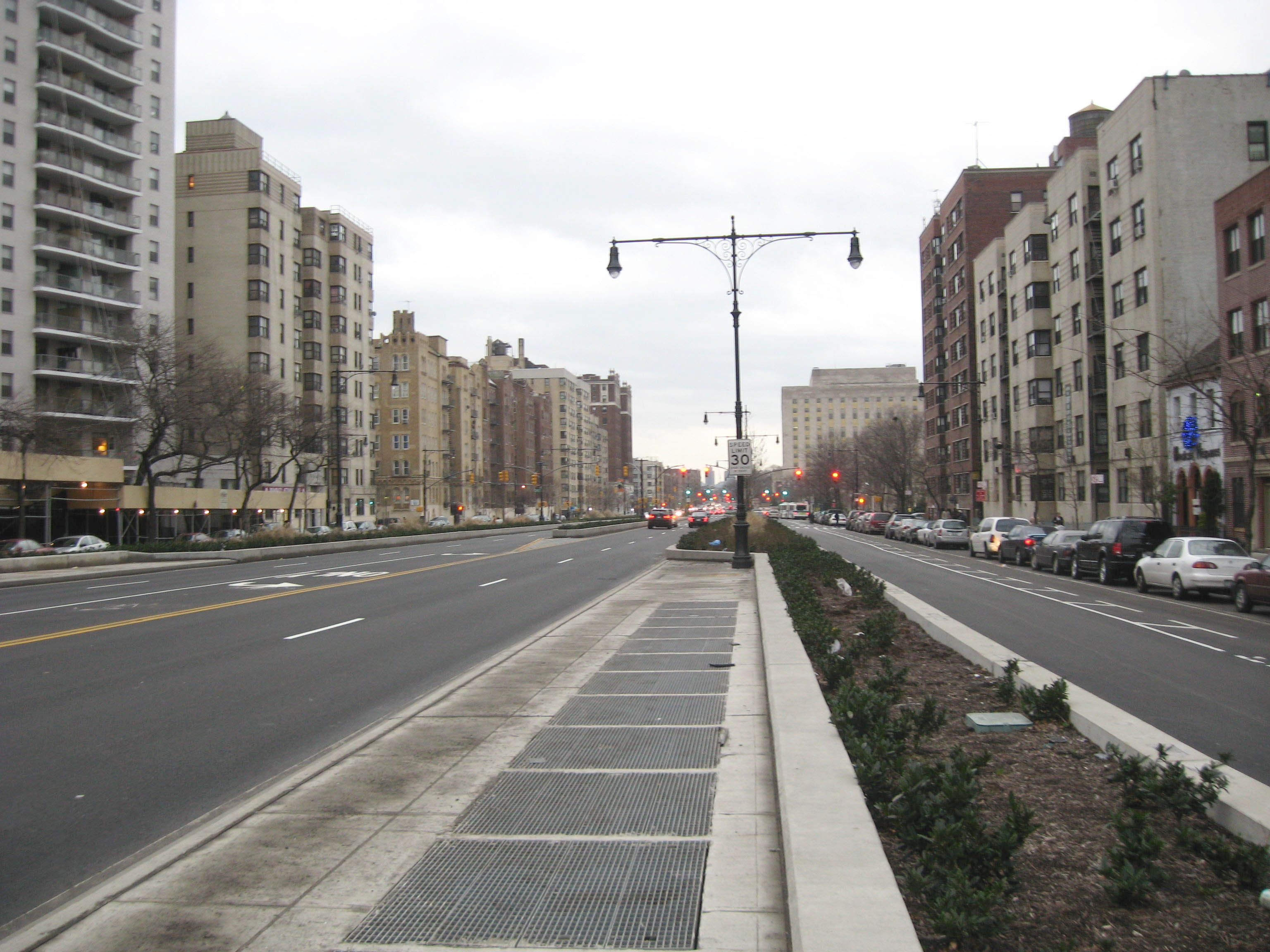
Grand Concourse at East 165th Street in 2008

(Bronx Community Districts 1 to 8, progressing roughly from south to northwest)

The western parts of the Bronx are hillier and are dominated by a series of parallel ridges, running south to north. The West Bronx has older apartment buildings, low income public housing complexes, multifamily homes in its lower income areas as well as larger single family homes in more affluent areas such as Riverdale and Fieldston. It includes New York City's third-largest park: Van Cortlandt Park along the Westchester-Bronx border. The Grand Concourse, a wide boulevard, runs through it, north to south.

==== Northwestern Bronx ====
(Bronx Community Districts 7 [between the Bronx and Harlem Rivers] and 8 [facing the Hudson River] – plus part of Board 12)

Neighborhoods include: Fordham-Bedford, Bedford Park, Norwood, Kingsbridge Heights (Community District 7), Kingsbridge, Riverdale (Community District 8), and Woodlawn Heights (Community District 12). (Marble Hill, Manhattan is now connected by land to the Bronx rather than Manhattan and is served by Bronx Community District 8.)

==== South Bronx ====
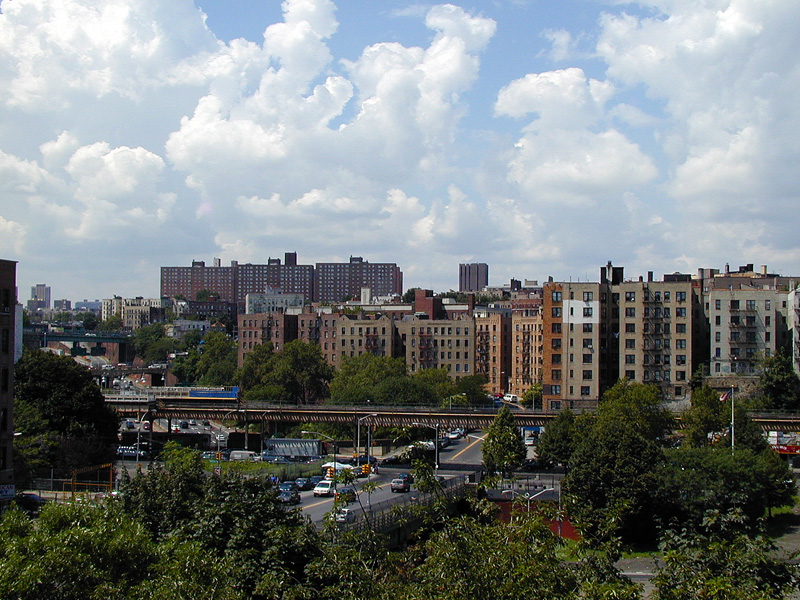
Morris Heights, a Bronx neighborhood of over 45,000

(Bronx Community Districts 1 to 6 plus part of CD 7—progressing northwards, CDs 2, 3 and 6 border the Bronx River from its mouth to Bronx Park, while 1, 4, 5 and 7 face Manhattan across the Harlem River)

Like other neighborhoods in New York City, the South Bronx has no official boundaries. The name has been used to represent poverty in the Bronx and is applied to progressively more northern places so that by the 2000s, Fordham Road was often used as a northern limit. The Bronx River more consistently forms an eastern boundary. The South Bronx has many high-density apartment buildings, low income public housing complexes, many mixed income and affordable housing units, luxury apartments, and multi-unit homes. The South Bronx is home to the Bronx County Courthouse, Borough Hall, and other government buildings, as well as Yankee Stadium, the Bronx Museum of the Arts (BXmA), The Bronx Children’s Museum, Lincoln Hospital, Franz Sigel Park, and The High Bridge. The Cross Bronx Expressway bisects it, east to west. The South Bronx has some of the poorest neighborhoods in the country, as well historically high crime areas and has recently recorded its lowest crime rates in history.

Neighborhoods include: The Hub (a retail district at Third Avenue and East 149th Street), Port Morris, Mott Haven (Community District 1), Melrose (Community District 1 & Community District 3), Morrisania, East Morrisania [also known as Crotona Park East] (Community District 3), Hunts Point, Longwood (Community District 2), Highbridge, Concourse (Community District 4), West Farms, Belmont, East Tremont (Community District 6), Tremont, Morris Heights (Community District 5), University Heights. (Community District 5 & Community District 7).

== Demographics ==
Historical population
Census	Pop.	Note	%±
1790	1,781		—
1800	1,755		−1.5%
1810	2,267		29.2%
1820	2,782		22.7%
1830	3,023		8.7%
1840	5,346		76.8%
1850	8,032		50.2%
1860	23,593		193.7%
1870	37,393		58.5%
1880	51,980		39.0%
1890	88,908		71.0%
1900	200,507		125.5%
1910	430,980		114.9%
1920	732,016		69.8%
1930	1,265,258		72.8%
1940	1,394,711		10.2%
1950	1,451,277		4.1%
1960	1,424,815		−1.8%
1970	1,471,701		3.3%
1980	1,168,972		−20.6%
1990	1,203,789		3.0%
2000	1,332,650		10.7%
2010	1,385,108		3.9%
2020	1,472,654		6.3%
2025 (est.)	1,406,332	▼	−4.5%
Sources: 1790–1990;

New York City's five boroughs
Jurisdiction		Population	Land area		Density of population		GDP
Borough	County	Census (2020)	square miles	square km	people/ sq. mile	people/ sq. km	billions (US$, 2024) ^{2}
The Bronx	Bronx	1,472,654	42.2	109.2	34,920	13,482	58.323
Brooklyn	Kings	2,736,074	69.4	179.7	39,438	15,227	145.934
Manhattan	New York	1,694,251	22.7	58.7	74,781	28,872	1,006.673
Queens	Queens	2,405,464	108.7	281.6	22,125	8,542	143.131
Staten Island	Richmond	495,747	57.5	149.0	8,618	3,327	23.779
City of New York		8,804,190	300.5	778.2	29,303	11,314	1,354.061
State of New York		20,201,249	47,123.6	122,049.5	429	166	2,297.028
Sources: and see individual borough articles.

=== Race, ethnicity, language, and immigration ===
Race	2021	2020	2010	1990	1970	1950
White	14.3%	14.1%	27.9%	35.7%	73.4%	93.1%
—Non-Hispanic	9.0%	8.9%	10.9%	22.6%	N/A	N/A
Black or African American	33.8%	33.1%	36.5%	37.3%	24.3%	6.7%
Hispanic or Latino (of any race)	56.4%	54.8%	53.5%	43.5%	27.7%	N/A
Asian	4.7%	4.7%	3.6%	3%	0.5%	0.1%
Two or more races	3.8%	13.0%	5.3%	N/A	N/A	N/A

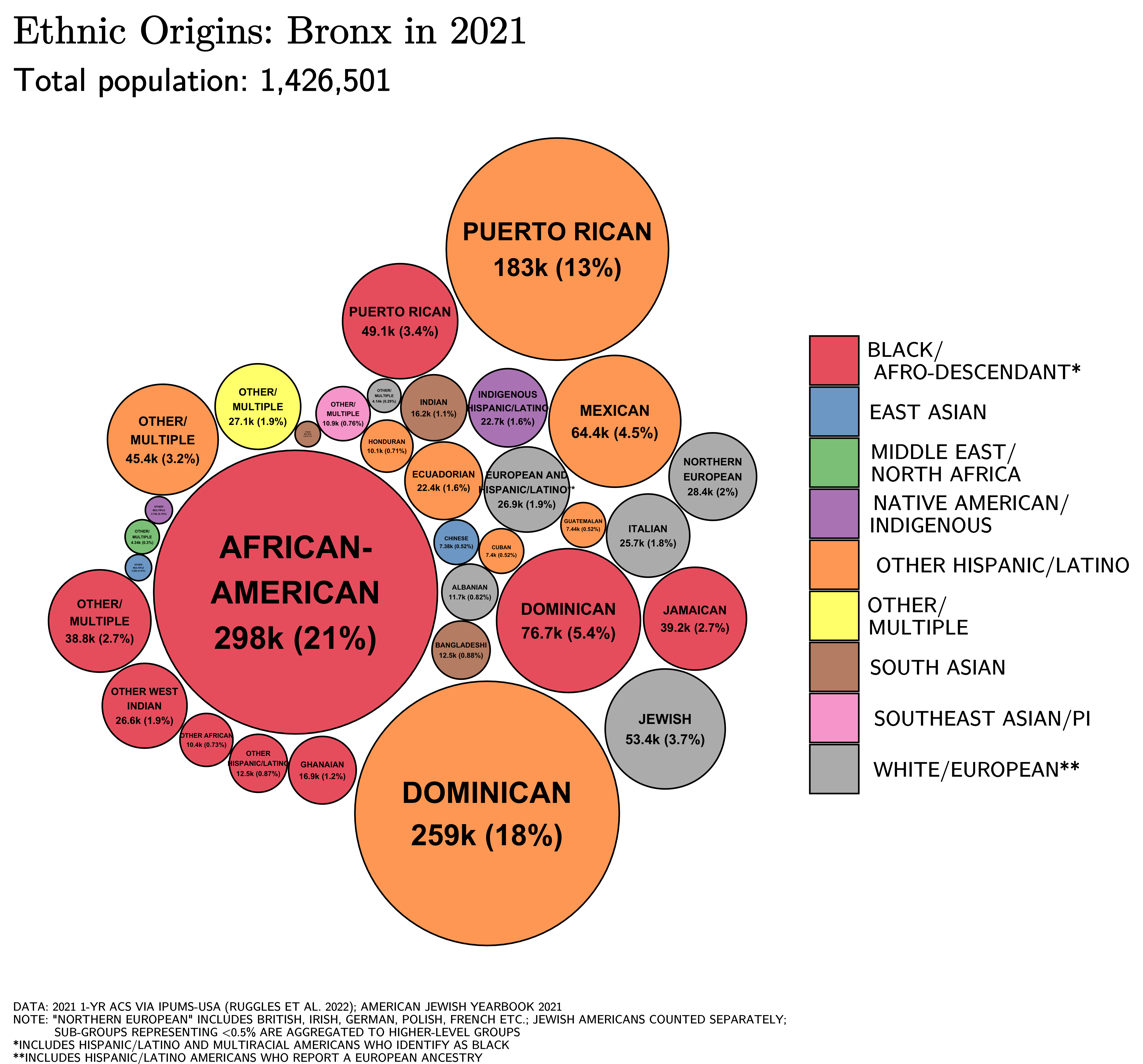
Ethnic origins in the Bronx

==== 2018 estimates ====
The borough's most populous racial group, White, declined from 99.3% in 1920 to 14.9% in 2018.

The Bronx has 532,487 housing units, with a median value of $371,800, and with an owner-occupancy rate of 19.7%, the lowest of the five boroughs. There are 495,356 households, with 2.85 persons per household. 59.3% of residents speak a language besides English at home, the highest rate of the five boroughs.

In the Bronx, the population is 7.2% under 5, 17.6% 6–18, 62.4% 19–64, and 12.8% over 65. 52.9% of the population is female. 35.3% of residents are foreign born.

The per capita income is $19,721, while the median household income is $36,593, both being the lowest of the five boroughs. 27.9% of residents live below the poverty line, the highest of the five boroughs.

==== 2010 census ====
According to the 2010 Census, 53.5% of Bronx's population was of Hispanic, Latino, or Spanish origin (they may be of any race); 30.1% non-Hispanic Black or African American, 10.9% of the population was non-Hispanic White, 3.4% non-Hispanic Asian, 1.2% of two or more races (non-Hispanic), and 0.6% from some other race (non-Hispanic).

As of 2010, 46.29% (584,463) of Bronx residents aged five and older spoke Spanish at home, while 44.02% (555,767) spoke English, 2.48% (31,361) African languages, 0.91% (11,455) French, 0.90% (11,355) Italian, 0.87% (10,946) various Indic languages, 0.70% (8,836) other Indo-European languages, and Chinese was spoken at home by 0.50% (6,610) of the population over the age of five. In total, 55.98% (706,783) of the Bronx's population age five and older spoke a language at home other than English. A Garifuna-speaking community from Honduras and Guatemala also makes the Bronx its home.

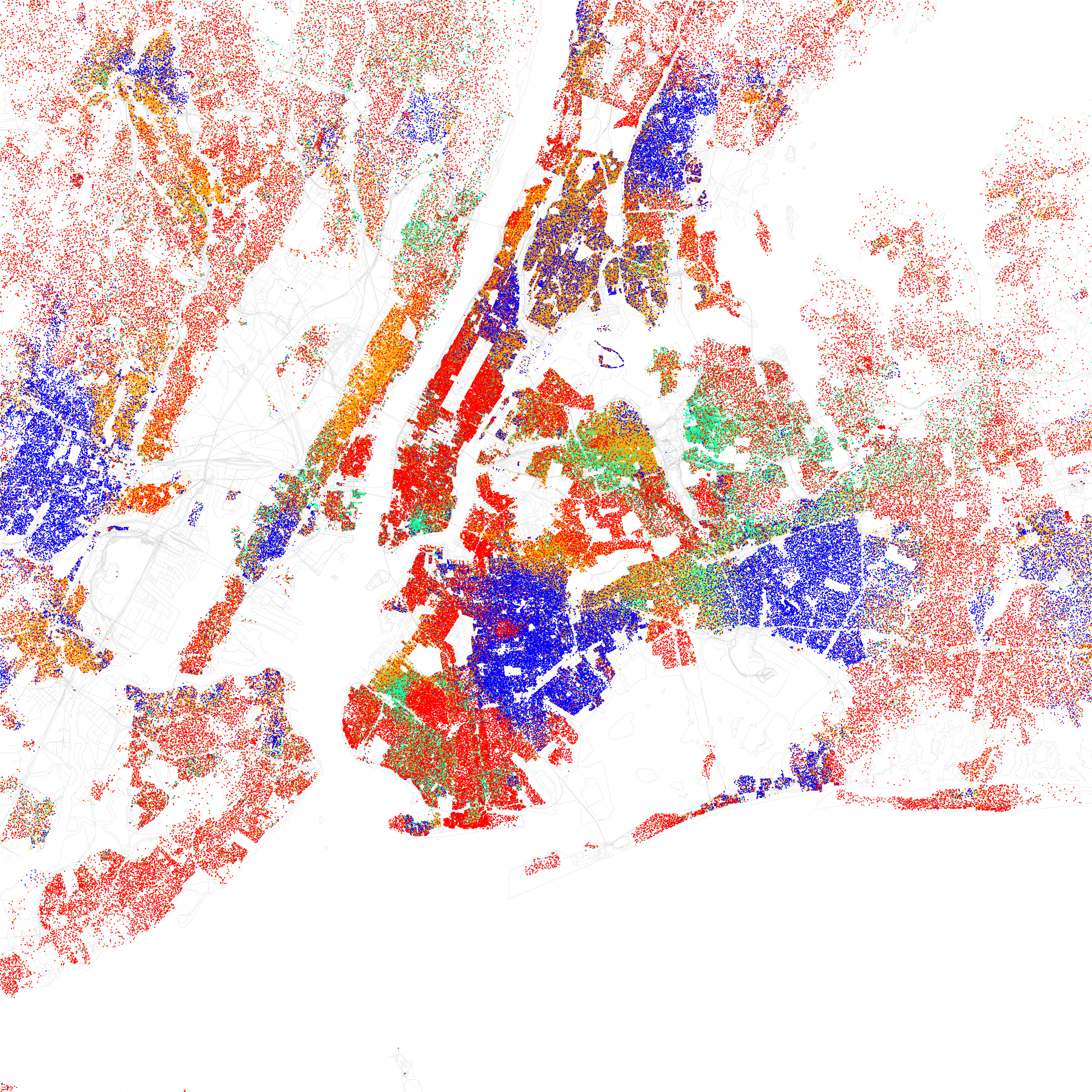
Map of racial distribution in New York, 2010 U.S. Census. Each dot is 25 people: White, Black, Asian, Hispanic, or Other (yellow)

==== 2009 community survey ====
The Bronx is the only New York City borough with a Hispanic majority, many of whom are Puerto Ricans and Dominicans. According to the 2009 American Community Survey, Black Americans were the second largest racial/ethnic group in the Bronx. Black people of both Hispanic and non-Hispanic origin represented over one-third (35.4%) of the Bronx's population. Black people of non-Hispanic origin made up 30.8% of the population. Over 495,200 Black people resided in the borough, of whom 87% were non-Hispanic. Over 61,000 people identified themselves as Sub-Saharan African in the survey, making up 4.4% of the population.

Multiracial Americans are also a sizable minority in the Bronx. People of multiracial heritage number over 41,800 individuals and represent 3.0% of the population. People of mixed African American and European American heritage number over 6,850 members and form 0.5% of the population. People of mixed Native American and European heritage number over 2,450 members and form 0.2% of the population. People of mixed Asian and European heritage number over 880 members and form 0.1% of the population. People of mixed African American and Native American heritage number over 1,220 members and form 0.1% of the population.

Out of all five boroughs, the Bronx has the lowest number and proportion of white residents. As of 2009, White Americans of both Hispanic and non-Hispanic origin represented over one-fifth (22.9%) of the Bronx's population, or 320,640 people. Non-Hispanic White people accounted for one-eighth of the population (12.1%, or 168,570 12.1%). This is in contrast to a century ago, when almost all Bronx residents were white (99.3% in 1920). That share fell to about one-third by 1980 (34.4%). As of 2009, White Americans of both Hispanic and non-Hispanic origin represented one-fifth (22.9%) of the Bronx's population, but counting non-Hispanic White people the proportion was under one-eighth (12.1%). The majority of the non-Hispanic European American population is of Italian and Irish descent. People of Italian descent numbered over 55,000 individuals and made up 3.9% of the population. People of Irish descent numbered over 43,500 individuals and made up 3.1% of the population. German Americans and Polish Americans made up 1.4% and 0.8% of the population respectively. The Bronx has the largest Albanian community in the United States. As of 2018, non-Hispanic White people account for about one in seven residents (14.9% in 2018).

==== Older estimates ====
The census of 1930 counted only 1.0% (12,930) of the Bronx's population as Negro (while making no distinct counts of Hispanic or Spanish-surname residents).

Foreign or overseas birthplaces of Bronx residents, 1930 and 2000
1930 United States census			2000 United States census		
Total population of the Bronx	1,265,258		Total population of the Bronx	1,332,650	
			All born abroad or overseas^{‡}	524,410	39.4%
			Puerto Rico	126,649	9.5%
Foreign-born Whites	477,342	37.7%	All foreign-born	385,827	29.0%
White persons born in Russia	135,210	10.7%	Dominican Republic	124,032	9.3%
White persons born in Italy	67,732	5.4%	Jamaica	51,120	3.8%
White persons born in Poland	55,969	4.4%	Mexico	20,962	1.6%
White persons born in Germany	43,349	3.4%	Guyana	14,868	1.1%
White persons born in the Irish Free State ^{†}	34,538	2.7%	Ecuador	14,800	1.1%
Other foreign birthplaces of Whites	140,544	11.1%	Other foreign birthplaces	160,045	12.0%
† now the Republic of Ireland			‡ beyond the 50 states and Washington, D.C.		

=== Population and housing ===
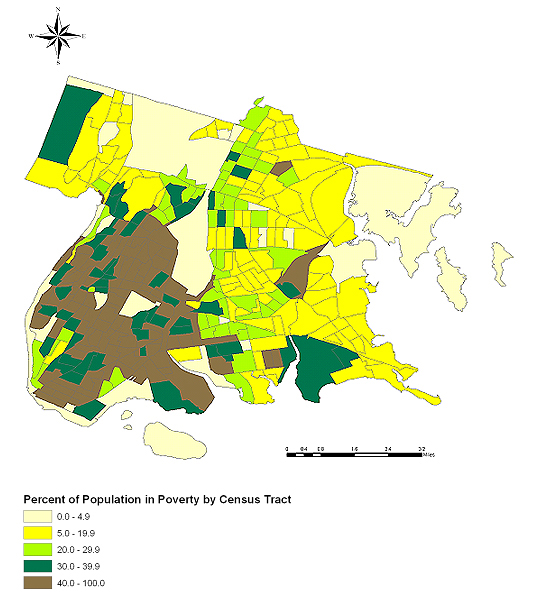
Poverty concentrations within the Bronx, by Census Tract as of 2008

As of the 2010 census, there were 1,385,108 people living in the Bronx, a 3.9% increase since 2000.

As of the 2000 United States census, there were 1,332,650 people, 463,212 households, and 314,984 families residing in the borough. The population density was 31,709.3 inhabitants per square mile (12,243.0 inhabitants/km^{2}). There were 490,659 housing units at an average density of 11,674.8 units per square mile (4,507.7 units/km^{2}). Census estimates place total population of Bronx county at 1,392,002 as of 2012.

There were 463,212 households, out of which 38.1% had children under the age of 18 living with them, 31.4% were married couples living together, 30.4% had a female householder with no husband present, and 32.0% were non-families. 27.4% of all households were made up of individuals, and 9.4% had someone living alone who was 65 years of age or older. The average household size was 2.78 and the average family size was 3.37.

The age distribution of the population in the Bronx were as follows: 29.8% under the age of 18, 10.6% from 18 to 24, 30.7% from 25 to 44, 18.8% from 45 to 64, and 10.1% 65 years of age or older. The median age was 31 years. For every 100 females, there were 87.0 males.

=== Individual and household income ===
The 1999 median income for a household in the borough was $27,611, and the median family income was $30,682. Men had a median income of $31,178 versus $29,429 for women. The per capita income for the borough was $13,959. About 28.0% of families and 30.7% of the population were below the poverty line, including 41.5% of those under age 18 and 21.3% of those age 65 or over. More than half of the neighborhoods in the Bronx are high poverty or extreme poverty areas.

From 2015 census data, the median income for a household was (in 2015 dollars) $34,299. Per capita income in past 12 months (in 2015 dollars): $18,456 with persons in poverty at 30.3%. Per the 2016 Census data, the median income for a household was $35,302. Per capita income was cited at $18,896.

== Culture and institutions ==
=== Sports ===
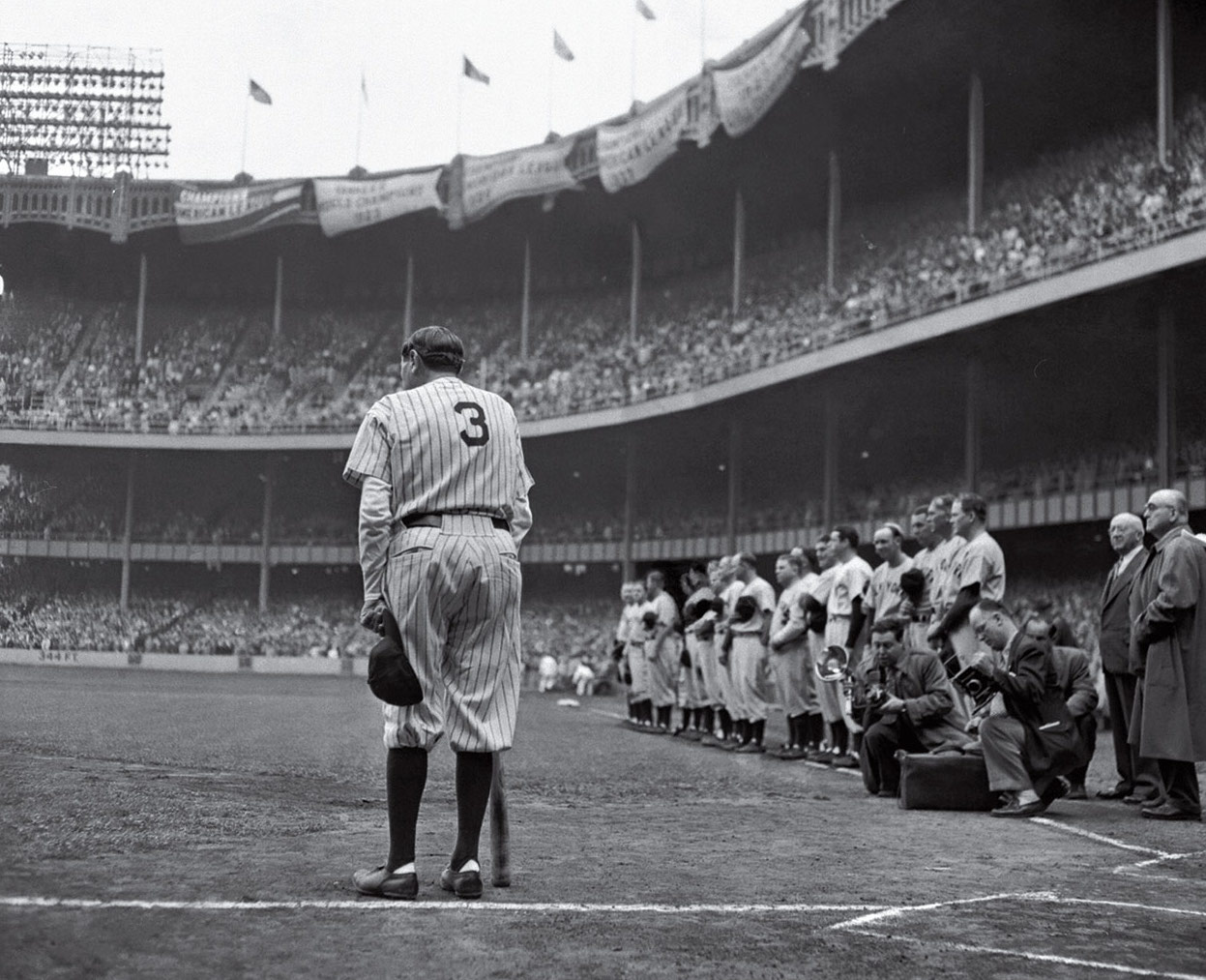
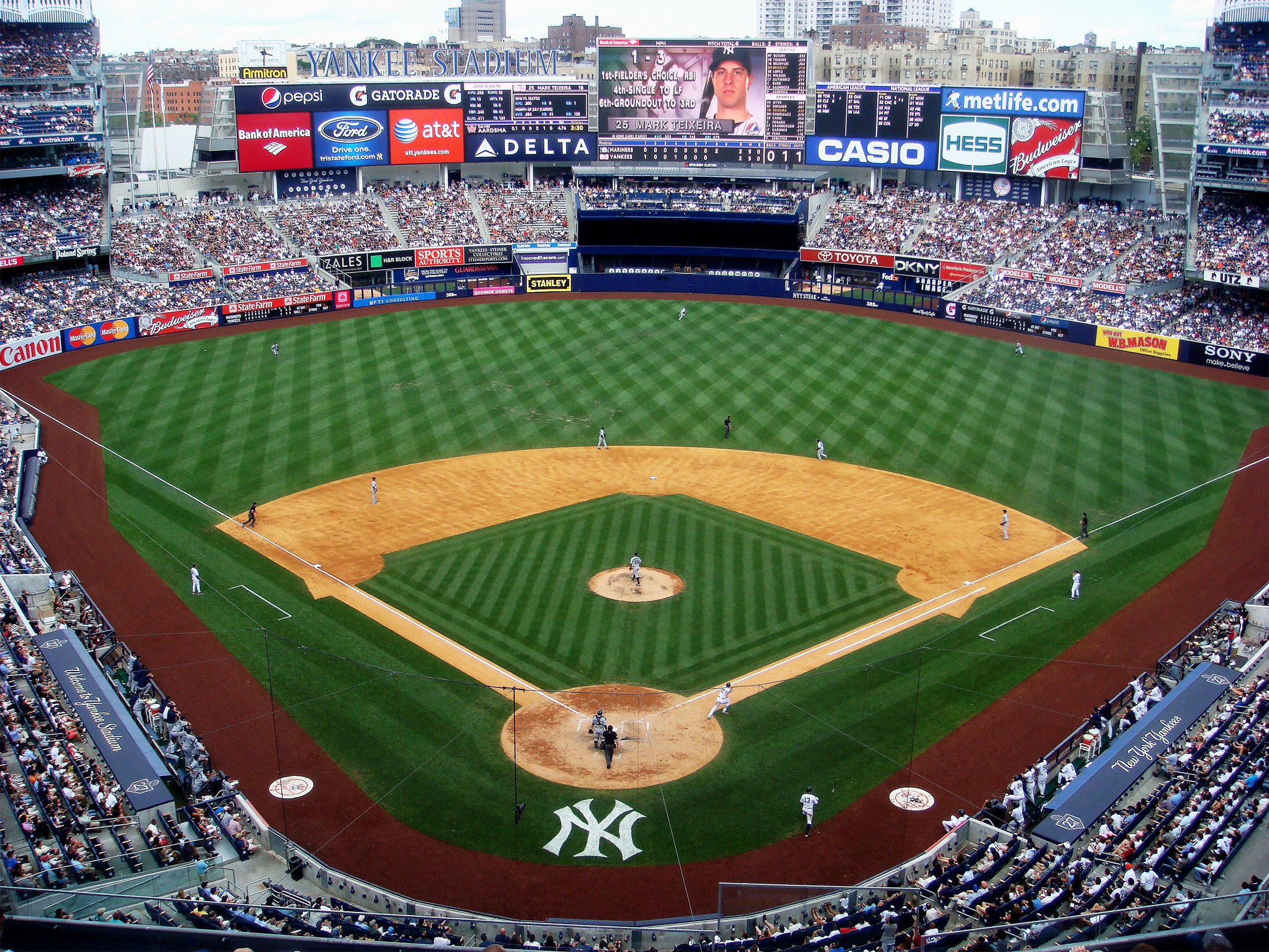
Babe Ruth, often considered the greatest baseball player of all time, is seen retiring from the Yankees in a Pulitzer prize-winning photograph in the Bronx's original Yankee Stadium (current field at right).

The Bronx is the home of the New York Yankees—nicknamed "the Bronx Bombers"—of Major League Baseball. The Yankees have won 27 World Series titles, more than any other team, and their roster has featured players like Babe Ruth, Lou Gehrig, Joe DiMaggio, Mickey Mantle, Derek Jeter, and Aaron Judge.

When the team's original Yankee Stadium opened in 1923, it was the largest baseball park. The field also hosted college football games, and was the home of two National Football League teams, the New York Yankees (1926–1929) and the New York Giants (1956–1973). In 2008, the park was replaced with the current Yankee Stadium.

The Bronx additionally hosts the only Major League Soccer team in the five boroughs, the New York City FC, which also plays in Yankee Stadium. Part of the New York City Marathon travels through the Bronx, including the notoriously difficult Mile 20. From 1889 to 1904, the borough used to have a horse racing facility, the Morris Park Racecourse. In its later years, the course was used for motor racing: a new land speed record was reached on the track. College teams in the Bronx include the Fordham Rams and the Lehman Lightning.

=== Music ===
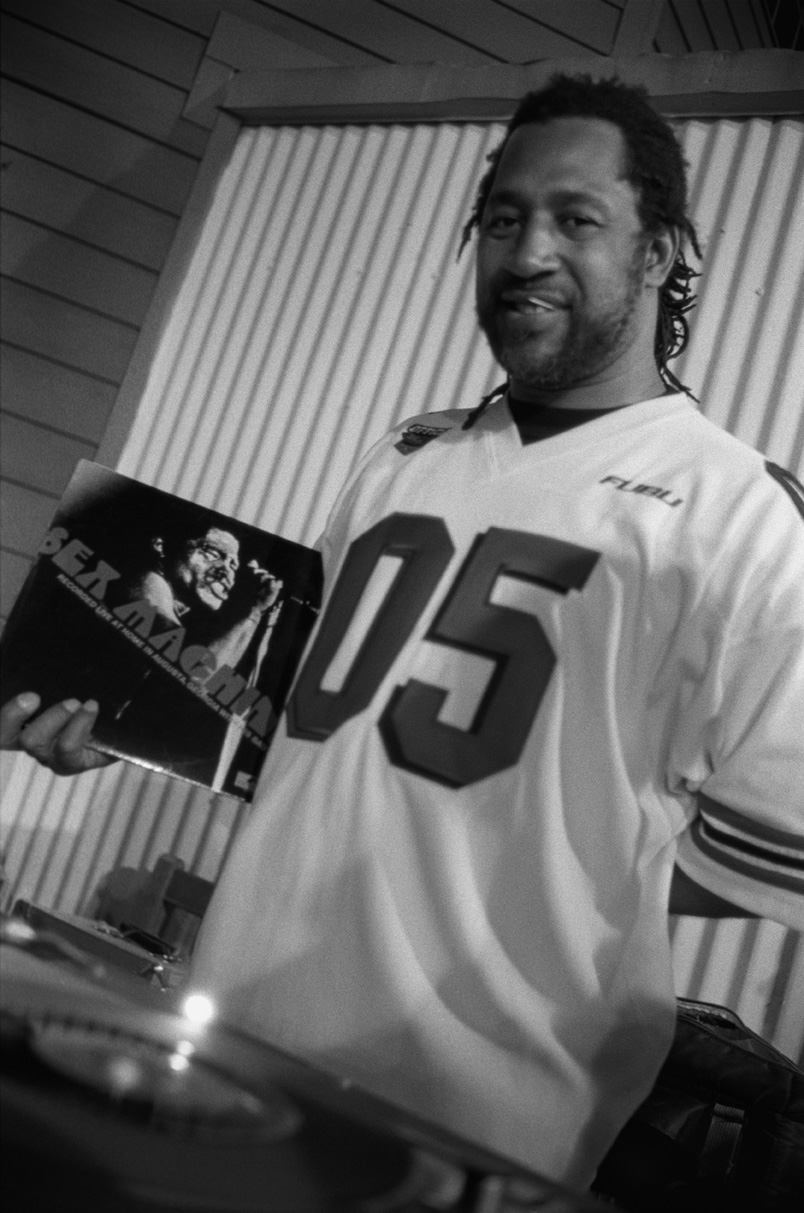
DJ Kool Herc in 1999

The Bronx has had a long association with music. In the early 20th century, it was a center for the evolution of Latin jazz. The Bronx Opera was established in 1967.

In the 1970s, the Bronx was strongly associated with the development of hip-hop, which evolved during a decade of demographic and economic decline for the borough. One of the genre's pioneers, DJ Kool Herc, held parties in the community room of an apartment building at 1520 Sedgwick Avenue, where he experimented with turntablist techniques such as mixing and scratching of funk records, as well as rapping during extended instrumentals. Other significant Bronx DJs from this period include Grandmaster Flash and Afrika Bambaataa. In addition, the Bronx was an important base for drill culture, with the rise of rappers such as Kay Flock, Sha EK and many others. There is a Hip Hop Museum in the South Bronx.

=== Off-Off-Broadway ===
The Bronx is home to several Off-Off-Broadway theaters, many staging new works by immigrant playwrights from Latin America and Africa. The Pregones Theater, which produces Latin American work, opened a new 130-seat theater in 2005 on Walton Avenue in the South Bronx. Some artists from elsewhere in New York City have begun to converge on the area, and housing prices have nearly quadrupled in the area since 2002. However, rising prices directly correlate to a housing shortage across the city and the entire metro area.

=== Arts ===
The Bronx Academy of Arts and Dance, founded in 1998 by Arthur Aviles and Charles Rice-González, provides dance, theatre and art workshops, festivals and performances focusing on contemporary and modern art in relation to race, gender and sexuality. It is home to the Arthur Aviles Typical Theatre, a contemporary dance company, and the Bronx Dance Coalition. The academy was formerly in the American Bank Note Company Building before relocating to a venue on the grounds of St. Peter's Episcopal Church.

The Bronx Museum of the Arts, founded in 1971, exhibits 20th century and contemporary art through its central museum space and 11,000 square feet (1,000 m^{2}) of galleries. Many of its exhibitions are on themes of special interest to the Bronx. Its permanent collection features more than 800 works of art, primarily by artists from Africa, Asia and Latin America, including paintings, photographs, prints, drawings, and mixed media. The museum was temporarily closed in 2006 while it underwent an expansion designed by the architectural firm Arquitectonica that would double the museum's size to 33,000 square feet (3,100 m^{2}).

The Bronx has also become home to a peculiar poetic tribute in the form of the "Heinrich Heine Memorial", better known as the Lorelei Fountain. After Heine's German birthplace of Düsseldorf had rejected, allegedly for antisemitic motives, a centennial monument to the radical German-Jewish poet (1797–1856), his incensed German-American admirers, including Carl Schurz, started a movement to place one instead in Midtown Manhattan, at Fifth Avenue and 59th Street. However, this intention was thwarted by a combination of ethnic antagonism, aesthetic controversy and political struggles over the institutional control of public art. In 1899, the memorial by Ernst Gustav Herter was placed in Joyce Kilmer Park, near the Yankee Stadium. In 1999, it was moved to 161st Street and the Concourse.

=== Maritime heritage ===
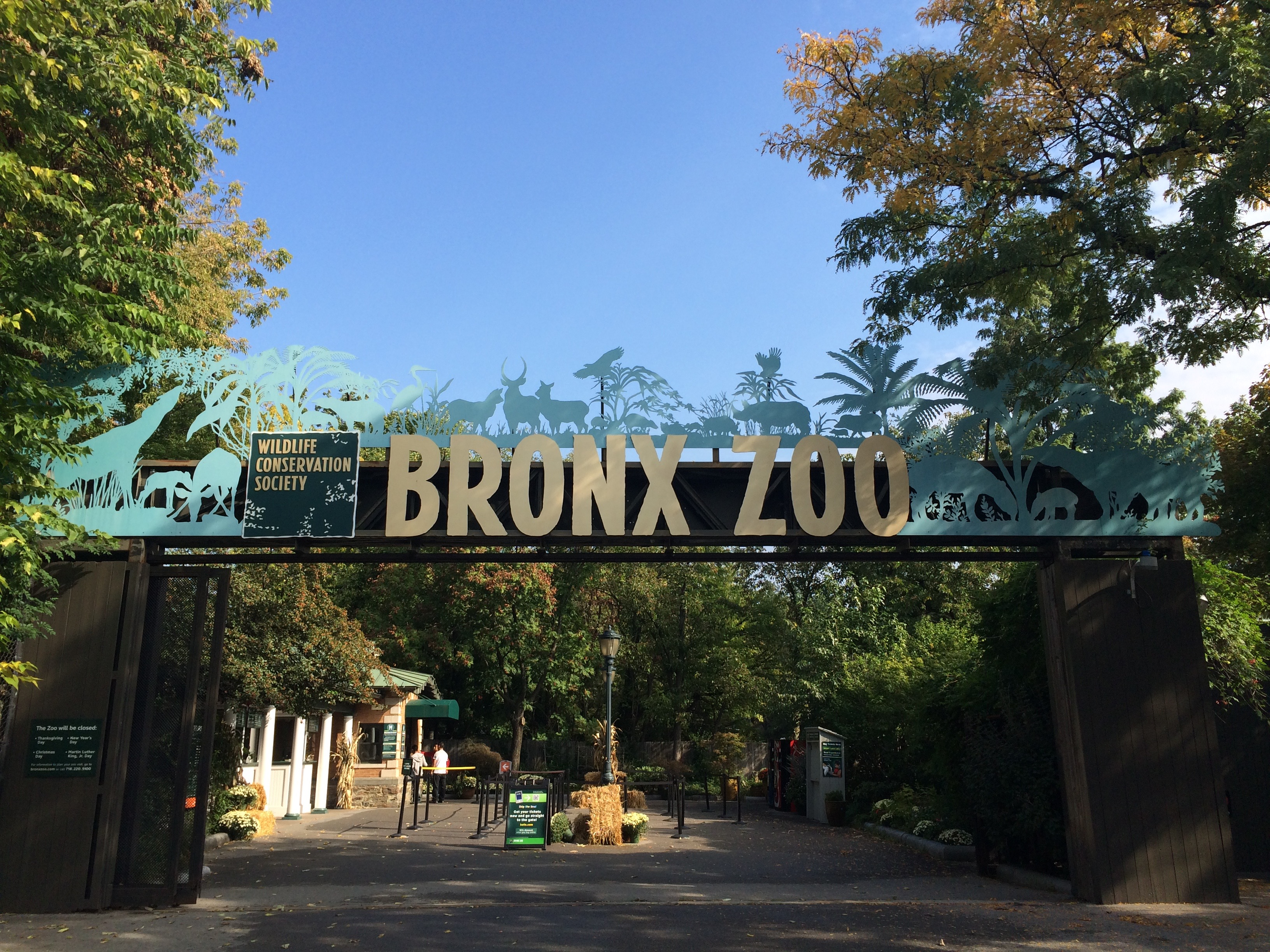
The Bronx Zoo is the largest zoo in New York City, and among the largest in the country.

The peninsular borough's maritime heritage is acknowledged in several ways. The City Island Historical Society and Nautical Museum occupies a former public school designed by the New York City school system's turn-of-the-last-century master architect C. B. J. Snyder. The state's Maritime College in Fort Schuyler (on the southeastern shore) houses the Maritime Industry Museum. In addition, the Harlem River is reemerging as "Scullers' Row" due in large part to the efforts of the Bronx River Restoration Project, a joint public-private endeavor of the city's parks department. Canoeing and kayaking on the borough's namesake river have been promoted by the Bronx River Alliance. The river is also straddled by the New York Botanical Gardens, its neighbor, the Bronx Zoo, and a little further south, on the west shore, Bronx River Art Center.

=== Community celebrations ===
"Bronx Week", traditionally held in May, began as a one-day celebration. Begun by Bronx historian Lloyd Ultan and supported by then borough president Robert Abrams, the original one-day program was based on the "Bronx Borough Day" festival which took place in the 1920s. The following year, at the height of the decade's civil unrest, the festival was extended to a one-week event. In the 1980s the key event, the "Bronx Ball", was launched. The week includes the Bronx Week Parade as well as inductions into the "Bronx Walk of Fame".

Various Bronx neighborhoods conduct their own community celebrations. The Arthur Avenue "Little Italy" neighborhood conducts an annual Autumn Ferragosto Festival that celebrates Italian culture. Hunts Point hosts an annual "Fish Parade and Summer Festival" at the start of summer. Edgewater Park hosts an annual "Ragamuffin" children's walk in November. There are several events to honor the borough's veterans. Albanian Independence Day is also observed.

There are also parades to celebrate Dominican, Italian, and Irish heritage.

=== Press and broadcasting ===
The Bronx is home to several local newspapers and radio and television studios.

==== Newspapers ====
The Bronx has several local newspapers, including The Bronx Daily, The Bronx News, Parkchester News, City News, The Norwood News, The Riverdale Press, Riverdale Review, The Bronx Times Reporter, and Co-op City Times. Four non-profit news outlets, Norwood News, Mount Hope Monitor, Mott Haven Herald and The Hunts Point Express serve the borough's poorer communities. The editor and co-publisher of The Riverdale Press, Bernard Stein, won the Pulitzer Prize for Editorial Writing for his editorials about Bronx and New York City issues in 1998. (Stein graduated from the Bronx High School of Science in 1959.)

The Bronx once had its own daily newspaper, The Bronx Home News, which started publishing on January 20, 1907, and merged into the New York Post in 1948. It became a special section of the Post, sold only in the Bronx, and eventually disappeared from view.

==== Radio and television ====
One of New York City's major non-commercial radio broadcasters is WFUV, a National Public Radio-affiliated 50,000-watt station broadcasting from Fordham University's Rose Hill campus in the Bronx. The radio station's antenna was relocated to the top of an apartment building owned by Montefiore Medical Center, which expanded the reach of the station's signal.

The City of New York has an official television station run by NYC Media and broadcasting from Bronx Community College, and Cablevision operates News 12 The Bronx, both of which feature programming based in the Bronx. Co-op City was the first area in the Bronx, and the first in New York beyond Manhattan, to have its own cable television provider. The local public-access television station BronxNet originates from Herbert H. Lehman College, the borough's only four year CUNY school, and provides government-access television (GATV) public affairs programming in addition to programming produced by Bronx residents.

== Economy ==
Shopping malls and markets in the Bronx include:

- Bay Plaza Shopping Center
- Bronx Terminal Market
- Hunts Point Cooperative Market

=== Shopping districts ===
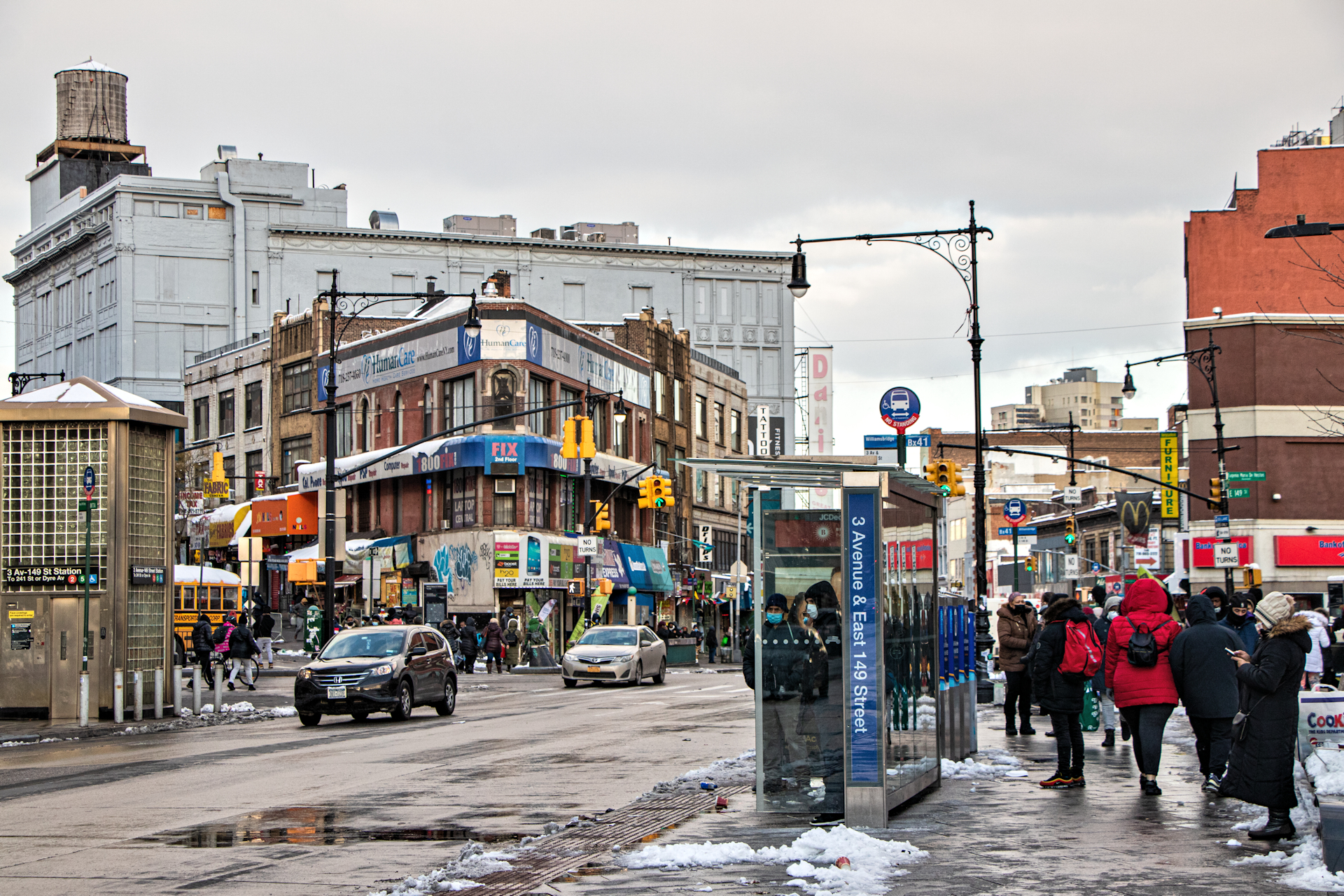
The Hub on Third Avenue

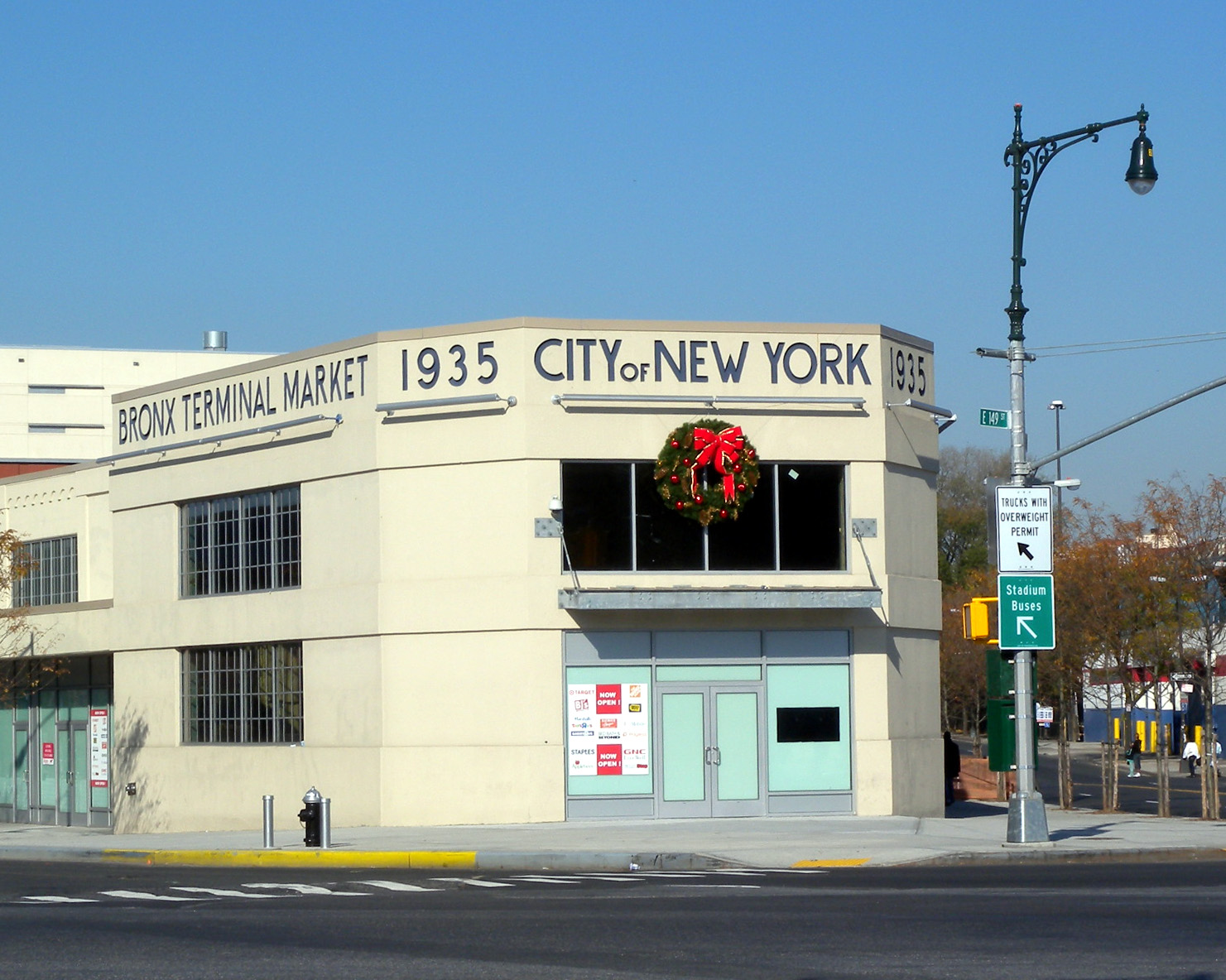
Renovated Prow Building, part of the original Bronx Terminal Market

Prominent shopping areas in the Bronx include Fordham Road, Bay Plaza in Co-op City, The Hub, the Riverdale/Kingsbridge shopping center, and Bruckner Boulevard. Shops are also concentrated on streets aligned underneath elevated railroad lines, including Westchester Avenue, White Plains Road, Jerome Avenue, Southern Boulevard, and Broadway. The Bronx Terminal Market contains several big-box stores, which opened in 2009 south of Yankee Stadium.

The Bronx has three primary shopping centers: The Hub, Gateway Center and Southern Boulevard. The Hub–Third Avenue Business Improvement District (B.I.D.), in The Hub, is the retail heart of the South Bronx, where four roads converge: East 149th Street, Willis, Melrose and Third Avenues. It is primarily inside the neighborhood of Melrose but also lines the northern border of Mott Haven. The Hub has been called "the Broadway of the Bronx", being likened to the real Broadway in Manhattan and the northwestern Bronx. It is the site of both maximum traffic and architectural density. In configuration, it resembles a miniature Times Square, a spatial "bow-tie" created by the geometry of the street. The Hub is part of Bronx Community Board 1.

The Bronx Terminal Market, in the West Bronx, formerly known as Gateway Center, is a shopping center that encompasses less than one million square feet of retail space, built on a 17 acres (7 ha) site that formerly held a wholesale fruit and vegetable market also named Bronx Terminal Market as well as the former Bronx House of Detention, south of Yankee Stadium. The $500 million shopping center, which was completed in 2009, saw the construction of new buildings and two smaller buildings, one new and the other a renovation of an existing building that was part of the original market. The two main buildings are linked by a six-level garage for 2,600 cars. The center's design has earned it a LEED "Silver" designation.

== Government and politics ==
=== Local government ===
Since New York City's consolidation in 1898, the New York City Charter that provides for a "strong" mayor–council system has governed the Bronx. The centralized New York City government is responsible for public education, correctional institutions, libraries, public safety, recreational facilities, sanitation, water supply, and welfare services in the Bronx.

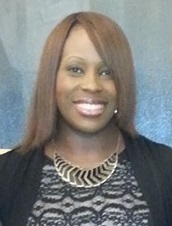
Bronx borough president Vanessa Gibson

The office of Borough President was created in the consolidation of 1898 to balance centralization with local authority. Each borough president had a powerful administrative role derived from having a vote on the New York City Board of Estimate, which was responsible for creating and approving the city's budget and proposals for land use. In 1989 the Supreme Court of the United States declared the Board of Estimate unconstitutional on the grounds that Brooklyn, the most populous borough, had no greater effective representation on the Board than Staten Island, the least populous borough, a violation of the Fourteenth Amendment's Equal Protection Clause pursuant to the high court's 1964 "one man, one vote" decision.

Borough Presidents of the Bronx
Name	Party	Term †
Louis F. Haffen	Democratic	1898 – Aug. 1909
John F. Murray	Democratic	Aug. 1909–1910
Cyrus C. Miller	Democratic	1910–1914
Douglas Mathewson	Republican- Fusion	1914–1918
Henry Bruckner	Democratic	1918–1934
James J. Lyons	Democratic	1934–1962
Joseph F. Periconi	Republican- Liberal	1962–1966
Herman Badillo	Democratic	1966–1970
Robert Abrams	Democratic	1970–1979
Stanley Simon	Democratic	1979 – April 1987
Fernando Ferrer	Democratic	April 1987 – 2002
Adolfo Carrión, Jr.	Democratic	2002 – March 2009
Rubén Díaz, Jr.	Democratic	May 2009 – 2021
Vanessa Gibson	Democratic	2022 –
† Terms begin and end in January where the month is not specified.

Since 1990, the Borough President has acted as an advocate for the borough at the mayoral agencies, the City Council, the New York state government, and corporations.

Until March 1, 2009, the Borough President of the Bronx was Adolfo Carrión Jr., elected as a Democrat in 2001 and 2005 before retiring early to direct the White House Office of Urban Affairs Policy. His successor, Democratic New York State Assembly member Rubén Díaz, Jr. — after winning a special election on April 21, 2009, by a vote of 86.3% (29,420) on the "Bronx Unity" line to 13.3% (4,646) for the Republican district leader Anthony Ribustello on the "People First" line, — became Borough President on May 1, 2009. In 2021, Rubén Díaz's Democratic successor, Vanessa Gibson was elected (began serving in 2022) with 79.9% of the vote against 13.4% for Janell King (Republican) and 6.5% for Sammy Ravelo (Conservative).

All of the Bronx's currently elected public officials have first won the nomination of the Democratic Party (in addition to any other endorsements). Local party platforms center on affordable housing, education and economic development. Controversial political issues in the Bronx include environmental issues, the cost of housing, and annexation of parkland for new Yankee Stadium.

Since its separation from New York County on January 1, 1914, the Bronx, has had, like each of the other 61 counties of New York State, its own criminal court system and District Attorney, the chief public prosecutor who is directly elected by popular vote. Darcel D. Clark has been the Bronx County District Attorney since 2016. Her predecessor was Robert T. Johnson, the District Attorney from 1989 to 2015. He was the first African-American District Attorney in New York State.

The Bronx also has twelve Community Boards, appointed bodies that advise on land use and municipal facilities and services for local residents, businesses and institutions.

=== Presidential elections ===
United States presidential election results for Bronx County, New York
Year	Republican		Democratic		Third party(ies)	
Year	No.	%	No.	%	No.	%
1916	40,938	42.55%	47,870	49.76%	7,396	7.69%
1920	106,050	56.61%	45,741	24.42%	35,538	18.97%
1924	79,583	36.73%	72,840	33.62%	64,234	29.65%
1928	98,636	28.68%	232,766	67.67%	12,545	3.65%
1932	76,587	19.15%	281,330	70.35%	42,002	10.50%
1936	93,151	17.61%	419,625	79.35%	16,042	3.03%
1940	198,293	31.77%	418,931	67.11%	6,980	1.12%
1944	211,158	31.75%	450,525	67.74%	3,352	0.50%
1948	173,044	27.80%	337,129	54.17%	112,182	18.03%
1952	241,898	37.34%	392,477	60.59%	13,420	2.07%
1956	257,382	42.81%	343,823	57.19%	0	0.00%
1960	182,393	31.76%	389,818	67.88%	2,071	0.36%
1964	135,780	25.16%	403,014	74.69%	800	0.15%
1968	142,314	32.02%	277,385	62.40%	24,818	5.58%
1972	196,754	44.60%	243,345	55.16%	1,075	0.24%
1976	96,842	28.70%	238,786	70.77%	1,763	0.52%
1980	86,843	30.70%	181,090	64.02%	14,914	5.27%
1984	109,308	32.76%	223,112	66.86%	1,263	0.38%
1988	76,043	25.51%	218,245	73.22%	3,793	1.27%
1992	63,310	20.73%	225,038	73.67%	17,112	5.60%
1996	30,435	10.52%	248,276	85.80%	10,639	3.68%
2000	36,245	11.77%	265,801	86.28%	6,017	1.95%
2004	56,701	16.53%	283,994	82.80%	2,284	0.67%
2008	41,683	10.93%	338,261	88.71%	1,378	0.36%
2012	29,967	8.08%	339,211	91.45%	1,760	0.47%
2016	37,797	9.46%	353,646	88.52%	8,079	2.02%
2020	67,740	15.88%	355,374	83.29%	3,579	0.84%
2024	98,174	26.97%	261,670	71.88%	4,217	1.16%

After becoming a separate county in 1914, the Bronx has supported only two Republican presidential candidates. It voted heavily for the winning Republican Warren G. Harding in 1920, but much more narrowly on a split vote for his victorious Republican successor Calvin Coolidge in 1924 (Coolidge 79,562; John W. Davis, Dem., 72,834; Robert La Follette, 62,202 equally divided between the Progressive and Socialist lines).

Since then, the Bronx has always supported the Democratic Party's nominee for president, starting with a vote of 2–1 for the unsuccessful Al Smith in 1928, followed by four 2–1 votes for the successful Franklin D. Roosevelt. (Both had been Governors of New York, but Republican former Gov. Thomas E. Dewey won only 28% of the Bronx's vote in 1948 against 55% for Pres. Harry Truman, the winning Democrat, and 17% for Henry A. Wallace of the Progressives. It was only 32 years earlier, by contrast, that another Republican former Governor who narrowly lost the Presidency, Charles Evans Hughes, had won 42.6% of the Bronx's 1916 vote against Democratic President Woodrow Wilson's 49.8% and Socialist candidate Allan Benson's 7.3%.) Donald Trump improved on the Republican Party's performance from a historic low of 8% in 2012 to 27% in 2024 over the course of his three runs for president, the highest for Republicans since 1984.

=== Congressional representation ===
As of 2025, four Democrats represented the Bronx in the United States House of Representatives:

- Adriano Espaillat (first elected in 2016) represents New York's 13th congressional district, which includes the Bronx neighborhoods of Bedford Park, Jerome Park, Kingsbridge Heights, Norwood, and parts of Fordham, Kingsbridge, Morris Heights, and University Heights, as well as a portion of Manhattan.
- Alexandria Ocasio-Cortez (first elected in 2018) represents New York's 14th congressional district, which includes the neighborhoods of City Island, Country Club, Van Nest, Morris Park, Parkchester, Pelham Bay, Schuylerville, and Throggs Neck, as well as a portion of Queens.
- Ritchie Torres (first elected in 2020) represents New York's 15th congressional district, which includes West Bronx and South Bronx.
- George Latimer (first elected in 2024) represents New York's 16th congressional district, which includes the neighborhood of Wakefield, as well as the southern half of Westchester County.

=== Mayoral elections ===
The Bronx has often shown striking differences from other boroughs in elections for Mayor. The only Republican to carry the Bronx since 1914 was Fiorello La Guardia in 1933, 1937, and 1941 (and in the latter two elections, only because his 30% to 32% vote on the American Labor Party line was added to 22% to 23% as a Republican). The Bronx was thus the only borough not carried by the successful Republican re-election campaigns of Mayors Rudy Giuliani in 1997 and Michael Bloomberg in 2005.

The anti-war Socialist campaign of Morris Hillquit in the 1917 mayoral election won over 31% of the Bronx's vote, putting him second and well ahead of the 20% won by the incumbent pro-war Fusion Mayor John Purroy Mitchel, who came in second (ahead of Hillquit) everywhere else and outpolled Hillquit citywide by 23.2% to 21.7%. In every subsequent election through 1933, the Bronx gave the Socialist Party candidate a higher percent of the vote than any other borough.

== Education ==
Education in the Bronx is provided by a large number of public and private institutions, many of which draw students who live beyond the Bronx. The New York City Department of Education manages the borough's public noncharter schools. According to the 2020–2024 American Community Survey, public schools enrolled an estimated 247,100 of the roughly 277,100 Bronx residents aged three and over enrolled in pre-college schools. There are also several public charter schools. Private schools range from elite independent schools to religiously affiliated schools run by the Roman Catholic Archdiocese of New York and Jewish organizations.

A small portion of land between Pelham and Pelham Bay Park, with 35 houses, is a part of the Bronx, but is cut off from the rest of the borough due to the county boundaries; the New York City government pays for the residents' children to go to Pelham Union Free School District schools, including Pelham Memorial High School, since that is more cost effective than sending school buses to take the students to New York City schools. This arrangement has been in place since 1948.

=== Educational attainment ===
According to the 2020–2024 American Community Survey, of the roughly 930,600 Bronx residents aged 25 and over, an estimated 75.4% had graduated from high school and 22.4% held a bachelor's degree or higher, up from 62.3% and 14.6% in 2000. These were the lowest rates among New York City's five boroughs, which ranged from 82.6% (Queens) to 89.5% (Manhattan) for high school graduates, and from 35.7% (Staten Island) to 64.2% (Manhattan) for those with a bachelor's degree or higher. The corresponding figures were 88.0% and 40.2% for New York State, and 89.6% and 35.7% for the United States.

=== High schools ===
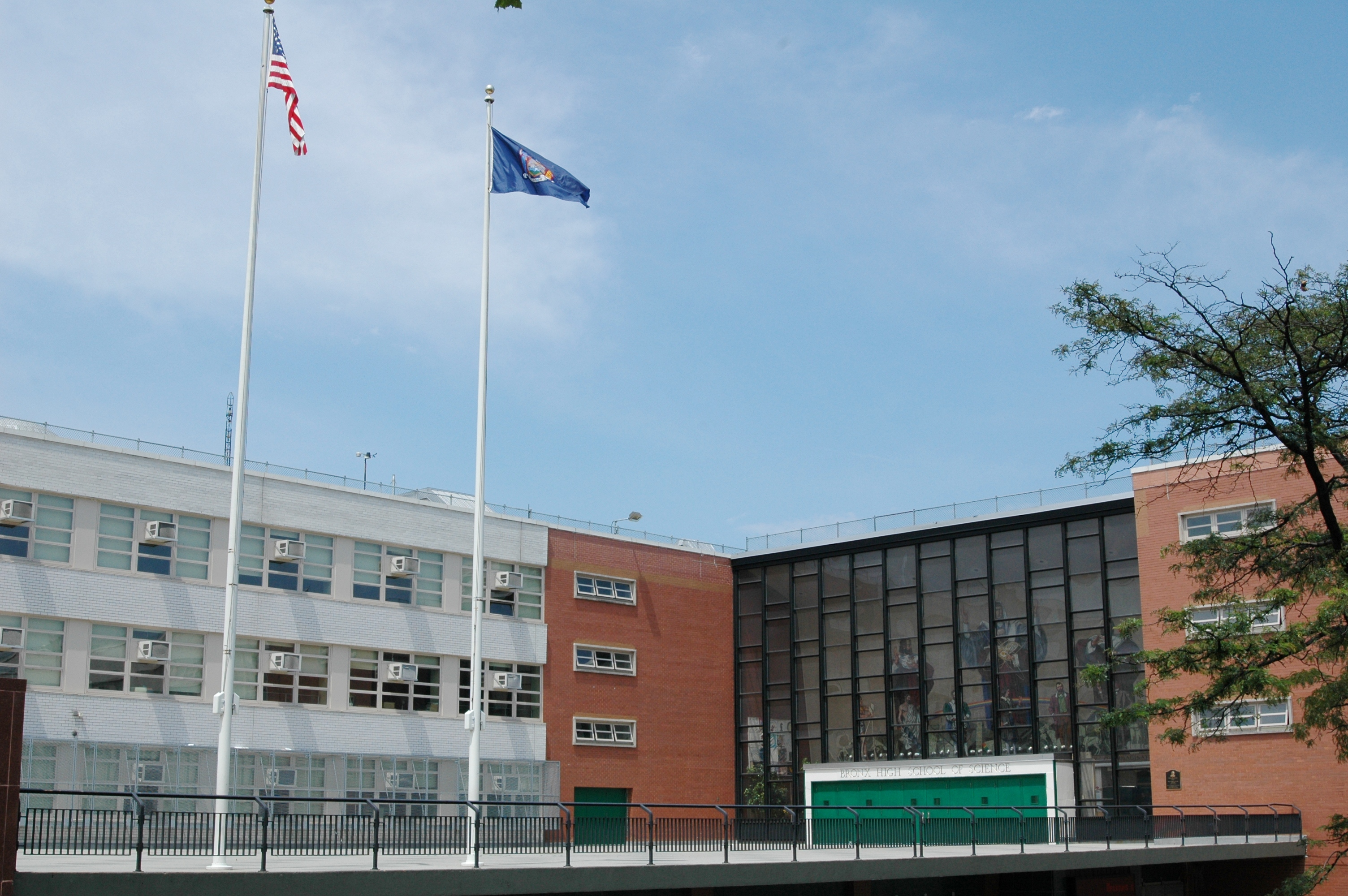
The Bronx High School of Science

According to the 2020–2024 American Community Survey, an estimated 68,073 (87.5%) of the roughly 77,800 Bronx residents enrolled in high school attended public schools.

Many public high schools are in the borough including the elite Bronx High School of Science, Celia Cruz Bronx High School of Music, DeWitt Clinton High School, High School for Violin and Dance, Bronx Leadership Academy 2, Bronx International High School, the School for Excellence, the Morris Academy for Collaborative Study, Wings Academy for young adults, The Bronx School for Law, Government and Justice, Validus Preparatory Academy, The Eagle Academy For Young Men, Bronx Expeditionary Learning High School, Bronx Academy of Letters, Herbert H. Lehman High School and High School of American Studies. The Bronx is also home to three of New York City's most prestigious private, secular schools: Fieldston, Horace Mann, and Riverdale Country School.

High schools linked to the Catholic Church include: St. Raymond Academy for Girls, All Hallows High School, Fordham Preparatory School, Monsignor Scanlan High School, St. Raymond High School for Boys, Cardinal Hayes High School, Cardinal Spellman High School, The Academy of Mount Saint Ursula, Aquinas High School, Preston High School, St. Catharine Academy, Mount Saint Michael Academy, and St. Barnabas High School.

The SAR Academy and SAR High School are Modern Orthodox Jewish Yeshiva coeducational day schools in Riverdale, with roots in Manhattan's Lower East Side.

In the 1990s, New York City began closing the large, public high schools in the Bronx and replacing them with small high schools. Among the reasons cited for the changes were poor graduation rates and concerns about safety. Schools that have been closed or reduced in size include John F. Kennedy, James Monroe, Taft, Theodore Roosevelt, Adlai Stevenson, Evander Childs, Christopher Columbus, Morris, Walton, and South Bronx High Schools.

=== Colleges and universities ===
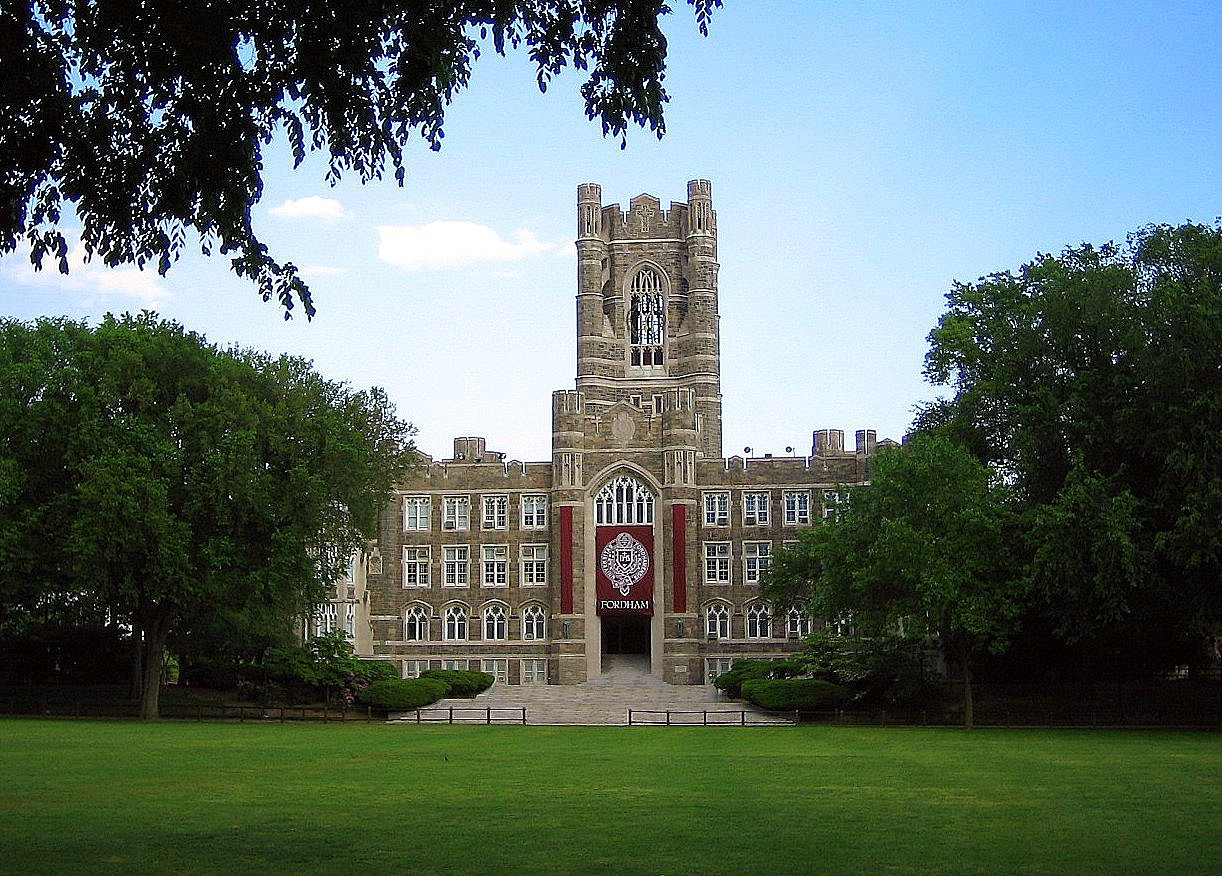
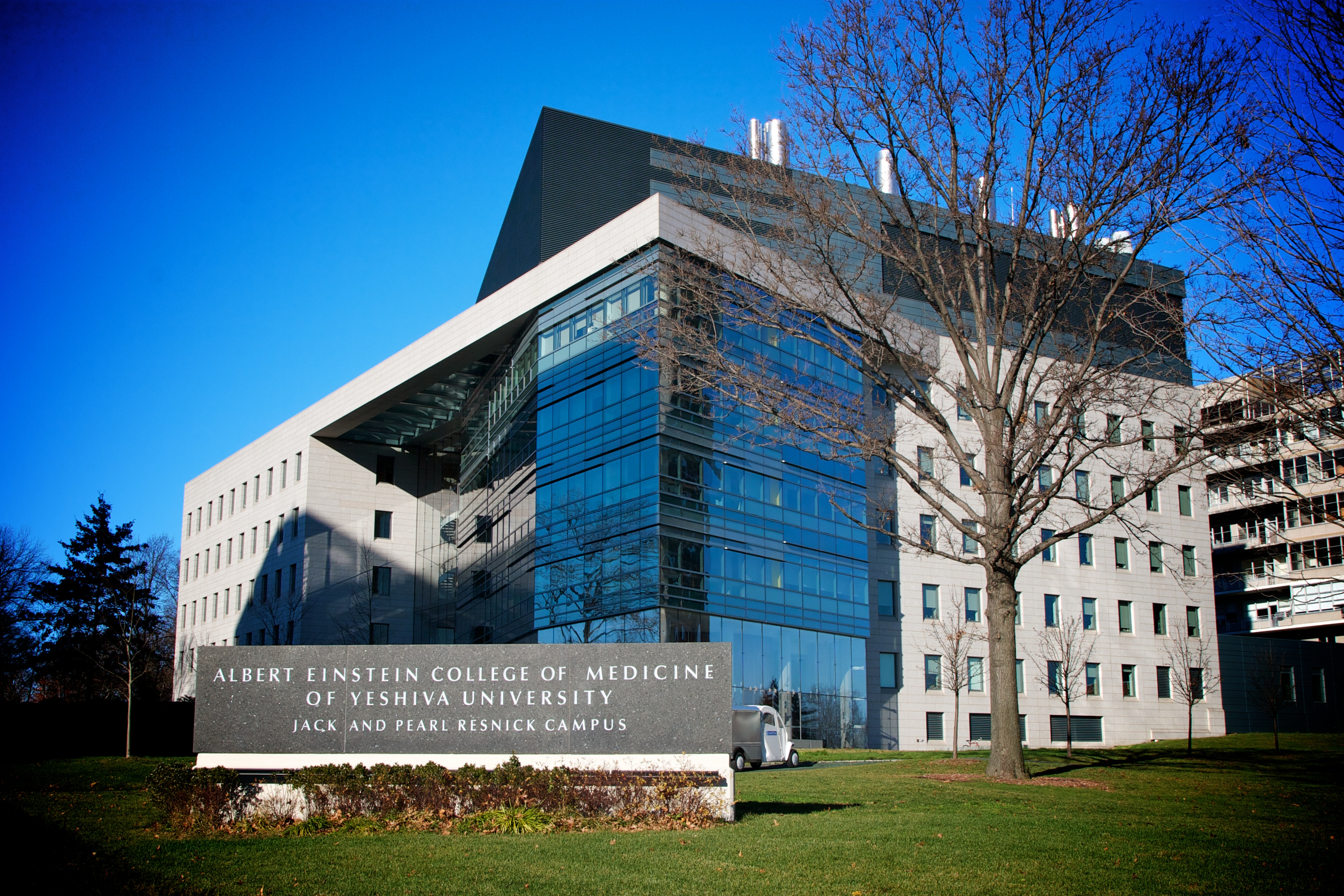
The Bronx hosts Fordham University and the Albert Einstein College of Medicine, among others.

According to the 2020–2024 American Community Survey, an estimated 67,100 (66.5%) of the roughly 101,000 Bronx residents seeking college, graduate or professional degrees attended public institutions, up from 57.5% in 2000. Several colleges and universities are in the Bronx.

Fordham University was founded as St. John's College in 1841 by the Diocese of New York as the first Catholic institution of higher education in the northeast. It is now officially an independent institution, but strongly embraces its Jesuit heritage. The 85-acre (340,000 m^{2}) Bronx campus, known as Rose Hill, is the main campus of the university, and is among the largest within the city (other Fordham campuses are in Manhattan and Westchester County).

Three campuses of the City University of New York are in the Bronx: Hostos Community College, Bronx Community College (occupying the former University Heights Campus of New York University) and Herbert H. Lehman College (formerly the uptown campus of Hunter College), which offers both undergraduate and graduate degrees.

The College of Mount Saint Vincent is a Catholic liberal arts college in Riverdale under the direction of the Sisters of Charity of New York. Founded in 1847 as a school for girls, the academy became a degree-granting college in 1911 and began admitting men in 1974. The school serves 1,600 students. Its campus is also home to the Academy for Jewish Religion, a transdenominational rabbinical and cantorial school.

Manhattan University is a Catholic college in Riverdale which offers undergraduate programs in the arts, business, education, engineering, and science. It also offers graduate programs in education and engineering.

Albert Einstein College of Medicine, part of the Montefiore Medical Center, is in Morris Park.

The coeducational and non-sectarian Mercy University—with its main campus in Dobbs Ferry—has a Bronx campus near Westchester Square.

The State University of New York Maritime College in Fort Schuyler (Throggs Neck)—at the far southeastern tip of the Bronx—is the national leader in maritime education and houses the Maritime Industry Museum. (Directly across Long Island Sound is Kings Point, Long Island, home of the United States Merchant Marine Academy and the American Merchant Marine Museum.) As of 2017, graduates from the university earned an average annual salary of $144,000, the highest of any university graduates in the United States.

In addition, the private, proprietary Monroe University, focused on preparation for business and the professions, started in the Bronx in 1933 and now has a campus in New Rochelle (Westchester County) as well the Bronx's Fordham neighborhood.

== Transportation ==
=== Roads and streets ===
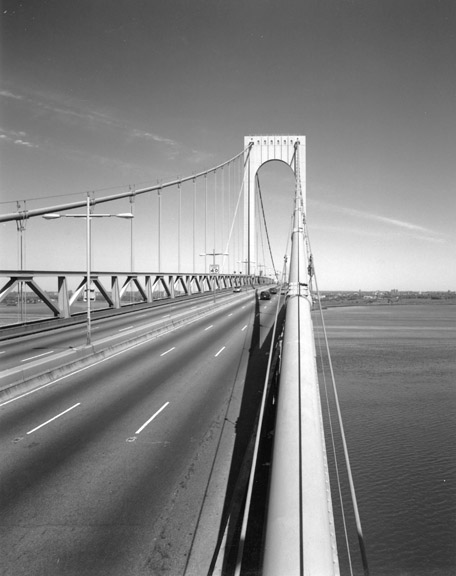
Bronx–Whitestone Bridge

==== Surface streets ====
The Bronx street grid is irregular. Like the northernmost part of upper Manhattan, the West Bronx's hilly terrain leaves a relatively free-style street grid. Much of the West Bronx's street numbering carries over from upper Manhattan, but does not match it exactly; East 132nd Street is the lowest numbered street in the Bronx. This dates from the mid-19th century when the southwestern area of Westchester County west of the Bronx River, was incorporated into New York City and known as the Northside.

The East Bronx is considerably flatter, and the street layout tends to be more regular. Only the Wakefield neighborhood picks up the street numbering, albeit at a misalignment due to Tremont Avenue's layout. At the same diagonal latitude, West 262nd Street in Riverdale matches East 237th Street in Wakefield.

Three major north–south thoroughfares run between Manhattan and the Bronx: Third Avenue, Park Avenue, and Broadway. Other major north–south roads include the Grand Concourse, Jerome Avenue, Sedgwick Avenue, Webster Avenue, and White Plains Road. Major east-west thoroughfares include Mosholu Parkway, Gun Hill Road, Fordham Road, Pelham Parkway, and Tremont Avenue.

Most east–west streets are prefixed with either East or West, to indicate on which side of Jerome Avenue they lie (continuing the similar system in Manhattan, which uses Fifth Avenue as the dividing line).

The historic Boston Post Road, part of the long pre-revolutionary road connecting Boston with other northeastern cities, runs east–west in some places, and sometimes northeast–southwest.

Mosholu and Pelham Parkways, with Bronx Park between them, Van Cortlandt Park to the west and Pelham Bay Park to the east, are also linked by bridle paths.

As of the 2000 Census, approximately 61.6% of all Bronx households do not have access to a car. Citywide, the percentage of autoless households is 55%.

==== Highways ====
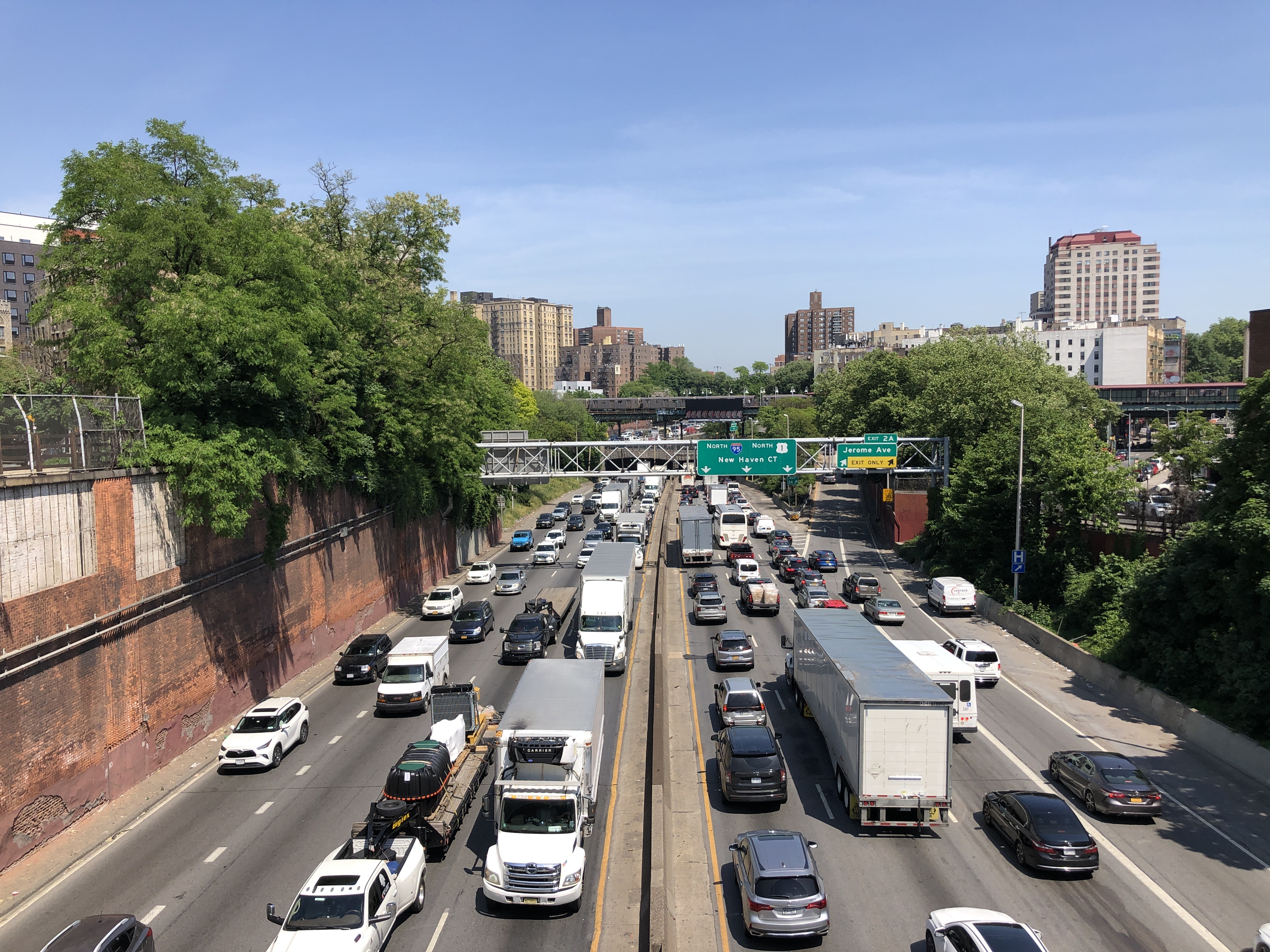
The Cross Bronx Expressway (I-95/US 1) is typically clogged with traffic

Several major limited access highways traverse the Bronx. These include:

- the Bronx River Parkway
- the Bruckner Expressway (I-278/I-95)
- the Cross Bronx Expressway (I-95/I-295)
- the New England Thruway (I-95)
- the Henry Hudson Parkway (NY-9A)
- the Hutchinson River Parkway
- the Major Deegan Expressway (I-87)

==== Bridges and tunnels ====
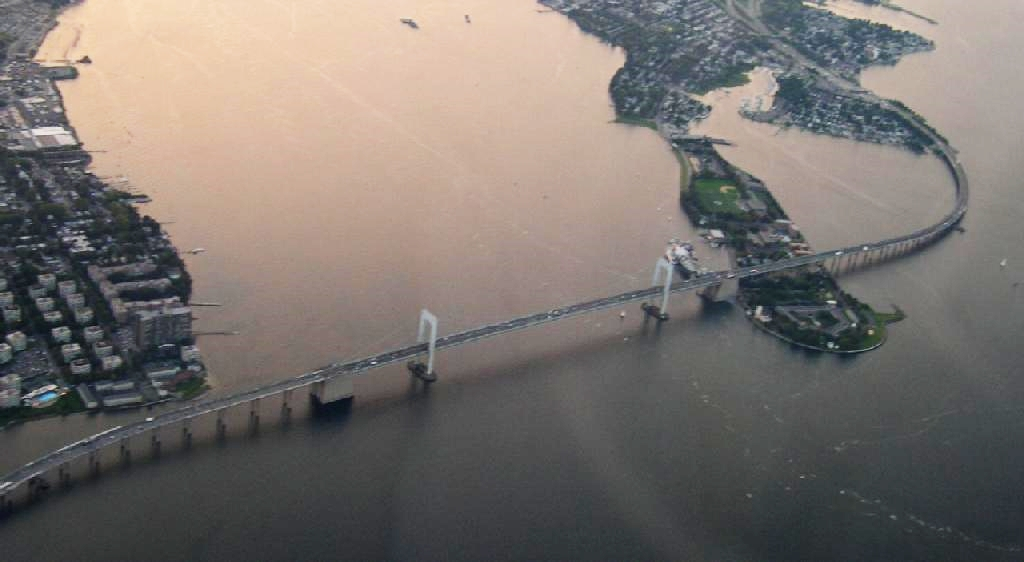
An aerial view of the Throgs Neck Bridge

Thirteen bridges and three tunnels connect the Bronx to Manhattan, and three bridges connect the Bronx to Queens. These are, from west to east:

To Manhattan: the Spuyten Duyvil Bridge, the Henry Hudson Bridge, the Broadway Bridge, the University Heights Bridge, the Washington Bridge, the Alexander Hamilton Bridge, the High Bridge, the Concourse Tunnel, the Macombs Dam Bridge, the 145th Street Bridge, the 149th Street Tunnel, the Madison Avenue Bridge, the Park Avenue Bridge, the Lexington Avenue Tunnel, the Third Avenue Bridge (southbound traffic only), and the Willis Avenue Bridge (northbound traffic only).

To both Manhattan and Queens: the Robert F. Kennedy Bridge, formerly known as the Triborough Bridge.

To Queens: the Bronx–Whitestone Bridge and the Throgs Neck Bridge.

=== Mass transit ===
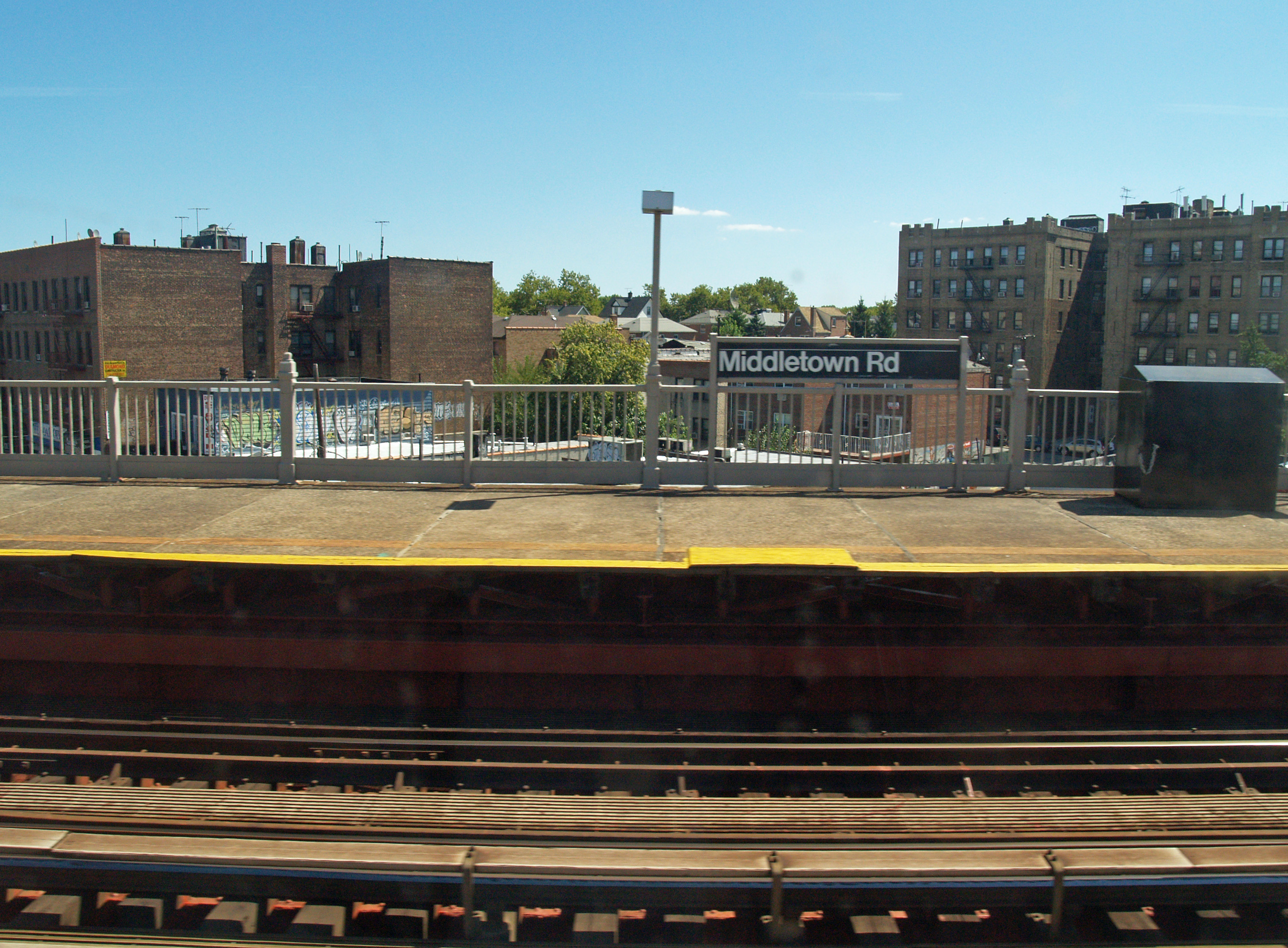
Middletown Road subway station on the 6 and <6> trains

The Bronx is served by seven New York City Subway services along six physical lines, with 70 stations in the Bronx:

- IND Concourse Line (B and D trains)
- IRT Broadway–Seventh Avenue Line (1 train)
- IRT Dyre Avenue Line (5 train)
- IRT Jerome Avenue Line (4 train)
- IRT Pelham Line (6 and <6> trains)
- IRT White Plains Road Line (2 and 5 trains)

There are also many MTA Regional Bus Operations bus routes in the Bronx. This includes local and express routes as well as Bee-Line Bus System routes.

Two Metro-North Railroad commuter rail lines (the Harlem Line and the Hudson Line) serve 11 stations in the Bronx. (Marble Hill, between the Spuyten Duyvil and University Heights stations, is actually in the only part of Manhattan connected to the mainland.) In addition, some trains serving the New Haven Line stop at Fordham Plaza. As part of Penn Station Access, the 2018 MTA budget funded construction of four new stops along the New Haven Line to serve Hunts Point, Parkchester, Morris Park, and Co-op City.

In 2018, NYC Ferry's Soundview line opened, connecting the Soundview landing in Clason Point Park to three East River locations in Manhattan. On December 28, 2021; the Throgs Neck Ferry landing at Ferry Point Park in Throgs Neck was opened providing an additional stop on the Soundview line. The ferry is operated by Hornblower Cruises.

== Climate ==
Climate data for The Bronx
Month	Jan	Feb	Mar	Apr	May	Jun	Jul	Aug	Sep	Oct	Nov	Dec	Year
Mean daily maximum °F (°C)	39.7 (4.3)	42.6 (5.9)	50.3 (10.2)	61.4 (16.3)	72.3 (22.4)	80.9 (27.2)	86.1 (30.1)	84.1 (28.9)	77.1 (25.1)	65.8 (18.8)	54.1 (12.3)	44.8 (7.1)	63.3 (17.4)
Mean daily minimum °F (°C)	27.3 (−2.6)	28.7 (−1.8)	34.6 (1.4)	44.4 (6.9)	54.6 (12.6)	64.3 (17.9)	70.6 (21.4)	69.1 (20.6)	62.1 (16.7)	50.7 (10.4)	41.3 (5.2)	33.1 (0.6)	48.4 (9.1)
Average precipitation inches (mm)	3.74 (95)	3.19 (81)	4.37 (111)	3.95 (100)	4.06 (103)	4.55 (116)	4.37 (111)	4.82 (122)	4.55 (116)	4.13 (105)	3.45 (88)	4.67 (119)	49.85 (1,266)
Average snowfall inches (cm)	8.4 (21)	8.9 (23)	4.3 (11)	0.5 (1.3)	0 (0)	0 (0)	0 (0)	0 (0)	0 (0)	0 (0)	0.4 (1.0)	4.1 (10)	26.6 (68)
Source: NOAA

== In popular culture ==
=== Film and television ===
==== Mid-20th century ====
Mid-20th century movies set in the Bronx portrayed densely settled, working-class, urban culture. From This Day Forward (1946), set in Highbridge, occasionally delved into Bronx life. The most notable examinations of working class Bronx life were Paddy Chayefsky's Academy Award-winning Marty and his 1956 film The Catered Affair. Other films that portrayed life in the Bronx are: the 1993 Robert De Niro/Chazz Palminteri film, A Bronx Tale, Spike Lee's 1999 movie Summer of Sam, which focused on an Italian-American Bronx community in the 1970s, 1994's I Like It Like That which takes place in the predominantly Puerto Rican neighborhood of the South Bronx, and Doughboys, the story of two Italian-American brothers in danger of losing their bakery thanks to one brother's gambling debts.

The Bronx's gritty urban life had worked its way into the movies even earlier, with depictions of the "Bronx cheer", a loud flatulent-like sound of disapproval, allegedly first made by New York Yankees fans. The sound can be heard, for example, on the Spike Jones and His City Slickers recording of "Der Fuehrer's Face" (from the 1942 Disney animated film of the same name), repeatedly lambasting Adolf Hitler with: "We'll Heil! (Bronx cheer) Heil! (Bronx cheer) Right in Der Fuehrer's Face!"

==== Symbolism ====
Starting in the 1970s, the Bronx often symbolized violence, decay, and urban ruin. The wave of arson in the South Bronx in the 1960s and 1970s inspired the observation that "The Bronx is burning": in 1974 it was the title of both an editorial in The New York Times and a BBC documentary film. The line entered the pop-consciousness with Game Two of the 1977 World Series, when a fire broke out near Yankee Stadium as the team was playing the Los Angeles Dodgers. As the fire was captured on live television, announcer Howard Cosell is wrongly remembered to have said something like, "There it is, ladies and gentlemen: the Bronx is burning". Historians of New York City often point to Cosell's remark as an acknowledgement of both the city and the borough's decline. A feature-length documentary film by Edwin Pagán called Bronx Burning chronicled what led up to the many arson-for-insurance fraud fires of the 1970s in the borough.

Bronx gang life was depicted in the 1974 novel The Wanderers by Bronx native Richard Price and the 1979 movie of the same name. They are set in the heart of the Bronx, showing apartment life and the then-landmark Krums ice cream parlor. In the 1979 film The Warriors, the eponymous gang go to a meeting in Van Cortlandt Park in the Bronx, and have to fight their way out of the borough and get back to Coney Island in Brooklyn. The 2005 video game adaptation features levels called Pelham, Tremont, and "Gunhill" (a play off the name Gun Hill Road). A Bronx Tale (1993) depicts gang activities in the Belmont "Little Italy" section of the Bronx. This theme lends itself to the title of The Bronx Is Burning, an eight-part ESPN TV mini-series (2007) about the New York Yankees' drive to winning baseball's 1977 World Series. The TV series emphasizes the team's boisterous nature, led by manager Billy Martin, catcher Thurman Munson and outfielder Reggie Jackson, as well as the malaise of the Bronx and New York City in general during that time, such as the blackout, the city's serious financial woes and near bankruptcy, the arson for insurance payments, and the election of Ed Koch as mayor.

The 1981 film Fort Apache, The Bronx is another film that used the Bronx's gritty image for its storyline. The movie's title is from the nickname for the 41st Police Precinct in the South Bronx which was nicknamed "Fort Apache". Also from 1981 is the horror film Wolfen making use of the rubble of the Bronx as a home for werewolf type creatures. Knights of the South Bronx, a true story of a teacher who worked with disadvantaged children, is another film also set in the Bronx released in 2005. The Bronx was the setting for the 1983 film Fuga dal Bronx, also known as Bronx Warriors 2 and Escape 2000, an Italian B-movie best known for its appearance on the television series Mystery Science Theater 3000. The plot revolves around a sinister construction corporation's plans to depopulate, destroy and redevelop the Bronx, and a band of rebels who are out to expose the corporation's murderous ways and save their homes. The film is memorable for its almost incessant use of the phrase, "Leave the Bronx!" Many of the movie's scenes were filmed in Queens, substituting as the Bronx. Rumble in the Bronx, filmed in Vancouver, was a 1995 Jackie Chan kung-fu film, another which popularized the Bronx to international audiences. Last Bronx, a 1996 Sega game played on the bad reputation of the Bronx to lend its name to an alternate version of post-Japanese bubble Tokyo, where crime and gang warfare is rampant. The 2016 Netflix series The Get Down is based on the development of hip-hop in 1977 in the South Bronx. In recent years the Bronx has came to symbolize revival and is roaring back nowadays and the Bronx has recorded its lowest crime rates in most of recorded history

=== Literature ===
==== Books ====
The Bronx has been featured significantly in fiction literature. All of the characters in Herman Wouk's City Boy: The Adventures of Herbie Bookbinder (1948) live in the Bronx, and about half of the action is set there. Kate Simon's Bronx Primitive: Portraits of a Childhood (1982) is directly autobiographical, a warm account of a Polish-Jewish girl in an immigrant family growing up before World War II, and living near Arthur Avenue and Tremont Avenue. In Jacob M. Appel's short story, "The Grand Concourse" (2007), a woman who grew up in the iconic Lewis Morris Building returns to the Morrisania neighborhood with her adult daughter. Similarly, in Avery Corman's book The Old Neighborhood (1980), an upper-middle class white protagonist returns to his birth neighborhood (Fordham Road and the Grand Concourse), and learns that even though the folks are poor, Hispanic and African-American, they are good people.

By contrast, Tom Wolfe's Bonfire of the Vanities (1987) portrays a wealthy, white protagonist, Sherman McCoy, getting lost off the Bruckner Expressway in the South Bronx and having an altercation with locals. A substantial piece of the last part of the book is set in the resulting riotous trial at the Bronx County Courthouse. However, times change, and in 2007, The New York Times reported that "the Bronx neighborhoods near the site of Sherman's accident are now dotted with townhouses and apartments." In the same article, the Reverend Al Sharpton (whose fictional analogue in the novel is "Reverend Bacon") asserts that "twenty years later, the cynicism of The Bonfire of the Vanities is as out of style as Tom Wolfe's wardrobe."

Don DeLillo's Underworld (1997) is also set in The Bronx and offers a perspective on the area from the 1950s onward. Stan Lee was also born in The Bronx and spent his formative years there.

==== Poetry ====
In poetry, the Bronx has been immortalized by one of the world's shortest couplets:

The Bronx?
No Thonx
Ogden Nash, The New Yorker, 1931

Nash repented 33 years after his calumny, penning the following poem to the dean of faculty at Bronx Community College in 1964:

I wrote those lines, "The Bronx? No thonx";
I shudder to confess them.

Now I'm an older, wiser man
I cry, "The Bronx? God bless them!"

In 2016, W. R. Rodriguez published Bronx Trilogy—consisting of the shoe shine parlor poems et al., concrete pastures of the beautiful bronx, and from the banks of brook avenue. The trilogy celebrates Bronx people, places, and events. DeWitt Clinton High School, St. Mary's Park, and Brook Avenue are a few of the schools, parks, and streets Rodriguez uses as subjects for his poems.

Nash's couplet "The Bronx? No Thonx" and his subsequent blessing are mentioned in Bronx Accent: A Literary and Pictorial History of the Borough, edited by Lloyd Ultan and Barbara Unger and published in 2000. The book, which includes the work of Yiddish poets, offers a selection from Allen Ginsberg's Kaddish, as his Aunt Elanor and his mother, Naomi, lived near Woodlawn Cemetery. Also featured is Ruth Lisa Schecther's poem, "Bronx", which is described as a celebration of the borough's landmarks. There is a selection of works from poets such as Sandra María Esteves, Milton Kessler, Joan Murray, W. R. Rodriguez, Myra Shapiro, Gayl Teller, and Terence Wynch.

"Bronx Migrations" by Michelle M. Tokarczyk is a collection that spans five decades of Tokarczyk's life in the Bronx, from her exodus in 1962 to her return in search of her childhood tenement.

==== Bronx Memoir Project ====
Bronx Memoir Project: Vol. 1 is a published anthology by the Bronx Council on the Arts and brought forth through a series of workshops meant to empower Bronx residents and shed the stigma on the Bronx's burning past. The Bronx Memoir Project was created as an ongoing collaboration between the Bronx Council on the Arts and other cultural institutions, including the Bronx Documentary Center, the Bronx Library Center, the (Edgar Allan) Poe Park Visitor Center, Mindbuilders, and other institutions and funded through a grant from the National Endowment for the Arts. The goal was to develop and refine memoir fragments written by people of all walks of life that share a common bond residing within the Bronx.

=== Songs ===
- "Jenny from the Block" (2002) by Jennifer Lopez, from the album This is me...Then is about the South Bronx, where Lopez grew up.
- In Marc Ferris's 5-page, 15-column list of "Songs and Compositions Inspired by New York City" in The Encyclopedia of New York City (1995), only a handful refer to the Bronx; most refer to New York City proper, especially Manhattan and Brooklyn. Ferris's extensive but selective 1995 list mentions only four songs referring specifically to the Bronx: "On the Banks of the Bronx" (1919), by William LeBaron & Victor Jacobi; "Bronx Express" (1922), by Henry Creamer, Ossip Dymow & Turner Layton; "The Tremont Avenue Cruisewear Fashion Show" (1973), by Jerry Livingston & Mark David; and "I Love the New York Yankees" (1987), by Paula Lindstrom.

=== Theater ===
Clifford Odets's play Awake and Sing! is set in 1933 in the Bronx. The play, first produced at the Belasco Theater in 1935, concerns a poor family living in small quarters, the struggles of the controlling parents and the aspirations of their children.

René Marqués' The Oxcart (1959) concerns a rural Puerto Rican family who immigrate to the Bronx for a better life.

A Bronx Tale is an autobiographical one-man show written and performed by Chazz Palminteri. It is a coming-of-age story set in the Bronx. It premiered in Los Angeles in the 1980s and then played on Off-Broadway. After a film version involving Palminteri and Robert De Niro, Palminteri performed his one-man show on Broadway and on tour in 2007.

== See also ==
- Bronx Borough Hall
- Bronx court system delays
- List of counties in New York
- List of people from the Bronx
- National Register of Historic Places listings in the Bronx
- Wildlife in the Bronx
