= Timeline of the Bronx =

The following is a timeline of the history of the borough of the Bronx in New York City, New York, United States.

== Prior to the 19th century ==
- Prior to European settlement: The Indian Siwanoy tribe of the Wappinger Confederacy roamed the eastern portion of the area that became the Bronx.
- 1639 - Jonas Jonasson Bronck settles and establishes a farm (which he named Emmaus) on 500 acres in what will become known as the Bronx.
- 1642 - Summer: Anne Hutchinson and family move to a location near Split Rock.
- 1643 - August: Anne Hutchinson and others are massacred in an Indian raid during Kieft's War. Anne's daughter Susanna was the only survivor.
- 1646
  - Adriaen van der Donck gets a land grant from the Director of New Netherland Willem Kieft. van der Donck names the estate Colen Donck.
  - Thomas Cornell granted a four square mile patent which encompasses what is now Clason Point.
- 1654
  - Thomas Pell bought a large tract of land from Chief Wampage and other Siwanoy Indian tribal members under Treaty Oak.
  - Westchester Village was founded by English settlers who left New Haven Colony for Dutch New Netherland, on land purchased by Thomas Pell in 1654. The settlement was called Oostdorp, or East Towne, and called Westchester by the English settlers.
- 1655 - September 15: Farms in what is now the Bronx were attacked during the Peach War between the Munsee and New Netherlands.
- 1664 - The Province of New York, a British colony, is created by the acquisition of the Dutch colony of New Netherland as part of the treaty ending the Second Anglo-Dutch War.
- 1683 - Westchester County, is created. It contains all of the lands that would eventually become the Bronx.
- 1748 - Van Cortlandt House is built.
- 1758 - Valentine–Varian House is built.
- 1761 - Benjamin Palmer buys an island and renames it City Island.
- 1776
  - Battle of Pell's Point (Battle of Pelham) takes place in what is now Pelham Bay Park. The Bronx area becomes part of the Neutral Ground of Westchester County.
  - Two rival Loyalist military units, New Jersey Volunteers, and De Lancey's Brigade began operating in the area between Morrisania and the Croton Rivers. De Lancey's Brigade had three battalions stationed in Kingsbridge.
- 1777 - March: The Loyal American Regiment was raised and joins two other Loyalist military units that operate out of Morrisania and Kingsbridge.
- 1781 - January 22: Lieutenant Colonel William Hull led a part of the 2nd Canadian Regiment in raiding De Lancey's Brigade in Morrisania. The 2nd Canadian Regiment burned the enemy's barracks, captured 52 prisoners, and took large supplies of ammunition and forage.

== 19th century ==
=== 1800s-1880s ===
- 1833 - Fort Schuyler is constructed.
- 1840 - St. Ann's Episcopal Church (Bronx), is constructed.
- 1841 - Fordham University established as St. John's College.
- 1844 - Grace Church, an Episcopal church in West Farms, Bronx was incorporated. The founding rector of the church was Washington Rodman.
- 1846 - Town of West Farms was created from the town of Westchester, New York
- 1848 - Gouverneur Morris Jr. sells 200 acres to create Morrisania Village.
- 1852 - July 28: The steamboat Henry Clay, travelling from Albany, catches fire on the Hudson river. The crew beached the steamboat in Riverdale where it continued to burn down. Forty-seven bodies were recovered.
- 1855
  - Gouverneur Morris Jr. sells additional land to be combined with Morrisania Village to form the Town of Morrisania.
  - Fonthill Castle purchased to become the campus of the College of Mount St. Vincent.
  - The Union of Morrisania baseball team was founded in Morrisania.
- 1856 - The Haffen Brewing Company is founded by Matthias Haffen in the area of Melrose that is today known as "The Hub".
- 1857 - The foundry of Janes, Fowler, Kirtland & Company, owned by Adrian Janes moves to facilities in the Bronx in order to cast the second United States Capitol dome.
- 1860
  - The Robert Colgate House is constructed.
  - The Sunnyslope building is built.
- 1865 - The St. James' Episcopal Church and Parish House is consecrated.
- 1866 - St Barnabas Hospital founded.
- 1873 - The state legislature annexes three towns from Westchester County to New York City as of 1874. The three annexed towns of this "Annexed District" (later known as the West Bronx) were the Town of West Farms, the Town of Morrisania, and the Town of Kingsbridge.
- 1884
  - Montefiore Medical Center founded in Manhattan. In 1913 it moved to the Bronx.
  - Pelham Park and City Island Railway are both incorporated on August 30.
- 1888 - The Washington Bridge connects the Bronx and Manhattan island.
- 1889 - The Keeper's House at Williamsbridge Reservoir is built.

=== 1890s ===
- 1890
  - The Lebanon Hospital, a precursor to the Bronx-Lebanon Hospital Center, is founded.
  - Construction of the Webb's Academy and Home for Shipbuilders building began in 1890 14 acres (5.7 ha) of land on a bluff overlooking the Harlem and Hudson rivers.
- 1891 - New York Botanical Garden established.
- 1892
  - Union Railway Company of New York City, a streetcar franchise is chartered.
  - Fordham Hospital became the first public (municipal) hospital to be located in the Bronx.
- 1893 - The building for the Webb's Academy and Home for Shipbuilders was completed on the former Fordham estate of William Henry Webb. The building was "a romantic version of a medieval castle", with turrets, fanciful carving, and other flourishes.
- 1894
  - Bronx Chamber of Commerce founded.
  - Hall of Fame for Great Americans is built on what was then New York University's campus, which is now the Bronx Community College campus.
- 1895
  - The East Bronx, (including City Island) is transferred to New York City from Westchester County.
  - Van Cortlandt Park public golf course opens, the oldest public course in the United States.
- 1896 - The first United States marathon (40 km), ran from Stamford, Connecticut, to Columbia University's Columbia Oval athletic field in Norwood.
- 1897
  - Morris High School opens.
  - Jahn's ice cream parlor in business.
  - Bronx Borough Hall is constructed.
- 1898
  - January 1: The Bronx established as a borough in the City of Greater New York.
  - Louis F. Haffen becomes the first borough president.
  - Lincoln School for Nurses founded.
- 1899
  - April 29: The Colored Home and Hospital dedicated its new home at the corner of 141st Street and Southern Boulevard.
  - Bronx Zoo opens.
  - Calvary Hospital opens.

== 20th century ==
=== 1900s ===
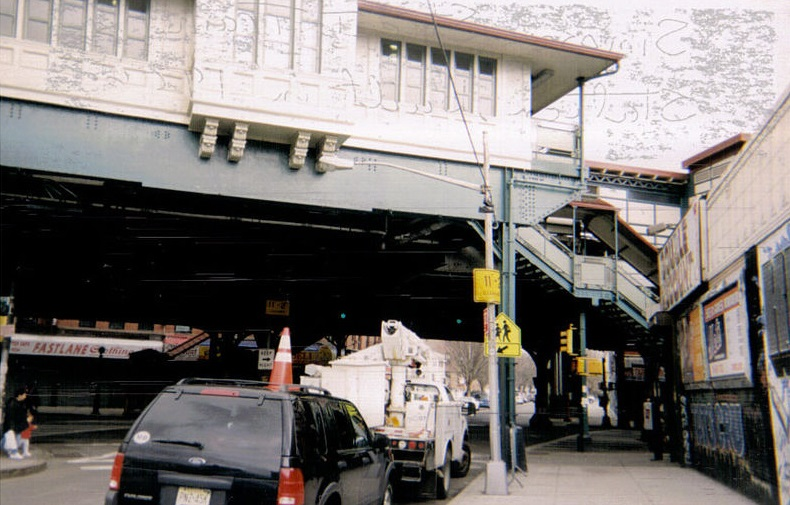
The Simpson Street station of the IRT White Plains Road Line was built in 1904 and opened on November 26, 1904. It was listed in the National Register of Historic Places on September 17, 2004, reference #04001027.

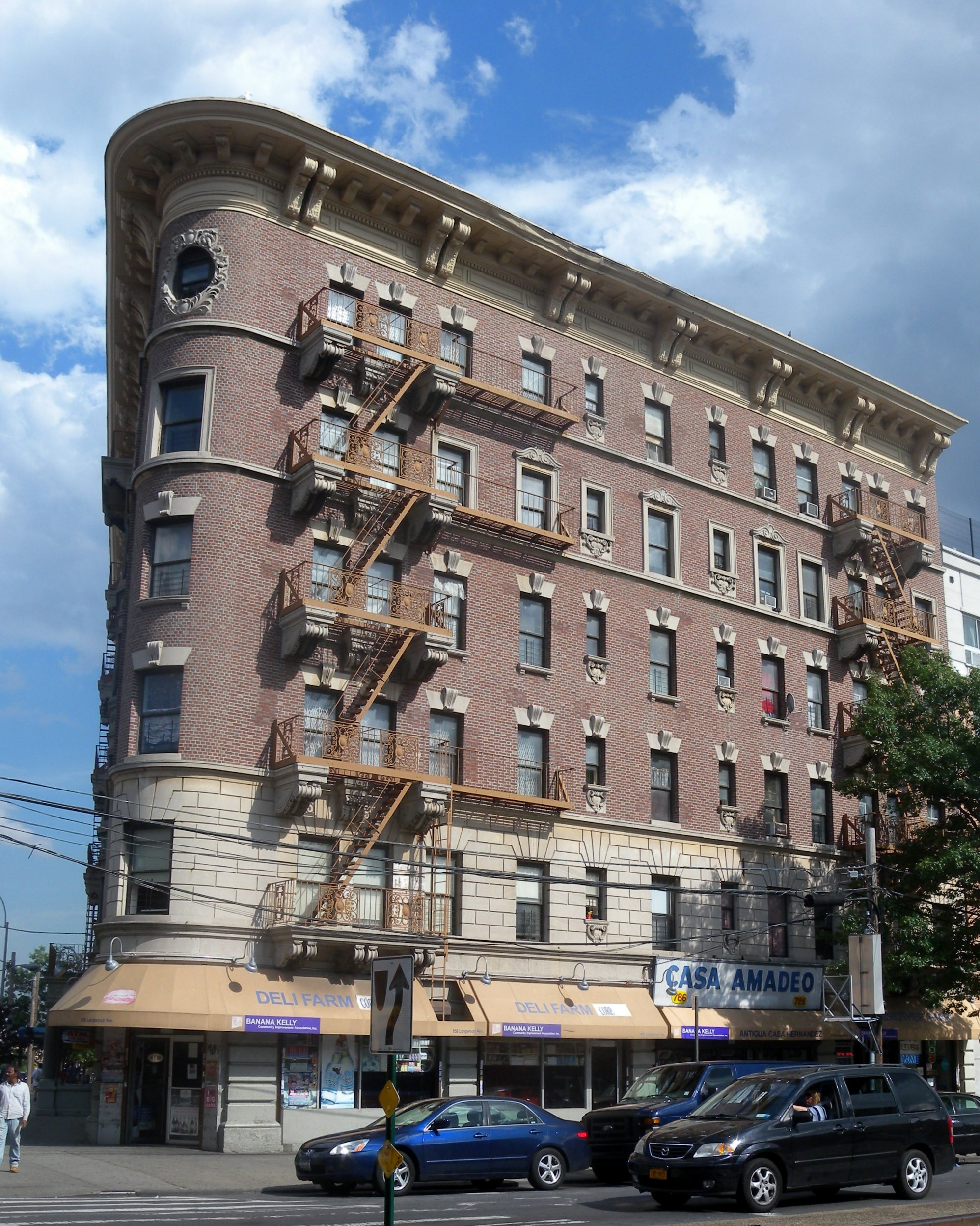
The Manhaset building (1905) in Longwood, since 1941 home of the oldest Latin music store in New York City.

The first published book of Bronx history: History of Bronx Borough, City of New York by Randall Comfort

- 1900 - The first class of the Lincoln School for Nurses graduated.
- 1901 - The first City Island Bridge opens.
- 1904 - IRT subway begins operating.
- 1905
  - New York Public Library Mott Haven branch opens.
  - Bronx Society of Arts and Sciences founded.
  - 145th Street Bridge opens.
- 1906
  - Jerome Park Reservoir built.
  - The 52nd Police Precinct Station House and Stable is completed.
  - Randall Comfort writes History of Bronx Borough, City of New York, which was published by the North Side News Press, of the Bronx.
  - Ota Benga is exhibited in the Bronx Zoo's Monkey House. The Howard Colored Orphan Asylum in Brooklyn later provided housing for him.
- 1907
  - The Bronx Home News begins publication.
  - Thomas Edison's Edison Studios moves to the Bronx.
- 1908 - Pelham Bridge opens.
- 1909
  - Grand Concourse begins operating.
  - John F. Murray, the Commissioner of Public Works, becomes the second borough president. after governor Charles Evans Hughes removes Louis F. Haffen from office.
  - 1909 South Brother island became uninhabited when the summer home of Jacob Ruppert, a brewery magnate and early owner of the New York Yankees, burned down.

=== 1910s ===
- 1910
  - Cyrus C. Miller becomes the third borough president.
  - The first motion picture adaptation of Mary Shelley's 1818 novel Frankenstein; or, The Modern Prometheus is filmed in the Bronx by Edison Studios.
- 1911 - Bronx Hospital established.
- 1912
  - Bronx County created (effected in 1914).
  - Design of the Bronx flag adopted.
  - The New York Knickerbockers of the United States Baseball League played in the Bronx Oval.
  - December 3: Borough President Miller proposed the creation of terminal markets in New York City, including the seeds of the original Bronx Terminal Market.
  - December 16: The first suffrage hike in America, organized by Rosalie Gardiner Jones, goes from the Bronx to Albany.
- 1913
  - Montefiore Medical Center moves to its current location in the Norwood neighborhood of the Bronx.
  - Bronx Opera House opens.
- 1914
  - January 1: The parts of New York County which had been annexed from Westchester County were newly constituted as the County of the Bronx, the 62nd and last county to be created by the state, effective in 1914.
  - Bronx Board of Trade established.
  - October 28: Birth of Jonas Salk.
  - Kingsbridge Armory built.
  - Douglas Mathewson becomes the fourth borough president.
  - Francis W. Martin takes office as the first Bronx County District Attorney.
- 1916 - Radio 2XG begins broadcasting.
- 1917
  - March 3: New York City transit stations for the IRT White Plains Road Line, including Allerton Avenue, Bronx Park East, Burke Avenue, East 180th Street, Gun Hill Road, Nereid Avenue, Pelham Parkway, 219th Street, 225th Street, and 233rd Street were opened for service.
  - The Bronx Terminal Market built.
  - Portions of the IRT Jerome Avenue Line opened.
  - The Pelham Bay Naval Training Station was constructed.
  - Columbia University turns over the Columbia War Hospital, to the United States Army. It is renamed U.S. Army General Hospital No. 1.
  - The Haffen Brewing Company is purchased, and closed down by Jacob Ruppert, Sr.
- 1918
  - Bronx Rotary Club formed.
  - Henry Bruckner becomes the fifth borough president.
  - IRT Jerome Avenue Line fully opened.
  - Portions of the IRT Pelham Line are opened.
  - The Bronx International Exposition of Science, Arts and Industries takes place in Exposition Park (Starlight Park)

=== 1920s ===
- 1920
  - Population: 732,016.
  - Final part of the IRT Pelham Line is opened.
- 1921 - May: The Bronx Board of Trade honors James L. Wells as the "Father of the Bronx".
- 1922 - Manhattan College moves to the Riverdale section of the Bronx.
- 1923 - Yankee Stadium opens.
- 1924 - The Andrew Freedman Home opens.
- 1925 - Bronx River Parkway built.
- 1927 - Amalgamated Dwellings housing project built.
- 1928 - Alexander's department store in business.
- 1929
  - Loew's Paradise Theatre in business.
  - June 26: Birth of Jules Feiffer.

=== 1930s ===
- 1930
  - Loehmann's shop in business.
  - December 10, 1930: A bank run at the 1254 Southern Boulevard branch leads to the financial collapse of the Bank of United States.
  - Population: 1,265,258.
- 1931
  - Hunter College Bronx campus opens.
  - Stella D'oro bakery in business.
- 1933
  - IND Concourse Line opens.
  - Monroe College established in the West Farms section of the Bronx.
  - July 7: The Industrial Union Party DeLeonist political party is formed at 1032 Prospect Avenue.
- 1934
  - James J. Lyons becomes the sixth borough president (in office until 1962).
  - Bronx County Courthouse built.
- 1935 - Construction of the Mosholu Parkway begins.
- 1936
  - The Triboro Bridge and Henry Hudson Bridge open.
  - June 19, 1936: In Yankee Stadium, German ex-heavyweight champion boxer Max Schmeling defeats American and not-yet-champion Joe Louis, in an upset that was used as propaganda by the Nazi regime.
- 1937
  - Bronx General Post Office built.
  - Bronx County Jail built.
  - Mosholu Parkway is completed.
  - Williamsbridge Oval Park is opened.
- 1938
  - Bronx High School of Science established.
  - SUNY Maritime College moves to its present Throggs Neck campus in Fort Schuyler.
  - June 22, 1938: Now-heavyweight boxing champion Joe Louis defeats Max Schmeling, in a rematch of their 1936 Yankee Stadium bout, again played up by both countries for propaganda purposes.
- 1939 - Bronx-Whitestone Bridge opens.

=== 1940s ===
- 1940
  - Bronx Press-Review newspaper begins publication.
  - April 25: Birth of Al Pacino.
- 1941
  - IRT Dyre Avenue Line opens.
  - Casa Amadeo music store opens.
- 1944 Cyrus C. Miller was appointed as the first official Bronx Borough Historian in 1944, and continued that appointment until 1953.
- 1946 - April: The United Nations moved to Hunter College's Bronx campus (now Lehman College) for almost five months, until August 15, 1946.
- 1947 - Over six million New Yorkers are vaccinated in order to end the 1947 New York City smallpox outbreak.
- 1948 - The remaining streetcars of the Third Avenue Railway are replaced by buses.
- 1949 - Kingsbridge Historical Society formed.

=== 1950s ===
- 1950
  - Patterson Houses built.
  - Riverdale Press newspaper is founded.
- 1951 - Bronx River Houses built.
- 1953
  - Liebman's deli in business.
  - Albert Einstein College of Medicine established.
- 1955
  - Deegan Expressway and Cross Bronx Expressway begin operating.
  - Bronx County Historical Society established.
- 1956 - The Third Avenue Railway is purchased by New York City Omnibus Corporation.
- 1957
  - Bronx Community College established.
  - July 20, 1957: the Rev. Billy Graham holds a prayer service at Yankee Stadium attended by over 100,000 people, including vice-president Richard Nixon.
- 1959 - Original Products botánica active.

=== 1960s ===
- 1960
  - Loeser's deli in business.
  - Freedomland U.S.A. opens.
  - Häagen-Dazs is created by Reuben and Rose Mattus.
  - First coronary artery bypass surgery performed at the Albert Einstein College of Medicine-Bronx Municipal Hospital Center.
- 1961
  - The last class of the Lincoln School for Nurses graduated.
  - Throgs Neck Bridge opens.
- 1962
  - Bronx-Lebanon Hospital Center established.
  - Joseph F. Periconi becomes the seventh borough president.
  - Bus operator New York City Omnibus Corporation goes bankrupt and its operations are taken over by the Manhattan and Bronx Surface Transit Operating Authority.
  - The Bronx Council on the Arts is established.
- 1963
  - The revised (1963) New York City Charter creates community boards within each borough.
  - Cross Bronx Expressway completed.
- 1965 - November 9: Northeast blackout of 1965.
- 1966 - Herman Badillo becomes the eighth borough president.
- 1967
  - City University of New York's Lehman College established.
  - Hunts Point Terminal Market opens.
- 1968
  - Museum of Bronx History opens.
  - Savage Seven street gang formed.
  - Hostos Community College established.
- 1969
  - Graffitist Taki 183 active.
  - Bronx Borough Hall is demolished.

=== 1970s ===
- 1970
  - Co-op City housing complex built.
  - Robert Abrams becomes the ninth borough president.
  - July 14: Members of the Young Lords Party staged a protest which lasted 12 hours to address issues at Lincoln Hospital.
  - Population: 1,471,701.
- 1971
  - Bronx Museum of the Arts established.
  - December 8: The Hoe Avenue peace meeting between New York City gangs took place.
  - The Office of the Special Narcotics Prosecutor for the City of New York is created to handle drugs related crimes.
- 1972 - BronxWorks human service organization is founded as "Citizens Advice Bureau".
- 1973 - Hip hop disc jockey Kool Herc active; Universal Zulu Nation founded.
- 1974
  - Northwest Bronx Community and Clergy Coalition formed.
  - Hip hop disc jockeys Afrika Bambaataa, Grandmaster Caz, and Grandmaster Flash active.
- 1975
  - Bronx News newspaper is founded.
  - The newly completed 44 story tall River Park Towers become the tallest buildings in the borough.
- 1976
  - City Island Nautical Museum opens.
  - July 15: Fordham Hospital, which was the first public (municipal) hospital in the Bronx, is closed.
  - September 28: Muhammad Ali wins the last boxing match to be staged at Yankee Stadium. Police officers demonstrated outside the stadium as a part of a labor action,
  - October 25: The $100 million North Central Bronx Hospital is opened
- 1977
  - July 13–14: New York City blackout of 1977.
  - October: United States President Jimmy Carter visits South Bronx.
  - Rock Steady Crew musical group formed.
  - Rosalyn Sussman Yalow receives the Nobel Prize for the invention of Radioimmunoassay (RIA), which she developed with Solomon Berson while working in the Bronx Veterans Administration Hospital.
- 1978
  - Disco Fever dance club active.
  - Royal Caribbean Bakery in business.
  - Robert García becomes U.S. representative for New York's 21st congressional district.
  - Fashion Moda art space active.
- 1979
  - Stanley Simon becomes the tenth borough president.
  - Cold Crush Brothers musical group active.
  - October 2, 1979: Pope John Paul II celebrates "Mass at the Stadium for World Justice and Peace" at Yankee Stadium.

=== 1980s ===
- 1981 - Bronx Times-Reporter newspaper is founded.
- 1982
  - Bathgate Industrial Park opened
  - Hostos Center for the Arts & Culture, a performing arts and visual arts center in Hostos Community College opens.
- 1983 - Baen Books, the science fiction and fantasy publishing house is formed.
- 1984 - Shooting of Eleanor Bumpurs by police.
- 1987 - Fernando Ferrer becomes the eleventh borough president.
- 1988
  - Norwood News begins publication.
  - Conviction of Wedtech scandal participants.
- 1989
  - The offices of the Riverdale Press are firebombed
  - The first Golden Krust Caribbean Bakery restaurant opens on East Gunhill Road.

=== 1990s ===
- 1990
  - José E. Serrano becomes U.S. representative for New York's 18th congressional district.
  - 87 people die in Happy Land fire
  - June 21, 1990: Nelson Mandela is welcomed at Yankee Stadium by 80,000 people at the beginning of an 11-day tour of the United States, after being released from prison in South Africa.
- 1991 - Concourse Plaza Multiplex cinema in business.
- 1992 - Mothers on the Move group formed.
- 1993
  - Riverdale Review newspaper begins publication.
  - The POINT Community Development Corporation is founded in Hunts Point.
  - The movie A Bronx Tale is released.
- 1994
  - Death of Anthony Baez
  - First "Tour de Bronx" bike ride, organized by Bronx Borough President Fernando Ferrer and the Bronx Tourism Council, was held.
- 1995 - Per Scholas, the educational nonprofit organization is established.
- 1996
  - La Division 21 botánica active.
  - July 4: Death of Nathaniel Levi Gaines at the 167th Street station "D" line platform.
  - Lloyd Ultan is appointed as the fourth Bronx Borough Historian by Bronx Borough President Fernando Ferrer.
- 1999 - February 5: Shooting of Amadou Diallo.
- 2000
  - Bronx Preparatory Charter School established.
  - Ghetto Film School active.
  - October 8: Molotov cocktails are thrown at the Conservative Synagogue Adath Israel of Riverdale

== 21st century ==
=== 2000s ===
- September 23, 2001: A memorial service, titled "Prayer for America," is held at Yankee Stadium to remember the victims of the September 11 attacks.
- 2002 - Adolfo Carrión, Jr. becomes the twelfth borough president.
- 2003
  - January 24: Four teenage boys drown in the Long Island Sound near City Island when their overloaded dinghy sinks. A communication misunderstanding between them and the 911 dispatcher contributed to their deaths
  - August 14: Northeast blackout of 2003.
  - Celia Cruz Bronx High School of Music established.
- 2005
  - November: Fulton Fish Market moves to Hunts Point.
  - East Bronx History Forum established.
  - Two FDNY firefighters are killed on Black Sunday.
  - The Bronx Children's Museum is created.
- 2006
  - Bronx County Hall of Justice built.
  - Hunts Point Express newspaper is founded.
  - José the Beaver spotted in the Bronx River.
- 2008 - April 20, 2008: Pope Benedict XVI leads Mass at Yankee Stadium celebrating the bicentennial of the Archdiocese of New York.
- 2009
  - A new Yankee Stadium is built next to the site of the prior Yankee stadium.
  - Hutchinson Metro Center office complex built.
  - Rubén Díaz, Jr. becomes the thirteenth borough president.
  - Bronx Terminal Market (shopping mall) in business.
  - Mott Haven Herald newspaper is founded.
  - May 2: Four men were arrested for the 2009 Bronx terrorism plot.

=== 2010s ===
- 2010
  - Population: 1,385,108 in the Bronx.
  - A second beaver takes residence in the Bronx River. The beaver is named "Justin" after the Canadian singer Justin Bieber in a contest held by the Bronx Zoo.
  - July 25: A tornado touched down in Riverdale.
- 2011 - March 12: World Wide Tours bus crash
- 2012
  - February 2: Ramarley Graham was shot by a NYPD officer.
  - July 31: Homicide victim Ramona Moore was last seen near Crotona Park.
- 2013
  - Plan to redevelop the Kingsbridge Armory into the Kingsbridge National Ice Center is announced.
  - July 2013 Spuyten Duyvil derailment - freight train derailment.
  - December 1: December 2013 Spuyten Duyvil derailment 4 people are killed and scores injured after a Metro-North Railroad train derailed near the Spuyten Duyvil station in the Bronx.
- 2014 - Governor Andrew Cuomo expresses his support for the Penn Station Access project in his 2014 State of the State address. The project includes the creation of four new Metro-North stations, one in Hunts Point, and the rest in the East Bronx.
- 2015 - Two outbreaks of Legionnaires' disease take place.
- 2017
  - December 2: Golden Krust founder and CEO Lowell Hawthorne commits suicide in the company's Claremont factory.
  - December 28: Prospect Avenue fire - On the night of December 28, 2017, a fire tore through an apartment building in the Belmont neighborhood of the Bronx. Thirteen people died and 14 were injured. It was the deadliest fire in New York City in 25 years.
- 2018
  - Voters of the 14th Congressional district elect Alexandria Ocasio-Cortez as their representative, replacing Joe Crowley.
  - June 20: Death of Lesandro Guzman-Feliz
- 2019 - August 18–21: The 2019 Bronx Open Women's Tennis Association international tournament was held in Crotona Park.

=== 2020s ===
- 2021 - February 5: SOMOS Community Care opened up Yankee Stadium as a COVID-19 vaccination "mega-site" operated by the SOMOS and the New York National Guard. Former Yankee Mariano Rivera participated in the opening of the site.
- 2022
  - January 1: Vanessa Gibson became the fourteenth Bronx Borough President, as well as the first female and first African American elected to that office.
  - January 9: At least nineteen people were killed, and at least 60 others were injured, after a fire tore through an apartment building in the Fordham Heights neighborhood of the Bronx. Officials are expecting it to be one of the New York City's worst fires in modern times.

== See also ==
- History of the Bronx
- History of the South Bronx
- List of New York City Designated Landmarks in the Bronx
- National Register of Historic Places listings in the Bronx
- List of streetcar lines in the Bronx
- List of New York City Subway stations in the Bronx
- List of Bronx neighborhoods
- List of events at Yankee Stadium (1923)

other NYC boroughs

- Timeline of Brooklyn
- Timeline of Queens
- Timeline of Staten Island
- Timeline of New York City - a timeline inclusive of both Greater New York City and Manhattan history.

== Bibliography ==
- Trow's Business Directory of Manhattan and the Bronx. Trow (Formerly Wilson's) business directory of the boroughs of Manhattan and the Bronx, city of New York1903-1911. NY: Trow. 1898.

=== Published in 20th century ===
1900s-1940s

- Trow's General Directory of Manhattan and the Bronx. NY. 1909.
- Arthur Fremont Rider (1916), "The Bronx", Rider's New York City and Vicinity, New York: H. Holt and Company – via Internet Archive
- James L. Wells; et al., eds. (1927). The Bronx and Its People; A History 1609-1927. Lewis Historical Publishing Company. OCLC 6456406.. 3 volumes
- Federal Writers' Project (1939). "The Bronx". New York City Guide. American Guide Series. New York: Random House. hdl:2027/mdp.39015008975883 – via HathiTrust.

1950s-1990s

- Bronx County Historical Society Journal, ISSN 0007-2249. 1964–present
- Lloyd Ultan (1979). The Beautiful Bronx (1920-1950). Arlington House. ISBN 978-0-517-54800-4.
- Melissa McRaney Good (1995), New York Diary, Philadelphia: Old City Books, ISBN 0-9646192-0-2, OL 818803M
- Bill Twomey and John McNamara (1998). Throggs Neck-Pelham Bay. Images of America. Arcadia Publishing. ISBN 9780738500133.
- Stephen M. Samtur; Martin A. Jackson (1999). The Bronx: Lost, Found, and Remembered, 1935-1975. Back in the Bronx. ISBN 0965722112.
- Bill Twomey (1999). East Bronx. Images of America. Arcadia. ISBN 9780738503011.
- Lloyd Ultan; Gary Hermalyn (2000). The Birth of the Bronx: 1609-1900. Bronx County Historical Society. ISBN 978-0-941980-38-8.
- Lloyd Ultan; Barbara Unger (2000). Bronx Accent: A Literary and Pictorial History of the Borough. Rutgers University Press. ISBN 978-0-8135-2863-2.

=== Published in 21st century ===
2000s

- Julie Ault, ed. (2002). "Chronology of selected alternative structures, spaces, artists' groups, and organizations in New York City, 1965-85". Alternative Art, New York, 1965-1985. University of Minnesota Press. ISBN 978-0-8166-3794-2.
- Jill Jonnes (2002). South Bronx Rising: The Rise, Fall, and Resurrection of an American City. Fordham University Press. ISBN 978-0-8232-2199-8.
- Jeffrey A. Kroessler (2002), New York Year by Year: A Chronology of the Great Metropolis, New York University Press, ISBN 0-8147-4751-5
- Bill Twomey (2002). South Bronx. Images of America. Arcadia. ISBN 9780738510200.
- James Trager (2003). New York Chronology. Harper Collins. ISBN 978-0-06-201860-1.
- Evelyn Diaz Gonzalez (2004). The Bronx. Columbia University Press. ISBN 978-0-231-50835-3.
- Celina Su (2009). Streetwise for Book Smarts: Grassroots Organizing and Education Reform in the Bronx. Cornell University Press. ISBN 978-0-8014-5809-5.

2010s

- Kenneth T. Jackson, ed. (2010). "Bronx". Encyclopedia of New York City (2nd ed.). Yale University Press. ISBN 978-0-300-18257-6. (+ 1st ed., 1995, via Internet Archive)
- Norval White; et al. (2010). AIA Guide to New York City (5th ed.). Oxford University Press. ISBN 978-0-19-977291-9.
- Bill Twomey; Thomas X. Casey (2011). Northwest Bronx. Images of America. Arcadia. ISBN 978-1-4396-3930-6.
- Andrew F. Smith, ed. (2015). Savoring Gotham: a Food Lovers Companion to New York City. Oxford University Press. ISBN 978-0-19-026363-8.
- Lloyd Ultan; Shelley Olson (2015). The Bronx: The Ultimate Guide to New York City's Beautiful Borough. Rutgers University Press. ISBN 978-0-8135-7320-5.
