= Terminal market =

Type of trading place

A terminal market is a central site, often in a metropolitan area, that serves as an assembly and trading place for commodities. Terminal markets for agricultural commodities are usually at or near major transportation hubs. One of the models of a Terminal Market is a Hub-and-Spoke model wherein the Terminal Market is the hub which is to be linked to a number of collection centers - the spokes.

The term is also used for markets in other commodities such as metals and bullion.

== List of terminal markets (fresh produce) ==
=== California ===
- Alemany Farmers' Market – San Francisco, CA
- Ferry Plaza Farmers Market & Ferry Building Marketplace – San Francisco, CA

==== Los Angeles ====
- Grand Central Market – Los Angeles, CA
- Los Angeles Farmers Market – Los Angeles, CA
- Olvera Street – Los Angeles, CA
- ROW DTLA, formerly Terminal Market - Los Angeles

=== Florida ===
- Yellow Green Farmers Market (2010–present) — Hollywood, FL

=== Georgia ===
- Ponce City Market – Atlanta, GA
- Sweet Auburn Curb Market (1918–present) – Atlanta, GA

=== Illinois ===
==== Chicago ====
- Chicago farmers' markets Chicago, IL
- Chicago International Produce Market - Chicago, IL
- Maxwell Street Market – Chicago, IL

=== Indiana ===
- Indiana - farmers' markets, IN

=== Louisiana ===
- Crescent City Farmers Market – New Orleans, LA
- French Market – New Orleans, LA

=== Maryland ===
==== Baltimore ====
- Cross Street Market – Baltimore, MD
- Hollins Market – Baltimore, MD
- Lexington Market (1782–present) – Baltimore, MD

=== Massachusetts ===
- Boston Public Market – Boston, MA
- Haymarket – Boston, MA
- New England Produce Center - Chelsea, MA

=== Michigan ===
- Eastern Market – Detroit, MI

=== Missouri ===
- Soulard Market – St. Louis, MO

=== Montana ===
- Midtown Global Market – Minneapolis, MN

=== New York (state) ===
- Troy Flea – Troy, NY

==== New York City ====
- Bronx Terminal Market - Bronx, NY
- Brooklyn Flea – Brooklyn, NY
- Fulton Fish Market New York, NY
- Grand Central Market – New York, NY
- Hunts Point Cooperative Market - Bronx, NY
- La Marqueta – New York, NY
- Union Square Greenmarket – New York, NY

=== Ohio ===
- Findlay Market (1855–present)– Cincinnati, OH
- North Market – Columbus, OH
- PNC Second Street Market – Dayton, OH
- West Side Market – Cleveland, OH

=== Oregon ===
==== Portland ====
- James Beard Public Market (future) – Portland, OR
- Portland Public Market (1933–1942) – Portland, OR
- Portland Saturday Market (1974–present) – Portland, OR

=== Pennsylvania ===
- Broad Street Market – Harrisburg, PA
- Italian Market – Philadelphia, PA
- Lancaster Central Market – Lancaster, PA
- Reading Terminal Market (1893–present) – Philadelphia, PA

=== Rhode island ===
- Providence Terminal Produce Market - Providence, RI

=== South Carolina ===
- City Market - Charleston, SC

=== Tennessee ===
- Chattanooga Market (2001–present) – Chattanooga, TN

=== Texas ===
- Dallas Farmers Market – Dallas, TX

=== Virginia ===
- City Market – Petersburg, VA. Built in 1878–79 and listed on the National Register of Historic Places

=== Washington (state) ===
- Pike Place Market (1907–present) – Seattle, WA

=== Washington, D.C. ===
- Eastern Market – Washington, D.C.
- Union Market – Washington, D.C.

=== Wisconsin ===
- Milwaukee Public Market (2005–present) – Milwaukee, WI
