= Cyrus C. Miller =

Cyrus Chace Miller
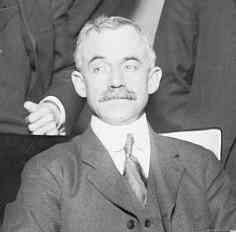

3rd Borough President of The Bronx
- In office January 1, 1910 – December 31, 1913
- Preceded by: John F. Murray
- Succeeded by: Douglas Mathewson

Personal details
- Born: November 2, 1866 Claverack, New York, U.S.
- Died: January 21, 1956 (aged 89) The Bronx, New York City, U.S.
- Resting place: Woodlawn Cemetery, The Bronx, New York City, U.S.
- Children: 2
- Education: New York University
- Alma mater: Columbia Law School
- Occupation: historian; lacrosse player
- Profession: attorney
- Coaching career

Playing career
- 1886–1888: NYU Violets
- Positions: Defenseman, point

Coaching career (HC unless noted)
- 1899?–1900?: Columbia Lions

Cyrus Chace Miller (November 2, 1866 – January 21, 1956) was the third Borough President of The Bronx, and an American lacrosse player. He played college lacrosse as an undergraduate at New York University and served as the team captain. Miller later played with the amateur organizations, the Staten Island Athletic Club and the Crescent Athletic Club. He also coached the Columbia University team for several years.

== Education ==
He was born November 2, 1866 in Claverack, New York, the son of attorney Jacob F. Miller, a Williams College graduate. He attended college at New York University (NYU), where he played lacrosse and served as the team captain. He received a Bachelor of Arts degree in 1888. After graduating college, he played with the Staten Island Athletic Club and captained the lacrosse team to the 1890 championship. He then attended law school at Columbia University, where he graduated cum laude in 1891.

== Lacrosse ==
Staten Island participated in the 1892 Amateur Athletic Union (AAU) tournament with the Lorillard, Manhattan, and New York clubs. There were allegations of professionalism and the importation of ineligible Canadian ringers by those three teams, and Staten Island played only under protest. Miller was critical of the New York club in particular:

When a club deliberately imports six or eight of the best players in Canada, feeds them like fighting cocks, keeps them with nothing to do from one week's end to another but play lacrosse, and then plays them against a team composed of business men who don't get a chance to practice more than three or four hours a week, I think it's about time to stop it ... Although we are not afraid to take a beating from a Canadian team as such, we don't care to be beaten by Canadians and have a New York club get the credit of it.

He played for the Crescent Athletic Club from 1895 to 1912. In 1897, Miller accompanied the Crescent team on a tour of England with each player paying his own way as a testament to their club's principle of amateurism. After an abbreviated domestic season, the team left for England in March. There, they compiled a record of 7–5–2 against British clubs.

Miller served as the head coach for the Columbia lacrosse team for several years. In 1900, The New York Times erroneously reported that he had received a payment of $150 for his services as coach, which he denied in a letter to the editor. He stated "I have been somewhat strenuous in advocating the principles of pure amateur sport, I prefer not to remain under the stigma of receiving money for athletics." The confusion arose due to Miller advising the team to hire a professional coach, as he no longer had enough free time to devote to the task. The manager requisitioned $150 to hire a replacement coach, but the athletics department denied it due to a lack of funds.

He served as the president of the Professional Lacrosse Association, and from 1900 to 1902, as the president of the Inter-University Lacrosse League. The United States Intercollegiate Lacrosse Association (USILA) came into being on December 22, 1905, through Miller's proposal. He recommended the combination of the Inter-university Lacrosse League and the Intercollegiate Association, which at the time, played under slightly different rules. In the USILA, Miller served on the Executive Committee.

Miller was hopeful for the future of the sport and described it as follows:

When the United States and Canada are unified, Lacrosse may well claim to be the national game of the Union; for long before the earliest white pioneers and voyageurs in North America, the game of baggataway, which afterwards became lacrosse, was played by the Indian tribes in widely scattered parts of the northern continent of America ... With the elimination of old methods of play, the white man has introduced team play and science into the game, so that now it is recognized that no team of individual players, no matter how skilful [sic], can beat a team of merely good players who have fine team organization.

== Professional life ==
Miller was an attorney by trade and worked for most of his life at the law firm started by his father. From 1910 to 1914, Miller served as the Bronx's third Borough President. In 1912 Borough President Miler proposed the creation of terminal markets in New York City, including the seeds of the original Bronx Terminal Market. In his New York Times obituary, it is noted that Miller was considered as "the father of the Bronx Terminal Market".

He served on the Real Estate Board which handled the expansion of the New York City Subway system, and in 1917, was named to the New York State and the United States Food Administration Boards. He also was a trustee of NYU.

Miller was appointed as the first official Bronx Borough Historian in 1944, and continued that appointment until 1953.

He died on January 21, 1956, and is interred in Woodlawn Cemetery in The Bronx, New York City. US Lacrosse inducted him into the National Lacrosse Hall of Fame in 1957.

== See also ==
- Timeline of the Bronx, 20th c.

Political offices
| Preceded by John F. Murray | Borough President of Bronx; 1910-1913 | Succeeded by Douglas Mathewson |

Educational offices
| Preceded by office created | Bronx Borough Historian; 1944–1953 | Succeeded by Theodore Kazimiroff |
