= Henry Bruckner =

American politician

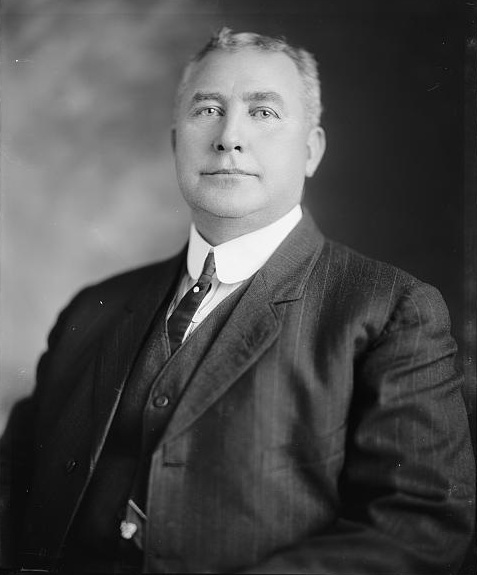

5th Borough President of the Bronx
- In office January 1, 1918 – December 31, 1933
- Preceded by: Douglas Mathewson
- Succeeded by: James J. Lyons

Member of the U.S. House of Representatives from New York's 22nd district
- In office March 4, 1913 – December 31, 1917
- Preceded by: William H. Draper
- Succeeded by: Anthony J. Griffin

Member of the New York State Assembly from the New York County, 35th district
- In office January 1, 1901 – December 31, 1901
- Preceded by: William E. Morris
- Succeeded by: Franklin Grady

Personal details
- Born: June 17, 1871 Bronx, New York, U.S.
- Died: April 14, 1942 (aged 70) Bronx, New York, U.S.
- Party: Democratic
- Spouse: Helen Zobel

Henry Bruckner (June 17, 1871 – April 14, 1942) was an American politician from New York who served three terms in the U.S. House of Representatives from 1913 to 1917.

== Life ==
Born in New York City, he attended the common and high schools in New York and became engaged in the manufacture of mineral waters in 1892. He was a member of the New York State Assembly (New York Co., 35th D.) in 1901. He was commissioner of public works for the borough of the Bronx from 1902 to 1905.

Bruckner was elected as a Democrat to the Sixty-third, Sixty-fourth, and Sixty-fifth Congresses and held office from March 4, 1913, until December 31, 1917, when he resigned; while in the House he was chairman of the Committee on Railways and Canals (Sixty-fifth Congress). He resumed his former business pursuits in New York City and was also interested in banking; from 1918 to 1934 he was Bronx Borough president. He died in the Bronx in 1942. He is interred at Woodlawn Cemetery in the Bronx.

One of the Bronx's main freeways, the Bruckner Expressway, is named in his honor.

== See also ==
- Timeline of the Bronx, 20th c.

== Sources ==
- United States Congress. "Henry Bruckner (id: B000974)". Biographical Directory of the United States Congress.

New York State Assembly
Preceded by William E. Morris	New York State Assembly; New York County, 35th District; 1901	Succeeded by Franklin Grady
Political offices
Preceded by Douglas Mathewson	Borough President of the Bronx; 1918–1934	Succeeded by James J. Lyons
U.S. House of Representatives
Preceded by William H. Draper	Member of the U.S. House of Representatives from New York's 22nd congressional district March 4, 1913 – December 31, 1917	Succeeded by Anthony J. Griffin
