= List of events at Yankee Stadium (1923) =

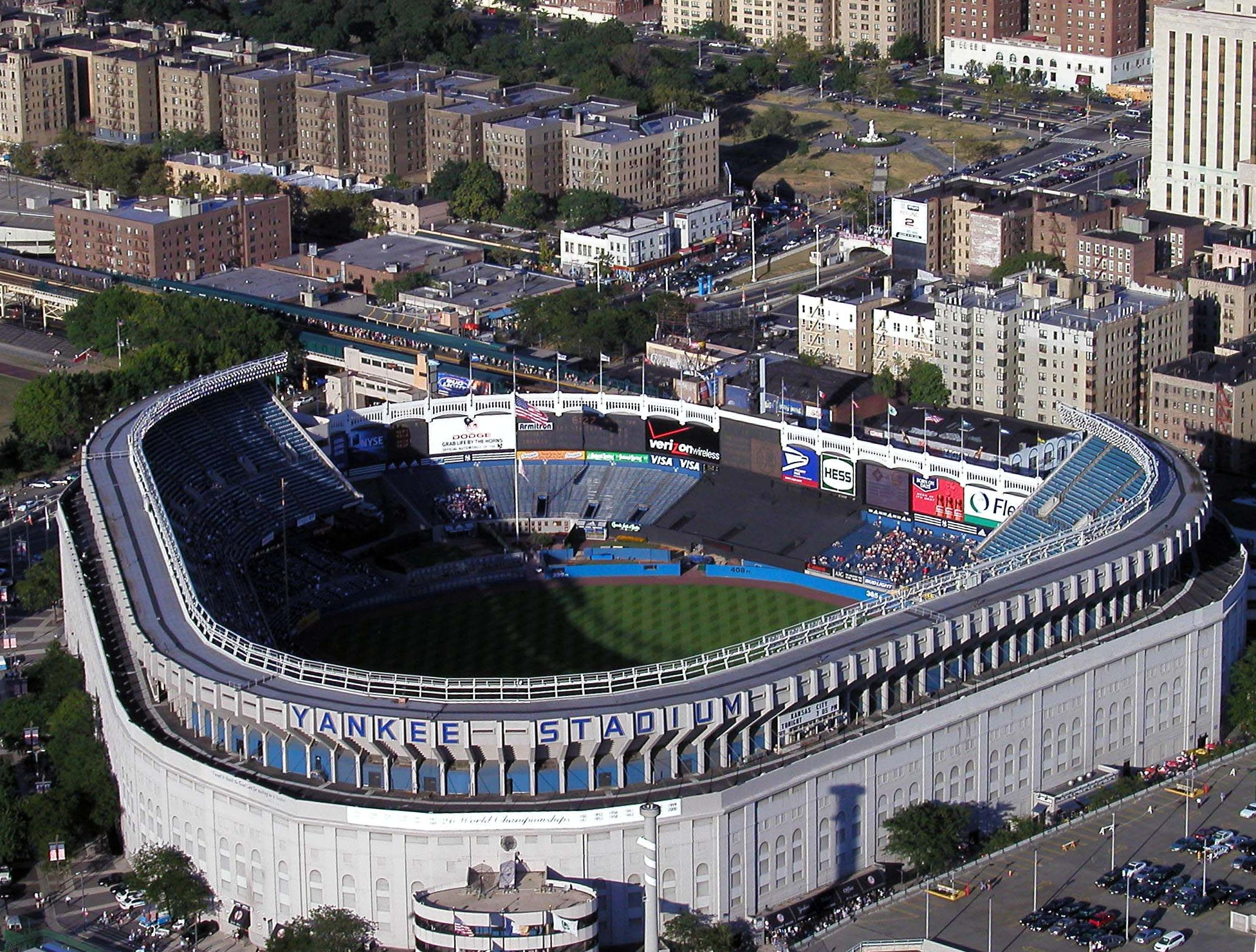
Yankee Stadium was home to the New York Yankees from 1923 to 1973 and 1976 to 2008.

Yankee Stadium was a stadium that opened in 1923 and closed in 2008. It was primarily the home field of the New York Yankees professional baseball club for over eight decades, but it also hosted football games (especially involving the New York Giants professional football team), boxing matches, live concerts, and Papal visits in its 85 years of existence.

== 1920s ==
- April 18, 1923: Yankee Stadium officially opens for the New York Yankees' home opener. Babe Ruth hits the ballpark's first home run as the Yankees defeat the Boston Red Sox, 4–3.
- May 12, 1923: First boxing match at the stadium, featuring former heavyweight champion Jess Willard against Floyd Johnson. It draws 63,000 spectators.
- October 8, 1926: the St. Louis Cardinals defeat the Yankees 3–2 to win the 1926 World Series, four games to three.
- September 30, 1927: Yankees player Babe Ruth hits his 60th home run of the season as the Yankees defeat the Washington Senators 4–2, setting a new single season record that would stand until 1961.
- October 8, 1927: the Yankees defeat the Pittsburgh Pirates 4–3 to sweep the 1927 World Series.
- November 10, 1928: the University of Notre Dame football team defeats favored Army 12–6, after coach Knute Rockne gives his famous "Win one for the Gipper" pep talk to the team.

== 1930s ==
- May 30, 1932: The Yankees dedicate a monument in center field to Miller Huggins, their former manager who had died in 1929. It is the beginning of the Stadium's Monument Park.
- June 19, 1936: German ex-heavyweight champion boxer Max Schmeling defeats American and not-yet-champion Joe Louis, in an upset that was used as propaganda by the Nazi regime.
- August 27, 1938: Yankees pitcher Monte Pearson throws a no-hitter against the Cleveland Indians.
- June 22, 1938: Now-heavyweight boxing champion Joe Louis defeats Max Schmeling, in a rematch of their 1936 bout, again played up by both countries for propaganda purposes.
- October 9, 1938: the Yankees defeat the Chicago Cubs 8–3 to win the 1938 World Series, four games to none.
- July 4, 1939: the Yankees celebrate "Lou Gehrig Appreciation Day". Gehrig, up until months prior had put together a career-spanning streak of 2,130 consecutive games played, but was now forced out of action permanently by amyotrophic lateral sclerosis and was dying unbeknownst to the public. Gehrig delivered his famous "Luckiest Man on the Face of the Earth" speech in pregame ceremonies dedicated to him.

== 1940s ==
- May 15, 1941: Joe DiMaggio begins his Major League record 56-game hitting streak with a single off of Eddie Smith of the Chicago White Sox.
- October 5, 1942: the St. Louis Cardinals defeat the Yankees 4–2 to win the 1942 World Series, four games to one.
- April 30, 1946: Cleveland Indians pitcher Bob Feller throws a no-hitter against the Yankees.
- May 28, 1946: First night game at Yankee Stadium; Washington Senators defeat the Yankees 2–1.
- June 19, 1946: In the first televised boxing match Joe Louis defeats Billy Conn in their rematch to defend the world heavyweight championship.
- October 6, 1947: the Yankees defeat the Brooklyn Dodgers 5–2 to win the 1947 World Series, four games to three.
- June 13, 1948: the Yankees hold a tribute to Babe Ruth and the 25th anniversary of the opening of Yankee Stadium; the event yields a Pulitzer Prize-winning photo of a dying Ruth, from behind, facing right field and using a bat as a cane.
- August 17–18, 1948: Babe Ruth lies in repose at Yankee Stadium following his death on August 16.

== 1950s ==
- September 27, 1950: Undisputed Heavyweight Champion Ezzard Charles defeats former long regaining champion Joe Louis by unanimous decision.
- October 7, 1950: the Yankees defeat the Philadelphia Phillies 5–2 to win the 1950 World Series, four games to none.
- September 28, 1951: Yankees pitcher Allie Reynolds throws a no-hitter against the Boston Red Sox.
- October 10, 1951: the Yankees defeat the New York Giants to win the 1951 World Series, four games to two.
- August 25, 1952: Detroit Tigers pitcher Virgil Trucks throws a no-hitter against the Yankees.
- October 5, 1953: the Yankees defeat the Brooklyn Dodgers 4–3 to win the 1953 World Series, four games to two.
- June 17, 1954: Undisputed Heavyweight Champion Rocky Marciano defeats former champion Ezzard Charles by unanimous decision.
- September 17, 1954: Undisputed Heavyweight Champion Rocky Marciano defeats former champion Ezzard Charles by 8th-round KO in Ring magazine's Fight of the Year
- September 21, 1955: Undisputed Heavyweight Champion Rocky Marciano defeats Undisputed Light Heavyweight Champion Archie Moore by 9th-round KO in the final bout of his career.
- October 4, 1955: the Brooklyn Dodgers defeat the Yankees 2–0 to win the 1955 World Series, four games to three, the only championship won by the Dodgers while they were in Brooklyn.
- October 8, 1956: Yankees pitcher Don Larsen throws a perfect game against the Brooklyn Dodgers in Game 5 of the 1956 World Series, becoming the first pitcher to ever pitch a no-hitter in postseason play but remains the only perfect game.
- October 21, 1956: the New York Giants defeat the Pittsburgh Steelers, 38–10, marking the Giants' first game at Yankee Stadium. Yankee Stadium will be their home field until 1973.
- December 30, 1956: the Giants defeat the Chicago Bears in the NFL Championship Game, a 47–7 rout.
- July 20, 1957: the Rev. Billy Graham holds a prayer service attended by over 100,000 people, including vice-president Richard Nixon.
- October 10, 1957: the Milwaukee Braves defeat the Yankees 5–0 to win the 1957 World Series, four games to three.
- December 28, 1958: the Baltimore Colts defeat the Giants in the now-legendary NFL championship game, 23–17 in overtime. It has been called by many "The Greatest Game Ever Played".
- June 26, 1959: Undisputed Heavyweight Champion Floyd Patterson is knocked out by challenger Ingemar Johansson.

== 1960s ==
- November 20, 1960: In a play often referred to simply as The Hit, Philadelphia Eagles linebacker and future Pro Football Hall of Famer Chuck Bednarik makes a hard-hitting tackle that knocks out New York Giants running back and fellow future Hall of Famer Frank Gifford in the Eagles' 17–10 win over the Giants. Gifford ended up missing the remainder of the 1960 NFL season and all of the 1961 NFL season as a result of the hit, while the Eagles went on to win the 1960 NFL championship.
- October 1, 1961: Yankees player Roger Maris hits his 61st home run of the season, surpassing Babe Ruth for most home runs in a single season.
- December 15, 1962: 6,166 attend the final Gotham Bowl, seeing Nebraska defeat Miami, 36–24. It is the final college football bowl game to be played in New York until 2010.
- December 30, 1962: the Green Bay Packers defeat the Giants 16–7 in the NFL Championship game.
- May 22, 1963: Yankees player Mickey Mantle hits a home run off of Bill Fischer that hits the top of the facade on the right field roof, the closest verifiable instance of a home run ball nearly exiting the Stadium.
  Hall of Famer Sandy Koufax
- October 2, 1963: in Game 1 of the 1963 World Series, Los Angeles Dodgers pitcher Sandy Koufax records a then-record 15 strikeouts against the Yankees.
- October 4, 1965: Pope Paul VI celebrates Mass at the Stadium.
- June 10, 1966: Beach Boys in concert
- May 14, 1967: Yankees player Mickey Mantle hits his 500th career home run.
- August 29, 1967: The longest game (by innings) ever played at Yankee Stadium occurs, when the Yankees record a 20-inning 4–3 victory over their biggest rivals, the Boston Red Sox.
- June 8, 1969: the Yankees retire the uniform number 7 of Mickey Mantle on Mickey Mantle Day. Mantle is presented with a plaque by Joe DiMaggio to hang on the center field fence, and Mantle presents DiMaggio with his plaque. These are the last plaques to be placed in play prior to the stadium's renovation.

== 1970s ==
- September 23, 1973: In the last National Football League game at the stadium, the Giants and Philadelphia Eagles play to a 23–23 tie.
- September 30, 1973: the Detroit Tigers defeat the Yankees 8–5 in the final game prior to the stadium's renovation.
- April 15, 1976: The renovated Yankee Stadium is re-opened with an 11–4 Yankee win over the Minnesota Twins.
- May 2, 1976: The NASL's New York Cosmos begin their only season playing soccer at Yankee Stadium with a 2–1 loss to the Chicago Sting, in front of 28,536 fans. Pelé scored their only goal in the game.
- September 28, 1976: with police officers demonstrating outside the stadium as a part of a labor action, Muhammad Ali comes from behind to defeat Ken Norton. It is the last boxing match to be staged at Yankee Stadium.
- October 14, 1976: Yankees player Chris Chambliss hits a "walk-off" home run to win Game 5 of the 1976 American League Championship Series by a score of 7–6 and clinch a World Series berth for the Yankees. As Chambliss rounded the bases, thousands of fans stormed the field in celebration, impeding Chambliss' trip to home plate.
- October 21, 1976: the Cincinnati Reds defeat the Yankees 7–2 to win the 1976 World Series, four games to none.
- October 18, 1977: the Yankees defeat the Los Angeles Dodgers 8–4 to win the 1977 World Series, four games to two. Reggie Jackson hits three home runs on three consecutive pitches, including a third home run that reached "the black" section in the center field bleachers.
- August 6, 1979: in a nationally televised game, the Yankees defeat the Baltimore Orioles 5–4. The game was the same day as the funeral for departed Yankees captain Thurman Munson. The team attended the funeral in Canton, Ohio earlier in the day and flew to New York for an emotional game. Bobby Murcer drove in all five runs for the Yankees, including a "walk-off" two-run single.
- October 2, 1979: during the first of his many Pastoral Trips during his Papacy, Pope John Paul II celebrates Mass at the Stadium for World Justice and Peace.

== 1980s ==
- October 28, 1981: the Los Angeles Dodgers defeat the Yankees 9–2 to win the 1981 World Series, four games to two.
- July 4, 1983: Yankees pitcher Dave Righetti throws a no-hitter against the Boston Red Sox. He is the first Yankee to pitch a no hitter since 1956.
- July 24, 1983: the Pine Tar Incident involving Kansas City Royals player George Brett occurs. Brett hit a "go-ahead" home run in the eighth inning of the game to give the Royals a 5–4 lead. Billy Martin protested that Brett's bat had too much pine tar on it. The umpires overturned the home run and ruled Brett out, resulting in him furiously charging out of the dugout. The Royals' protest of the game was eventually upheld. The game was resumed at Yankee Stadium on August 18 in front of a crowd estimated at 1200.
- June 26, 1988 the Beach Boys perform a concert at Yankee Stadium.
- July 4, 1989 the Beach Boys return to Yankee Stadium.

== 1990s ==
- June 21, 1990: Nelson Mandela is welcomed by 80,000 people at the beginning of an 11-day tour of the United States, after being released from prison in South Africa.
- June 22, 1990: Billy Joel becomes the first artist to perform a rock concert at Yankee Stadium. The performance was released on VHS/DVD.
- August 29, 1992: U2 perform in concert on their Zoo TV Tour, with select footage from the performance appearing in the band's music video "Who's Gonna Ride Your Wild Horses".
- September 4, 1993: Yankees pitcher Jim Abbott throws a no-hitter against the Cleveland Indians.
- June 10–11: 1994: Pink Floyd perform in concert for two shows, the final concerts at the stadium.
- May 14, 1996: Yankees pitcher Dwight Gooden throws a no-hitter against the Seattle Mariners.
- October 9, 1996: in Game 1 of the 1996 American League Championship Series between the Yankees and Baltimore Orioles, Derek Jeter hits a controversial home run. Jeter hit a fly ball to right field towards Orioles outfielder Tony Tarasco, but a fan named Jeffrey Maier reached over the outfield fence to catch the ball, interfering with Tarasco's ability to catch it. The umpires ruled it to be a home run, which tied the game. Bernie Williams would later hit a "walk-off" home run in the eleventh inning to win the game for the Yankees, 5–4.
- October 26, 1996: the Yankees defeat the Atlanta Braves 3–2 to win the 1996 World Series, four games to two. The title is the Yankees' first since 1978.
- May 17, 1998: Yankees pitcher David Wells throws a perfect game against the Minnesota Twins.
- July 18, 1999: Yankees pitcher David Cone throws a perfect game against the Montreal Expos; the first interleague perfect game since Don Larsen's perfect game in the 1956 World Series. Coincidentally, it occurs on "Yogi Berra Day", with a pregame ceremony featuring Don Larsen throwing out the first ball, with Berra catching; Berra caught Larsen's perfect game in 1956.
- October 27, 1999: the Yankees defeat the Atlanta Braves 4–0 to win the 1999 World Series, four games to none. It is the second consecutive title the Yankees have swept and overall, dating back to the 1996 World Series, the twelfth straight World Series game the Yankees have won.

== 2000s ==
- September 23, 2001: A memorial service, titled "Prayer for America", is held at Yankee Stadium to remember the victims of the September 11 attacks.
- October 30, 2001: Before Game 3 of the 2001 World Series, President George W. Bush threw out the ceremonial first pitch. He is the first President since Dwight D. Eisenhower in 1956 to throw out a ceremonial first pitch at the World Series.
- October 31, 2001: in Game 4 of the 2001 World Series, Tino Martinez hits a game-tying home run off Arizona Diamondbacks closer Byung-hyun Kim with two outs in the bottom of the ninth inning. Derek Jeter hits the winning walk-off home run in the tenth inning to win the game 4–3.
- November 1, 2001: Game 5 of the 2001 World Series is the first World Series game to begin in November. In an ending similar to the previous game, Scott Brosius of the Yankees hits a game-tying home run off Byung-hyun Kim with two outs in the bottom of the ninth inning. Alfonso Soriano hits a game-winning single in the twelfth inning to win the game for the Yankees, 3–2.
- June 11, 2003: six pitchers from the Houston Astros combine to no-hit the Yankees. It is the first time that the Yankees had been no-hit at Yankee Stadium since 1952. It also establishes a Major League record for the most pitchers combining to no-hit an opponent.
- October 16, 2003: in Game 7 of the 2003 American League Championship Series between the Yankees and Boston Red Sox, the Yankees rally in the eighth inning off Red Sox pitcher Pedro Martinez to tie the score after trailing 5–2. After Yankee pitcher Mariano Rivera threw three shutout innings of relief, Aaron Boone hit a "walk-off" home run in the eleventh inning to clinch the series and send the Yankees to the World Series.
- October 25, 2003: the Florida Marlins defeat the Yankees, 2–0, to win the 2003 World Series, four games to two.
- October 20, 2004: in Game 7 of the 2004 American League Championship Series, the Boston Red Sox defeat the Yankees 10–3 to become the first team in Major League history to win a seven-game series after losing the first three games.
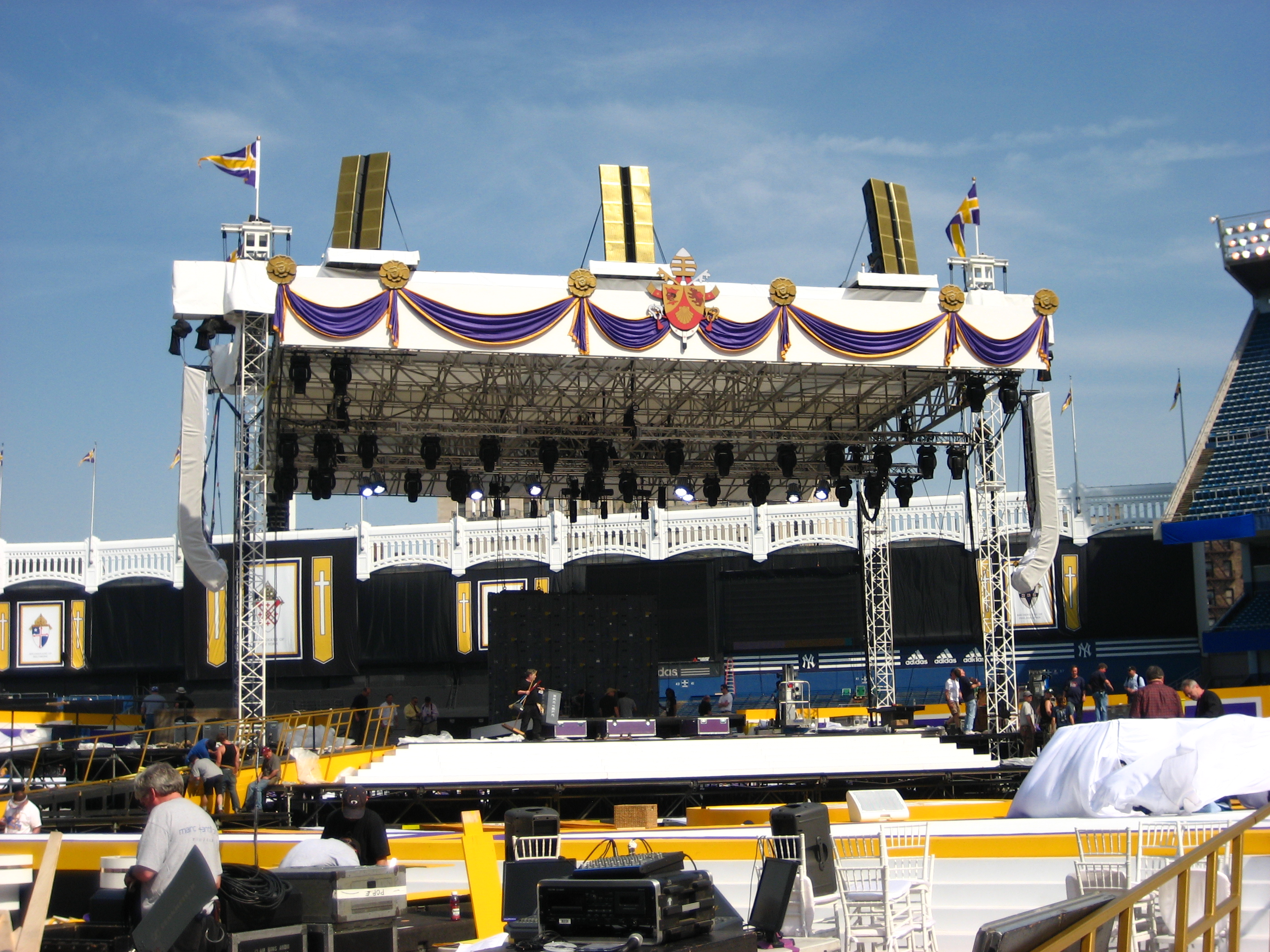
  The stage for Pope Benedict XVI's mass at Yankee Stadium
- April 20, 2008: Pope Benedict XVI leads Mass at Yankee Stadium celebrating the bicentennial of the Archdiocese of New York.
- July 14, 2008: the 2008 Major League Baseball Home Run Derby takes place. Josh Hamilton hits a record 28 home runs in the first round of the competition, drawing chants of his name from the Yankee Stadium crowd. Justin Morneau defeats Hamilton in the final round of the competition.
- July 15, 2008: the 2008 Major League Baseball All-Star Game takes place. The American League defeats the National League 4–2 in 15 innings, after Michael Young hits the game-winning sacrifice fly. The game was the longest All-Star Game in history, lasting 4 hours and 50 minutes, while the 15 innings tied the previous All-Star Game record.
- September 21, 2008: the Yankees defeat the Baltimore Orioles 7–3 in the last baseball game in Yankee Stadium history. In pregame ceremonies, former Yankees players were honored and took their positions on field. Babe Ruth's daughter threw out the ceremonial first pitch. José Molina hit the final home run while Mariano Rivera threw the final pitch in the stadium's history. After the game, the Yankees gathered in the infield while Derek Jeter made a speech to honor the fans' support of the team.

== See also ==
- Timeline of the Bronx
- Timeline of New York City
