= Douglas Mathewson =

American politician (1870–1948)

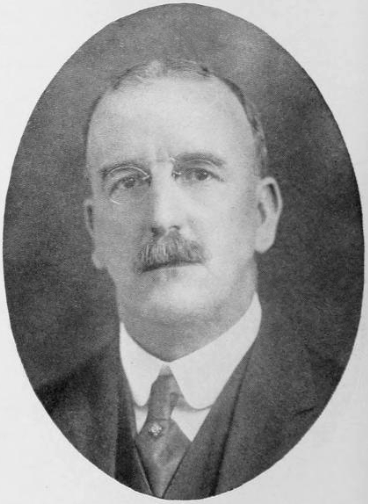

4th Borough President of The Bronx
- In office January 1, 1914 – December 31, 1917
- Preceded by: Cyrus C. Miller
- Succeeded by: Henry Bruckner

Personal details
- Born: January 27, 1870 Manhattan, New York City, US
- Died: September 24, 1948 (aged 78) The Bronx, New York City, US
- Resting place: Kensico Cemetery in Valhalla, New York
- Party: Republican
- Spouse: Mary Dillingham Emery
- Children: 3
- Occupation: real estate lawyer
- Profession: attorney

Douglas Mathewson (January 27, 1870 – September 24, 1948) was an American lawyer and politician from New York who served as the Bronx borough president in (1914-1917)

== Life ==
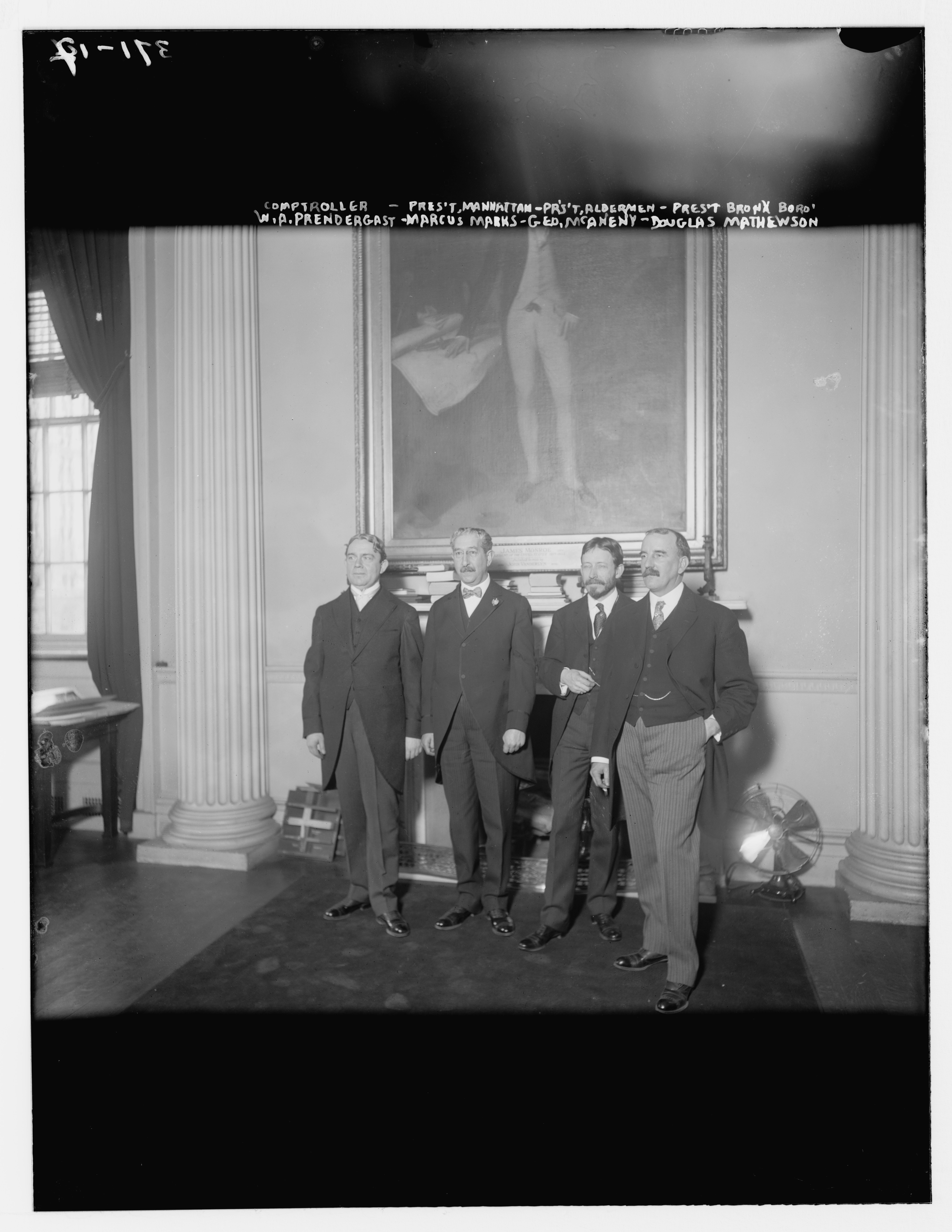
Douglas Mathewson, (on the right) and fellow politicians (from left to right): William A. Prendergast, Marcus M. Marks, George McAneny

Mathewson was born on January 27, 1870, in New York City. He moved to Nyack with his parents when he was young and finished school at the local Union Free School. He returned to New York City in 1884 and worked in the Methodist Book Concern while attending the Evening High School 13th Street. In 1887, he began working as a clerk for John Hardy and studied law under him. He was admitted to the bar in 1891, and continued working with Hardy. He worked as a real estate lawyer and had offices on 265 Broadway and 709 Tremont Avenue. In 1896, he was elected to the New York State Assembly as a Republican, representing the New York County 35th District. He served in the Assembly in 1897.

Mathewson lived in the Bronx since he was 16. In 1902, he was appointed assistant corporation counsel, with supervision of the Bronx law department, under George L. Rives. In 1910, he was appointed First Deputy New York City Comptroller.

In 1913, Mathewson was elected Borough President of the Bronx. He served in the position from 1914 to 1917. In 1933, he was again appointed First Deputy New York City Comptroller. He retired from the office in 1934 and returned to his private law practice. His law office was on 92 Liberty Street.

In 1905, Mathewson married Mary Dillingham Emery. Their three sons were Douglas E., William Glen, Alan Hardy.

Mathewson died at St. Barnabas Hospital on September 24, 1948. He was buried in Kensico Cemetery.

New York State Assembly
Preceded by Arthur C. Butts	New York State Assembly; New York County, 35th District; 1897	Succeeded by Richard H. Mitchell
Political offices
Preceded by Cyrus C. Miller	Borough President of the Bronx; 1914–1917	Succeeded by Henry Bruckner
