= James J. Lyons =

American politician

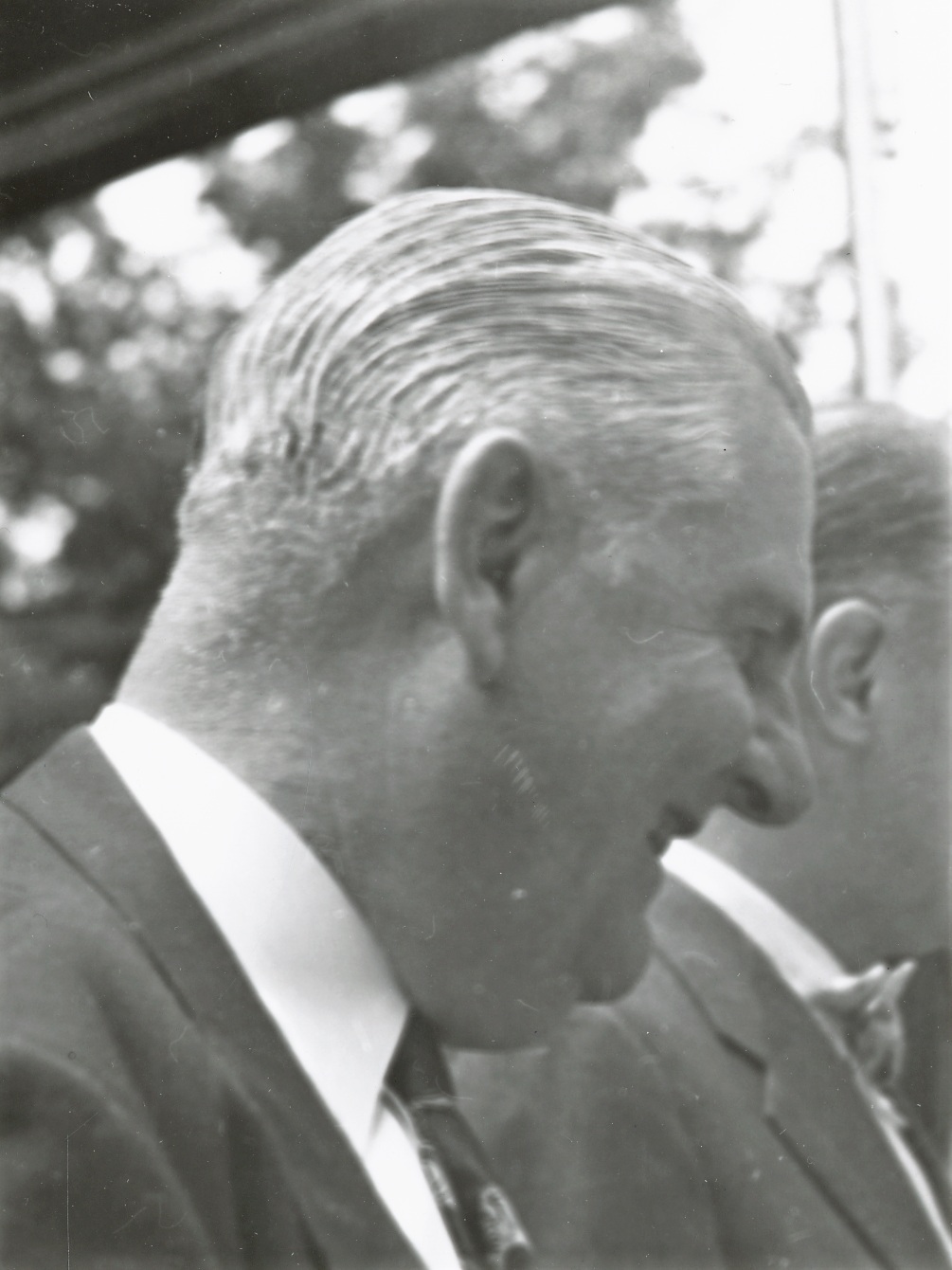

6th Borough President of The Bronx
- In office January 1, 1934 – January 2, 1962
- Preceded by: Henry Bruckner
- Succeeded by: Joseph F. Periconi

Personal details
- Born: February 12, 1890 Ukrainian Village, Manhattan, New York City, U.S.
- Died: January 7, 1966 (aged 75) New York City, U.S.
- Party: Democratic
- Occupation: Salesman

James J. Lyons (February 12, 1890 – January 7, 1966) was an American Democratic Party politician, who served as Borough President of the Bronx from 1934–1962.

== Early life ==
James Lyons was born in Manhattan's old Ninth Ward, in the Ukrainian Village neighborhood. His father was in the produce business and the family decided to move to the Bronx when Lyons was 3. He once reminisced in an interview that he used to drive a pony and a cart under High Bridge and sell fruit to the locals. When he graduated from Public School 11 at age 13, he went to go work as an office boy in the office of the Surpass Leather Company. He would later regret not staying in school and graduating from High School. He eventually moved his way up in the ranks of the company and became a Salesman. Lyons told his men that with the right approach, anything could be sold to anyone. To drive his point home, in his career he sold enough leather to cover four million pairs of women's feet.

== Political career ==
Lyons was president of the Bronx Grand Jurors Association and only moderately interested in politics. When he got a call from the Bronx Democratic Party leader, Edward J. Flynn, in 1932 asking him to become the Democrats' nomination for the Borough President, he was shocked. But he went on to run for the position and won overwhelmingly in the heavily Democratic Borough. Eventually he would go on to be Borough President for seven terms.

Lyons once stated that being a politician in New York City was like being in business, and New York was like a corporation. He ran his office like a tight ship, but was known to have a humorous side. It was his ability to combine the responsibilities of being in charge with being humorous that made him able to never lose an election in his life. He was annoyed that the comedians of the time only had to mention the Bronx to get a laugh. This was because most people only thought the Bronx was good for its famous Bronx Cheer. He devised a plan to call the Bronx the "Borough of Universities" and to play up that the Bronx Cheer came from the hospitality of the founders of the Bronx, instead of the common idea that it was just the attitude of the unsociable people of the Bronx. He was once chided by Deputy Mayor Henry Curran for using the word contact as a verb. He then decided he would set up the "Henry Curran University" in order to correct all grammar mistakes made in the city, in an effort to mock the Deputy Mayor. Lyons had his people send grammar corrections to all of the politicians in the city when they made mistakes. At one point he got the New York City Police Chief to apologize for putting up signs that were not incorrect. Despite these lighter moments in office, Lyons was a very hard worker. He would attend up to 10 meetings a night, and was always present at the opening of a new institution in the Bronx. When Long Beach Airport was being built in Queens, Lyons was instrumental in getting it to be named after Mayor Fiorello La Guardia.

In 1914 the unused bend of the Harlem River was filled in, physically connecting Marble Hill, a part of Manhattan, to the borough of The Bronx. The result of the filling-in was the Spuyten Duyvil Creek, now the main channel connecting the Harlem River to the Hudson River. In 1939, when a judge found Marble Hill to be legally still a part of the borough of Manhattan (and the County of New York), Lyons declared it "the Bronx Sudetenland", referencing Hitler's 1938 annexation of a region of Czechoslovakia, because he wished it to be part of the Bronx. Lyons had climbed "up on top of a jagged rock outcropping [and] planted the borough’s flag, emblazoned with “Ne cede malis” (Yield not to Evil). Smiling widely to the cameras, he proclaimed that the territory of Marble Hill would hereby be a part of the Bronx."

== Family life ==
In 1917, Lyons wed Gertrude O'Brien, with whom he had his 3 children; James J. Lyons Jr., William Lyons and Gertrude Lyons. It was later known that the reason Lyons never ran for an 8th term was because he overheard a phone conversation from President in which the President said that an "important Federal Position" awaited him at the Capitol.

== See also ==
- Timeline of the Bronx, 20th c.

Political offices
Preceded by Henry Bruckner	Borough President of the Bronx; 1934–1962	Succeeded by Joseph F. Periconi
