= Jacob H. Gilbert =

American politician

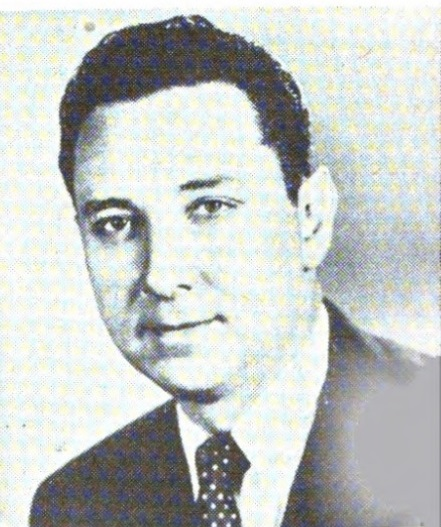

Member of the U.S. House of Representatives from New York
- In office March 8, 1960 – January 3, 1971
- Preceded by: Isidore Dollinger
- Succeeded by: Herman Badillo
- Constituency: 23rd district (1960–63); 22nd district (1963–71)

Personal details
- Born: June 11, 1920 The Bronx, New York, U.S.
- Died: February 27, 1981 (aged 60) The Bronx, New York, U.S.
- Resting place: Mount Hebron Cemetery in Flushing, Queens
- Party: Democratic Party
- Education: St. John's College
- Occupation: Attorney

Jacob Herbert Gilbert (June 17, 1920 – February 27, 1981) was an American lawyer and politician who served six terms as a United States representative from New York between 1960 and 1971.

== Life ==
Gilbert was born on June 17, 1920, in the Bronx, New York City, the eldest of four sons to Rose (née Miller) and Isadore Gilbert, both of whom were Russian Jews. He attended the public schools and graduated from St. John's College and from St. John's University School of Law. He was admitted to the bar in 1944, and practiced law in New York City.

=== Early political career ===
Gilbert was an Assistant Corporation Counsel of New York City from January 1949 to December 1950. He was a member of the New York State Assembly (Bronx Co., 4th D.) from 1951 to 1954, sitting in the 168th and 169th New York State Legislatures. He was a member of the New York State Senate (27th D.) from 1955 to 1960, sitting in the 170th, 171st and 172nd New York State Legislatures.

=== Congress ===
He was elected as a Democrat to the 86th United States Congress, to fill the vacancy caused by the resignation of Isidore Dollinger. He was re-elected to the 87th, 88th, 89th, 90th and 91st United States Congresses, holding office from March 8, 1960, to January 3, 1971.

=== Later career and death ===
Afterward his stint as a congressman, he resumed the practice of law.

He died on February 27, 1981, in the Bronx; and was buried at the Mount Hebron Cemetery in Flushing, Queens.

== See also ==
- List of Jewish members of the United States Congress

New York State Assembly
| Preceded by Joseph Ribustello | New York State Assembly; Bronx County, 4th District; 1951–1954 | Succeeded by Felipe N. Torres |
New York State Senate
| Preceded by Joseph F. Periconi | New York State Senate; 27th District; 1955–1960 | Succeeded by Ivan Warner |
U.S. House of Representatives
| Preceded by Isidore Dollinger | Member of the U.S. House of Representatives from New York's 23rd congressional district 1960–1963 | Succeeded by Charles A. Buckley |
| Preceded by James C. Healey | Member of the U.S. House of Representatives from New York's 22nd congressional district 1963–1971 | Succeeded by Herman Badillo |
