= Green City Market =

U.S. non-profit organization

Coordinates: 41.9267°N 87.6352°W

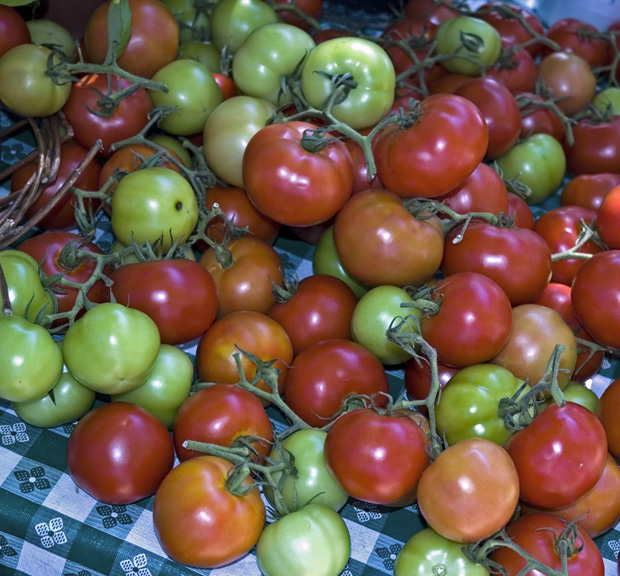
A display of fresh tomatoes at Chicago's Green City Market

The Green City Market is a 501(c)(3) not-for-profit organization that operates a farmers' market in Chicago focusing on local and sustainable farming practices. Green City Market is Chicago's only year-round, sustainable market.

Green City Market was started in 1998 by chef, cookbook author, and Chicago Tribune columnist Abby Mandel.

Green City Market operates as an outdoor market in the south end of Lincoln Park from May through October. From November through April, Green City Market moves into the Peggy Notebaert Nature Museum.

In 2007, Alice Waters listed Green City Market among America's ten best farmers' markets.

== See also ==
- Chicago farmers' markets
