= Stanley Simon =

American politician (1930–2023)

10th Borough President of The Bronx
- In office January 5, 1979 – March 11, 1987
- Preceded by: Robert Abrams
- Succeeded by: Fernando Ferrer

Member of the New York City Council for the 8th district
- In office January 3, 1973 – December 29, 1978
- Preceded by: Bertram Gelfand

Personal details
- Born: March 3, 1930 New York City, U.S.
- Died: August 27, 2023 (aged 93)
- Party: Democratic
- Spouse: Irene Urist (m. 1961)
- Children: 2
- Education: New York University; Brooklyn Law School

Stanley Simon (March 3, 1930 – August 27, 2023) was an American lawyer and politician from New York. From 1979 to 1987, he served as the 10th Borough President of The Bronx. Previously, he served for six years on the New York City Council.

In 1987, he was convicted of Federal racketeering charges along with Rep. Mario Biaggi and Robert Garcia in connection with the Wedtech scandal.

== Early life ==
Simon was born in Manhattan, New York, to a family of Russian Jewish immigrants in 1930. He grew up in Morris Heights, Bronx, where his parents ran a candy store. He graduated from New York University and the Brooklyn Law School.

== Politics ==
Simon became active in politics and held legislative positions as well as becoming a district leader for the Democratic Party in The Bronx. In 1973, he won a seat on the New York City Council to replace Bertram Gelfand, who resigned to become a judge. He was also the head of the Bronx Bar Association during this period.

Throughout his career, he aligned himself with Stanley M. Friedman, a powerful Bronx political figure who had served as deputy mayor under Abraham Beame. Although Friedman held no elective office in his career, he controlled judicial appointments and advanced interests of politicians who supported him. In 1978, Simon supported Friedman in his bid for the head of the Bronx Democratic Party.

The following year, after Bronx Borough President Robert Abrams was elected New York Attorney General, Friedman advanced Simon for the interim post. The eight city council members from the Bronx elected him as the interim President in a racially divided vote. He later won the election in November 1979 to fulfill the remainder of Abrams' term.

Despite a reformist effort to defeat him, he won re-election easily in 1981 over Liberal Party candidate Ismael Betancourt. Betancourt had been supported by former Borough President Herman Badillo but failed to win the party's endorsement. Betancourt was later removed from the Democratic primary ballot leaving him to run on the smaller party's line.

He had a tougher challenge in 1985. With an increasing Latino population in the Bronx, José E. Serrano, a New York assemblyman and future Congressman, came within 4,000 votes of defeating him in the Democratic primary.

=== Conviction ===
In 1987, Simon, aware that he had been under investigation and that charges against him were pending, resigned from his post. A few weeks later, United States Attorney for the Southern District of New York Rudolph Giuliani announced an indictment against him for extortion, perjury, income tax evasion and obstruction of justice in connection after an investigation into Wedtech, a Bronx-based defense contractor. The charges included extorting a job with pay raises for his brother-in-law, extorting the company for campaign contributions, obtaining a kickback in exchange for a job at his office and failure to pay income tax on the money he received. The year before, his benefactor Friedman, was convicted of extortion and bribery and sentenced to 12 years in Federal prison.

He was convicted of racketeering and extortion in 1988 and received a five-year sentence. He served his sentence at Allenwood Federal prison camp. After two years, Judge Constance Baker Motley reduced his sentence, which made him eligible for immediate parole. He left prison in July 1991.

Years later, the archives of Mayor Ed Koch's revealed the late Mayor's uncharitable comments about Simon. In one interview, he called Simon "a fool and a simpleton". Koch also said that "all you had to do was to promise him to upgrade his personal private bathroom at Borough Hall, and he'd vote for anything."

== Personal life and death ==
Simon married Irene Urist in 1961, and they had two daughters. He was a longtime resident of Riverdale, Bronx.

Simon died on August 27, 2023, at the age of 93. His death was not publicly reported until July 2024.

Political offices
Preceded by Robert Abrams	Borough President of the Bronx; January 5, 1979 – March 11, 1987	Succeeded by Fernando Ferrer
