= Joseph F. Periconi =

American politician (1910–1994)

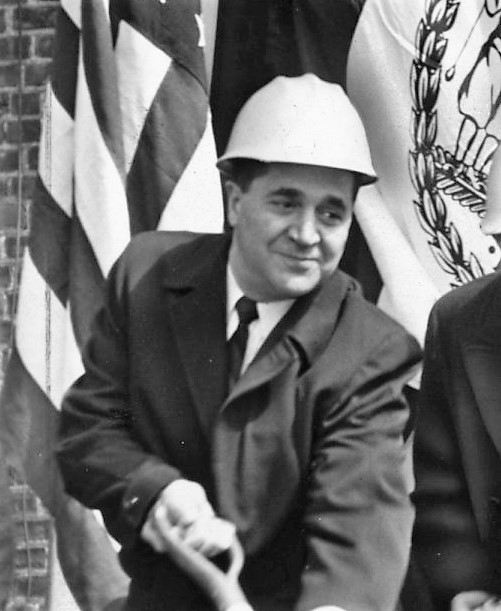
- Bronx Borough President Joseph F. Periconi in Hunts Point in 1962

7th Borough President of The Bronx
- In office January 2, 1962 – December 28, 1965
- Preceded by: James J. Lyons
- Succeeded by: Herman Badillo

Commissioner of the New York City Sanitation Department
- In office January 1, 1966 – November 23, 1966
- Preceded by: Frank J. Lucia
- Succeeded by: Samuel J. Kearing, Jr.

Member of the New York State Senate from the 29th district
- In office 1957–1960
- Preceded by: Francis J. McCaffrey
- Succeeded by: Joseph E. Marine

Member of the New York State Senate from the 27th district
- In office 1953–1954
- Preceded by: Enzo Gaspari
- Succeeded by: Jacob H. Gilbert

Personal details
- Born: July 14, 1910 Manhattan, New York, U.S.
- Died: February 16, 1994 (aged 83) Morris Park, Bronx, New York, U.S.
- Cause of death: cardiac arrest
- Party: Republican
- Children: 4
- Education: St. John's University
- Alma mater: New York Law School
- Profession: attorney

Joseph Francis Periconi (July 14, 1910 – February 16, 1994) was an American politician from New York City in the United States. He was a New York State Senator; and Borough President of the Bronx, to date the last Republican in this office.

== Life ==
He was born on July 14, 1910, in Manhattan, New York City.

Periconi was a member of the New York State Senate (27th D.) in 1953 and 1954. In November 1954, after legislative re-apportionment, he ran in the 29th District for re-election, but was defeated by Democrat Francis J. McCaffrey, the incumbent of the 28th District. In November 1956, Periconi defeated McCaffrey for re-election.

Periconi was again a member of the State Senate (29th D.) from 1957 to 1960, sitting in the 171st and 172nd New York State Legislatures. In 1957, he ran for Borough President of the Bronx, but was defeated by the incumbent Democrat James J. Lyons. On April 14, 1960, Periconi was appointed as a member of the Board of the New York City Transit Authority.

Periconi was Borough President of the Bronx from 1962 to 1965, elected on the Republican and Liberal tickets in 1961. During his time in office, he fought countlessly for the preservation of Bronx Borough Hall as a landmark. In 1965, he was narrowly defeated by Herman Badillo, who was then a Democrat. During Badillo's tenure, the landmark building was demolished.

Periconi was the New York City Department of Sanitation Commissioner from January 1, 1966 to November 23, 1966.

He lost a 1970 election to the US House of Representatives to Mario Biaggi, getting 25% of the vote to Biaggi's 70%.

Periconi died on February 16, 1994, at the Morris Park Nursing Home in the Bronx.

== See also ==
- List of borough presidents of The Bronx
- Timeline of the Bronx

Political offices
Preceded by James J. Lyons	Borough President of the Bronx; 1962–1965	Succeeded by Herman Badillo
New York State Senate
Preceded by Francis J. McCaffrey	New York State Senate; 29th District; 1957–1960	Succeeded by Joseph E. Marine
Preceded by Enzo Gaspari	New York State Senate; 27th District; 1953–1954	Succeeded by Jacob H. Gilbert
