= Fernando Ferrer =

American politician (born 1950)

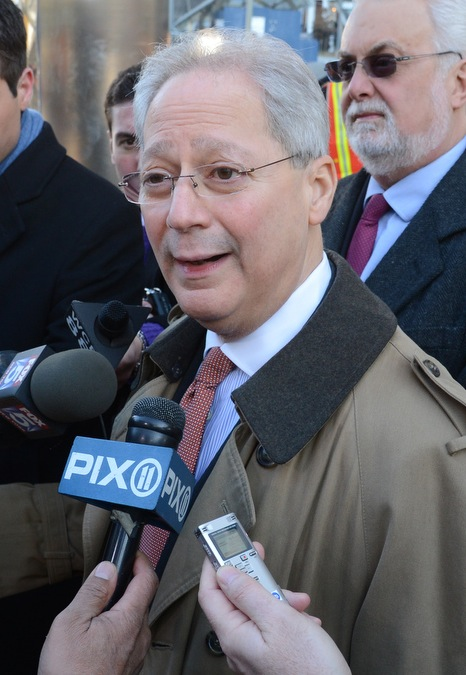

Chairman of the Metropolitan Transportation Authority
- Acting
- In office November 9, 2018 – March 31, 2019
- Preceded by: Joe Lhota
- Succeeded by: Pat Foye
- In office February 1, 2017 – June 20, 2017
- Preceded by: Thomas Prendergast
- Succeeded by: Joe Lhota
- In office January 1, 2013 – June 19, 2013
- Preceded by: Joe Lhota
- Succeeded by: Thomas Prendergast

11th Borough President of The Bronx
- In office April 15, 1987 – December 31, 2001
- Preceded by: Stanley Simon
- Succeeded by: Adolfo Carrión

Personal details
- Born: Fernando James Ferrer; April 30, 1950 (age 76) New York City, New York, U.S.
- Party: Democratic
- Education: New York University (BA); Baruch College (MPA)

Fernando James Ferrer (born April 30, 1950) is an American politician who was the borough president of The Bronx from 1987 to 2001. Ferrer was a candidate for mayor of New York City in 1997 and 2001 and was the Democratic Party nominee for mayor in 2005, when he was defeated by Michael Bloomberg. Ferrer served on the New York City Council in the 1980s and has served as chairman and vice chairman of the Metropolitan Transportation Authority.

== Early life and education ==
Ferrer grew up in the Longwood section of the South Bronx. He graduated from Catholic schools in the Bronx: St. Anselm Elementary School and Cardinal Spellman High School. Ferrer earned his B.A. degree from the University Heights Campus of New York University and his M.P.A. from Baruch College.

== Career ==
=== New York City Council ===
Ferrer represented the former 13 City Council district in the Bronx from 1982 to 1987. Ferrer authored legislation requiring interpreters in city emergency rooms. Ferrer went on to chair the Health Committee, fight for anti-discrimination laws on behalf of gays and lesbians, and lead the fight for a Civilian Complaint Review Board for the NYPD.

=== Bronx Borough President ===
Ferrer was appointed Bronx Borough President as the result of incumbent Stanley Simon's resignation in connection with the Wedtech scandal. In 1987, Simon, aware that he had been under investigation and that charges against him were pending, resigned from his post. Ferrer began his 14-year tenure as Bronx borough president when the borough was a symbol of urban decay and neglect. National attention led to a federal commitment to rebuild. During the Ferrer administration housing was created for about 66,000 families. The borough saw a significant drop in crime, particularly in the South Bronx neighborhood, and a steady rise in business and real estate investment.

=== Campaigns for Mayor of New York City ===
==== 1997 mayoral campaign ====
In 1997, Ferrer launched a campaign for Mayor of New York. Trailing in the polls and under increased pressure from party insiders for a unified Democratic Party, he abruptly dropped out and endorsed the eventual Democratic nominee, Manhattan Borough President Ruth Messinger.

==== 2001 mayoral campaign ====
In the 2001 election, Ferrer ran for the Democratic nomination for mayor. He won the first primary with 34%, but failed to win the necessary 40% to secure the nomination and ultimately lost a divisive runoff election to Mark Green following the September 11th terrorist attack on the World Trade Center towers. Ferrer, who is of Puerto Rican descent, received a high level of support from Hispanic voters but not from African Americans.

==== 2005 mayoral campaign ====
Ferrer was the Democratic candidate for mayor in 2005.

Ferrer's campaign was hurt by remarks he made in March 2005 concerning the Amadou Diallo shooting. Ferrer, who had marched in protest against the shooting when it occurred and had been arrested, expressed his belief to the New York City Police Department Sergeants Benevolent Association that the incident was a "tragedy," but "not a crime." He was strongly criticized by Diallo's family and others for these remarks, and he slid in popularity polls, especially among African Americans.

Ferrer prevailed in the primary election held on September 13, 2005. The first tally indicated that Ferrer garnered 39.95% of the final vote. He needed 40% to avoid a runoff, but Anthony D. Weiner, the second-place finisher, conceded, thus ensuring that Ferrer would advance to the general election. A final count indicated that Ferrer actually received 40.15% of the votes.

Political analyst Fred Siegel summarized Ferrer's campaign as follows:

If anyone doubted the hapless nature of Ferrer's campaign they had only to watch his ads featuring the rotund Reverend Al Sharpton salsa dancing. In Fernando Ferrer's losing bid for mayor, that was about as innovative as things got. The campaign was also plagued by revenue problems as the ads they wished to use were too long and hence too expensive and these "salsa" ads were done to save money but also to hopefully get the campaign some needed attention. Sadly, the focus became Al Sharpton and the others used in these ads rather than the message they tried to convey.

Ferrer's campaign was hurt when the New York Times and other big newspapers endorsed Mike Bloomberg. Also, Ferrer's campaign relied mainly on small contributions, compared to Bloomberg's $96 million from his personal billion dollar fortune.

Bloomberg defeated Ferrer, 58.4%-39.0%, on Election Day. Polls taken just days before had indicated that Ferrer would lose by between 30 and 35 percent.

== Personal life ==
As of 2005, Ferrer resided in the Riverdale section of the Bronx.

== See also ==
- Timeline of the Bronx
- List of Puerto Ricans

Political offices
Preceded by Stephen B. Kaufman	Member of the New York City Council from the 13th district 1983–1987	Succeeded by Jose Rivera
Preceded by Stanley Simon	Borough President of The Bronx; 1987–2001	Succeeded by Adolfo Carrión
Government offices
Preceded by Joe Lhota	Chairman of the Metropolitan Transportation Authority; Acting; 2013	Succeeded by Thomas Prendergast
Preceded by Thomas Prendergast	Chairman of the Metropolitan Transportation Authority; Acting; 2017	Succeeded by Joe Lhota
Preceded by Joe Lhota	Chairman of the Metropolitan Transportation Authority; Acting; 2018–2019	Succeeded by Pat Foye
Party political offices
Preceded by Mark Green	Democratic nominee for Mayor of New York; 2005	Succeeded by Bill Thompson
