= Arthur C. Butts =

American politician (1848–1913)

United States magistrate judge
- In office 1907–1913
- Appointed by: George B. McClellan Jr.

Assistant Corporation Counsel for the New York City Law Department
- In office 1898–1907
- Appointed by: Corporation Counsel John Whalen

New York State Assembly
- In office 1892-1894; 1895-1898

Personal details
- Born: August 23, 1848 New York City, New York, U.S.
- Died: October 12, 1913 (aged 65) Westbrook, Connecticut, U.S.
- Party: Democratic Party
- Spouse: Tinnie Smith (m. 1878)
- Children: 3

Arthur Clarkson Butts (August 23, 1848 – October 12, 1913) was an American lawyer, judge, and politician from New York.

== Early life ==
Butts was born on August 23, 1848, in New York City, New York, the son of Rev. Joshua Butts and Susan Underhill. He attended school in New York City until 1859, and from 1864 to 1866 he went to the Delaware Literary Institute in Franklin, New York.

== Career ==
Butts studied law with Senator Henry R. Low in Monticello and in New York City. He was admitted to the bar in 1869, and in 1870 he began practicing law in Monticello. He was defense consul to four murder trials while practicing law there, only losing in the 1875 Mark Brown case. In 1884, he moved to New York City and settled in the Twenty-third Ward (later part of the Bronx). There, he was active in the movement to elect Louis J. Heintz Commissioner of Street Improvements for the Twenty-third and Twenty-fourth Wards, a consul for the Citizens Committee that urged passage of the People's Bill, and chairman of the Executive Committee of the Citizens' Local Improvement Party in 1891. In 1872, he was elected special county judge and surrogate of Sullivan County. He served in that position from 1873 to 1876.

Butts held some business offices, serving as president of the Rapid Unloader and Equipment Company and secretary and treasurer of the Drake and Stratton Company. In 1892, he was elected to the New York State Assembly as a Democrat, representing the New York County 29th District. He served in the Assembly in 1893 (when he presented bills that provided for a uniform five-cents fare for passengers on both the Suburban and Manhattan elevated railways, appropriated $200,000 a year for five years to improve parks in the New York City Twenty-third and Twenty-fourth Wards, created a State Board of Appropriations to learn what appropriations should and shouldn't be made, and involved devising real property and appointing referees) and 1894 (when he again introduced a bill to provide for a uniform five-cents fare and introduced bills to abolish the Rapid Transit Commission and construct a new bridge over the Harlem River from First Avenue to Willis Avenue). He lost the 1894 re-election to Republican Alonzo Bell. He was re-elected back to the Assembly in 1895, now representing the New York County 35th District, and served in the Assembly in 1896.

In 1898, Corporation Counsel John Whalen appointed Butts an Assistant Corporation Counsel. He represented the Corporation Counsel in Albany and served under Corporation Counsels Whalen, John J. Delany, and William B. Ellison. In 1907, Mayor George B. McClellan Jr. appointed him to a ten-year term as Magistrate to succeed Magistrate Baker. Within a week of becoming Magistrate, he began instituting reforms to police court procedure, like issuing only warrants instead of summons and replacing the "lineup" of prisoners and complainants before the judicial desk with only seeing one prisoner before him at a time. He was criticized for his reforms by lawyers who practiced before him, and fellow Magistrates held a meeting in protest of his refusal to recognize summons they issued. He also criticized the police for trivial arrests, like a crusade against subway smokers in 1912.

== Personal life ==
In 1878, Butts married Tinnie Smith. Their children were Dr. Arthur C. Jr., Mrs. Florence Human, and Susan H. Butts died at his country home in Westbrook, Connecticut, on October 12, 1913.

New York State Assembly
Preceded by District Created	New York State Assembly; New York County, 29th District; 1893–1894	Succeeded by Alonzo Bell
Preceded by District Created	New York State Assembly; New York County, 35th District; 1896	Succeeded by Douglas Mathewson
