= John F. Murray (politician) =

American politician (1862–1928)

Second Borough President of The Bronx
- In office August 29, 1909 – December 31, 1909
- Preceded by: Louis F. Haffen
- Succeeded by: Cyrus C. Miller

Personal details
- Born: 1862
- Died: December 31, 1928
- Party: Democratic

John F. Murray (1862 – December 31, 1928) was the Commissioner of Public Works in The Bronx, New York, and the second Bronx borough president. He became acting borough president in August 1909 upon the removal of Louis F. Haffen by New York Governor Charles Evans Hughes. He was then elected interim borough president for the remainder of Haffen's term by a unanimous vote of the eight men representing The Bronx on the New York City Board of Aldermen. At the time Murray was the Commissioner of Public Works. Murray did not run for election in November 1909 for a full term as borough president, and was succeeded by Cyrus C. Miller.

Murray suffered from Bright's disease and anemia for about a year before dying on December 31, 1928 in a Metropolitan Life Insurance Company sanitarium in Mount McGregor, New York.

== See also ==
- Timeline of the Bronx

Political offices
Preceded by Louis F. Haffen	Borough President of The Bronx; 1909	Succeeded by Cyrus C. Miller
