= Bronx Press-Review =

American weekly newspaper

- Type: Weekly newspaper
- Owner: Metro North Media
- Publisher: Andrew Wolf
- Editor: Andrew Wolf
- Founded: 1940; 86 years ago
- Language: English
- Country: United States

The Bronx Press-Review is a weekly newspaper published in the Bronx, New York. The newspaper was established in 1940, and it remains the longest-publishing weekly newspaper in the Bronx. The Bronx Press-Review is a borough-wide newspaper that covers local news, politics, and community events. It publishes editorials and letters to the editor from readers. It used to be sold on newsstands and available through paid subscription. In the late 1990s, it became a free newspaper that is available through vending machines and distributed in public places such as banks and libraries. Since the newspaper is free, it relies on exclusively on advertising and classified ads for revenue.

In 1993, publisher Myron Garfinkle sold the Bronx Press-Review to Jerry Finkelstein's News Communications (which is not to be confused with Rupert Murdoch's News Corporation). The same year, the newspaper's new editor-in-chief, Andrew Wolf, began publishing a sister weekly, the Riverdale Review, which directly competes with the Riverdale Press.

In 1997, both the Bronx-Press Review and the Riverdale Review began posting their weekly content online, making them among the first Bronx newspapers to publish on the Internet. However, declining revenues forced both newspapers to discontinue their Web sites in 2003.

In 2000, Wolf's Metro North Media purchased both newspapers from News Communications. Wolf remains the publisher and editor-in-chief.
