= Riverdale Review =

American newspaper

- Type: newspaper
- Owner: Metro North Media
- Publisher: Andrew Wolf
- Editor: Andrew Wolf
- Founded: 1993; 33 years ago
- Language: English
- Country: United States

The Riverdale Review was a newspaper serving the Riverdale section of the Bronx in New York City. It was published by the Metro North Media Group, which also published the weekly Bronx Press-Review. It is uncertain when these newspapers ceased publishing, but probably some time in 2017.

The Riverdale Review was initially launched in 1993 by publisher Andrew Wolf as an alternative to the Pulitzer Prize-winning Riverdale Press, the other local paper. There are several differences the casual observer can note between the publications. A few of these include: while the Press costs $1.00, the Review is free; the Press tends toward taking a more liberal position on local and city politics than the Review; the Review is in tabloid format; the Review sometimes has a political cartoon. Both newspapers were widely read in the community and influence local debate.

Publisher Andrew Wolf also wrote a column focusing primarily on city education issues for the New York Sun until that paper's demise in September, 2008, however he continues to occasionally write for the Sun's website and is an occasional blogger for the Huffington Post. Wolf's columns for the Sun as well as editorials for the Riverdale Review can be viewed at Andywolf.net .
