= Crescent City Farmers Market =

Crescent City Farmers Market is an agricultural market in New Orleans, Louisiana. Started as a single weekly farmers market in 1995, it is now a rotating series of markets spaced in neighborhoods throughout the city.

== Early market development ==
The French and later the Spanish colonial governments followed these European practices in New Orleans. Under the French, market activity began on the levee, where ships would dock at the riverbank and sell produce, meat, and other provisions in the open-air.

In 1779, soon after the Spaniards assumed control of New Orleans, they constructed the city's first market building (the French Market), thus putting an end to the practice of the levee-street corner markets. While protecting consumers from high prices and poor quality food, the establishment of the French Market also provided the Spanish government with increased control over local commerce.

From this, a network of municipal public markets was born. It survived numerous administrations: Spanish, American, Confederate, and lastly American. It thrived throughout the nineteenth and into the twentieth century. By the First World War, there were thirty-two markets scattered throughout the city, with at least one in every neighborhood.

== Market culture ==
With names like Memory, Suburban, Le Breton, Lautenschlaeger, Prytania, and Tremé, the markets not only served as economic engines in their neighborhoods, but also reflected the cultural dynamics of the neighborhoods and the metropolitan area. At the end of the nineteenth century, immigration through the port of New Orleans matched that of New York and San Francisco in sheer numbers and diversity. For many immigrants, the public market provided them with an entry point into the economy as small-scale entrepreneurs. Many of the city's corner groceries and food processors began as stalls at the public markets. Shoppers would have to be prepared to conduct business in many languages. The prevailing languages were French, Creole Patois, various African languages, English, Spanish, German, Gaelic, Choctaw, Greek, Maltese, and Italian. Stall rents were low and shoppers were plentiful. Cheesemongers, fishmongers, butchers, and greengrocers provided New Orleans shoppers with basic necessities – calas tout chauds (fried cakes), pralines, estomac mulâtre (gingerbread), filé powder (for gumbo), and po' boy sandwiches.

Sicilian truck farmers from St. Bernard Parish carted in crops like creole artichokes, tomatoes, garlic, and fava beans. Hunters would bring in everything from raccoons, bears, and possums to songbirds. Coastal fishermen – many originally from the Canary Islands, China, and Croatia – would market oysters, shrimp, crawfish, and a wide selection of fish. Painter John James Audubon noted in his journal his surprise at finding “a Barred Owl, cleaned and exposed, for sale at twenty-five cents.”

Over time, the spin-off businesses from the markets began to circulate throughout the city. For residents who could not get to market, they could purchase yard fresh eggs, strawberries, milk, and prepared foods like fried oysters right from their doorsteps. Roving street vendors would make regular rounds through neighborhoods, singing songs announcing their products, while others offered services, like scissors grinding, chimney sweeping, and tin smithery.

== Recent history ==
After the Second World War, the City of New Orleans began to privatize many of the older public markets, which had begun to fall into disrepair during the Great Depression. The Works Progress Administration era of the 1930s was a time of growth for public markets, with many new ones constructed during this period. However, with significant demographic shifts to the suburbs, the neighborhood markets lost their customers and then their vendors. Throughout the city, scattered remnants of the public market system remain. Some have been transformed into commercial businesses, while others remain vacant or were torn down. The nation's oldest continuously running public market – The French Market – remains open for business. In the heart of the Vieux Carré, it continues to draw large crowds to its weekend flea market, restaurants, and world-famous coffee stand — Café du Monde. Prior to Hurricane Katrina in 2005, the St. Roch Fish Market continued to serve gumbo.

== Crescent City Farmers Market ==
During the decade from 1995 to 2005, there was a resurgence of public markets in New Orleans. The Crescent City Farmers Market was established through a "community-wide collaboration between Loyola University, the City of New Orleans, the William B. Reily Company and a host of citizens," and grew from one day of operation a week in one neighborhood to operating in four neighborhoods: the Warehouse District, Uptown Square, Mid City, and the French Quarter. and kicked off traveling seafood markets called White Boot Brigades in 2004, which brought commercial shrimpers into neighborhoods craving fresh foods. In the wake of the success of the open-air farmers market model, neighborhood associations and enterprising neighborhood activists developed art markets in Bywater and Mid City, which marketumbrella.org added to with its Festivus (held every December on first 3 Sundays), which brought a sense of fun to the urban holiday shopping experience (along with fair trade, recycled and artisanal goods). In 2006, with the city and region desperately attempting to rebuild after the wreckage and disruptions from Hurricanes Katrina and Rita, two of the Crescent City Farmers Markets reopened and started providing the city with local, fresh food, artisanal goods as well as a warm, friendly town square. Across the river from New Orleans, the Gretna Farmers Market opened in October 2006 with an open-air farmers market in its historic courthouse plaza.

== See also ==
- Project for Public Spaces
