= Chattanooga Market =

Tennessee arts and crafts and farmers' market

Coordinates: 35.036756°N 85.316981°W

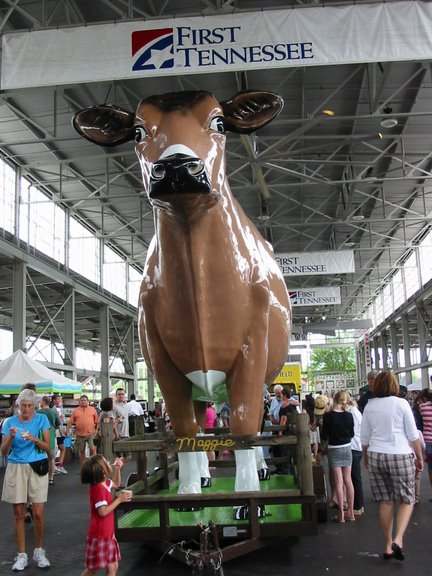
Maggie the Mayfield cow at the Chattanooga Market.

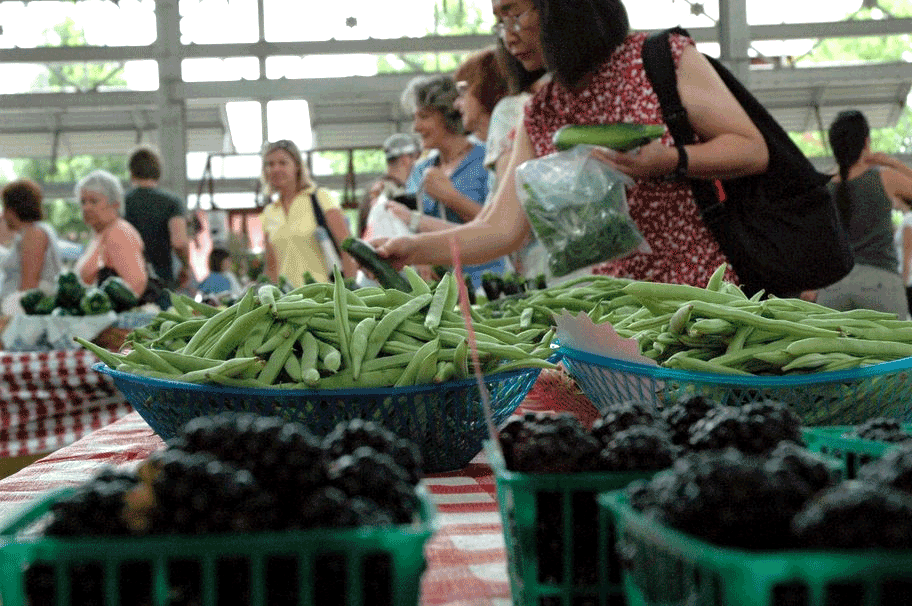
Shoppers inspect farm-fresh produce at the Chattanooga Market.

The Chattanooga Market is the region's largest producer-only arts and crafts and farmers' market. It is held every Sunday from April to December at the open-air First Horizon Pavilion in Chattanooga, Tennessee, typically from 11am until 4pm (hours can vary for special events). The market has over 300 vendors, and attracts an audience of 6,000 visitors each weekend; admission is free.

== History ==
The market was founded in 2001 by Nick & Elizabeth Jessen, who modeled it after the Saturday Market in Eugene, Oregon. In 2008, the market announced it was closing due to "not reaching a point of independent operation" but was quickly sold and reopened by a new management team.

All items sold at the Chattanooga Market are required to be handmade, grown, created or otherwise the direct efforts of the person selling it, and a review panel reviews each new item against a minimum standard of quality prior to sale to the public.

The Chattanooga Market is a non-profit organization to promote local farming, community events & small business development.

== Events ==
The Chattanooga Market features a new event theme each weekend, ranging from Bluegrass music days to Oktoberfest celebrations, from celebrity chef cooking competitions to Holiday Market, its art-centric season finale. A new event schedule is published each year, and does vary from year-to-year.
