= List of Farmers Markets in Indiana =

This is a list of local Farmers Markets in Indiana

== Greater Indianapolis Area ==
Name	Location	Availability
Broad Ripple Farmers Market	Broad Ripple High School Indianapolis	Saturdays Seasonally: May through October
Broad Ripple Winter Market	Bent Rail Brewery Indianapolis	Saturdays Seasonally: November through April
Carmel Farmers Market	City Center Carmel	Saturdays Seasonally: May through October
The Farmer & The Flea Outdoor Market	Downtown Indianapolis	Saturdays Seasonally: June 5 through October 30
Indianapolis Market Wagon	Virtual/Web-Based	Thursdays Year-Round
Original Farmers Market	City Market Indianapolis	Wednesdays Seasonally: May through October
The Market at Hague	Lawrence North High School Indianapolis	Saturdays Seasonally: May through October
Zionsville Farmers Market	Main & Hawthorne Zionsville	Saturdays Seasonally: May through October

== Greater Lafayette Area ==
Name	Location	Availability
Lafayette Farmers Market	5th Street & Main Lafayette	Saturdays Seasonally: May through October
Purdue Farmers Market	Purdue Memorial Mall West Lafayette	Thursdays Seasonally: May through October
West Lafayette Farmers Market	Cumberland Park West Lafayette	Wednesdays Seasonally: May through October

== Evansville / Tri-State Area ==
Name	Location	Availability
Evansville Farmers Market	US Incubator 815 John St. Evansville	Saturdays Seasonally: May through September
Evansville Market Wagon	Virtual/Web-Based	Thursdays Year-Round
Newburgh Farmers Market	1 East Water Street Newburgh	Saturdays Seasonally: May through September

== Fort Wayne ==
Name	Location	Availability
Ft. Wayne's Farmers Market	Wayne & Barr Street Evansville	Saturdays Seasonally: May through October
Fort Wayne Market Wagon	Virtual/Web-Based	Thursdays Year-Round
