= Chicago farmers' markets =

Markets held in Chicago, Illinois

Chicago farmers' markets comprise a mix of seasonal outdoor markets and winter or year-round markets in Chicago, Illinois. They are operated directly by the city's Department of Cultural Affairs and Special Events (DCASE), by community organizations working with the city, and by independent nonprofit organizations and neighborhood chambers of commerce. Offerings vary by market and include regional produce and other farm products, prepared foods, and, at some markets, locally made non-food goods.

The modern municipal program began with the Daley Plaza Farmers Market in 1978. Independent markets founded from the late 1990s onward developed other models, including producer-only markets, chamber-led neighborhood markets, and markets organized around food access and nutrition education.

== History ==
Open-air markets were among Chicago's earliest systems for selling food. Public market halls expanded near the Loop by 1850, but dispersed settlement and the growth of neighborhood grocery stores reduced the importance of central market halls. Supermarkets became the dominant food retailers after World War II. Interest in fresh and locally produced food contributed to a revival of farmers' markets in Chicago in the late 1980s, with a weekly market at Daley Plaza followed by smaller neighborhood markets.

The city traces the Chicago City Markets program to 1978, when the Daley Plaza market opened during the administration of Mayor Michael Bilandic. In 1999, chef and food writer Abby Mandel started Green City Market with nine farmers near the Chicago Theatre. The market developed as a producer-only nonprofit, meaning that participating farmers sell what they grow and other food vendors source directly from the market's farmers when possible.

Chicago started the Logan Square Farmers Market in 2005. The Logan Square Chamber of Commerce became its lead organizer in 2007, and the market developed outdoor and winter operations that made it one of the city's few nearly year-round weekly markets. Experimental Station launched the 61st Street Farmers Market in Woodlawn in 2008 with an emphasis on food access, nutrition education, and support for Midwestern growers. By 2015, Green City, Logan Square, 61st Street, and Glenwood Sunday Market were among the Chicago markets offering indoor winter dates.

== Organization and operation ==
DCASE's Chicago City Markets are one part of a larger system. Its 2017 guidelines counted 17 DCASE markets and approximately 45 independent markets. The city markets, which had begun as produce-only operations in more than 15 communities, had expanded to include prepared foods and locally made artisan products as well as produce, meat, eggs, and dairy goods. For the announced 2026 season, DCASE described a smaller municipal program of two city-run markets and four community-partner markets, alongside approximately 50 independently operated markets with separate applications and schedules.

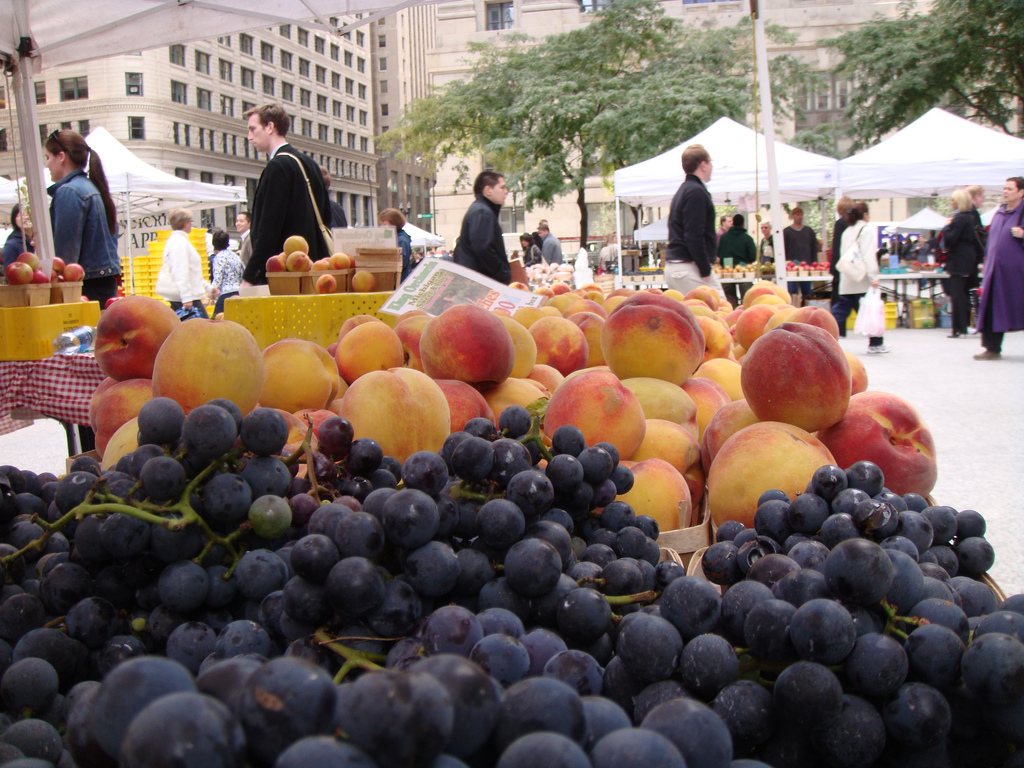
Produce at a downtown Chicago farmers' market

Market dates, hours, and sites are set separately and can change between seasons. Most outdoor operations are concentrated in the regional growing season, while some organizations use indoor sites during winter. City guidelines in 2017 required products sold as farm goods to be locally produced and in season. They also required eligible vendors at DCASE markets to participate in the Illinois LINK program and in farmers-market nutrition programs for women, infants, children, and seniors.

== Major markets ==
Market	Began	Organization and role
Daley Plaza Farmers Market	1978	The founding market of the Chicago City Markets program and its longest-running location, operated by DCASE.
Green City Market	1999	A producer-only nonprofit founded by Abby Mandel. It began near the Chicago Theatre and later operated seasonal markets in Lincoln Park and the West Loop, as well as an indoor market.
Logan Square Farmers Market	2005	Begun by the city and led by the Logan Square Chamber of Commerce from 2007. Its vendors have included farms and food producers from Illinois, Indiana, Michigan, and Wisconsin, and it has operated both outdoor and winter markets.
61st Street Farmers Market	2008	Operated by Experimental Station in Woodlawn, with outdoor and indoor seasons, food education, and programs intended to reduce barriers to buying locally grown food.

== Food access ==
Acceptance of the Illinois LINK card expanded during the 2000s and early 2010s. Only a few city-approved farmers' markets accepted LINK in 2007; by 2011, approximately 20 did. The 61st Street market was an early participant and helped other Chicago markets establish systems for processing the benefit. Since 2009, Experimental Station's Link Up Illinois initiative has provided matching incentives for purchases made with Supplemental Nutrition Assistance Program benefits at participating farmers' markets and other food retailers.

A 2022 study in the journal Preventing Chronic Disease mapped 57 Chicago retailers that offered Link Match during summer 2020; 29 were farmers' markets, with the remainder consisting of mobile market stops, food cooperatives, farm stands, and other community food markets. Link Match retailers were generally closer to lower-income census tracts and many were on the South and West sides. The researchers nevertheless identified seasonality as a barrier because many participating farmers' markets and farm stands operated only during the summer, and they cautioned that proximity alone did not measure whether residents could or did use the program.

The overall distribution of farmers' markets has also been a subject of public policy. Chicago's 2024 city schedule listed 30 markets, of which six were on the South and West sides. In February 2025, city officials said they were considering a broader system of public markets and support for existing neighborhood markets as part of a food-access strategy; the proposal was still in the planning stage.

== See also ==
- Green City Market
- Maxwell Street
- Cuisine of Chicago
