= Herman Badillo =

Puerto Rican politician (1929–2014)

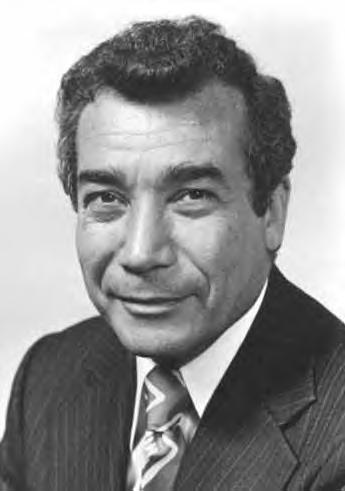

Member of the U.S. House of Representatives from New York
- In office January 3, 1971 – December 31, 1977
- Preceded by: Jacob H. Gilbert
- Succeeded by: Robert Garcia
- Constituency: 22nd district (1971–1973); 21st district (1973–1977)

8th Borough President of The Bronx
- In office December 28, 1965 – December 31, 1969
- Preceded by: Joseph F. Periconi
- Succeeded by: Robert Abrams

Personal details
- Born: August 21, 1929 Caguas, Puerto Rico
- Died: December 3, 2014 (aged 85) Manhattan, New York, U.S.
- Party: Democratic (until late 1990s) Republican (From Late 1990s)
- Spouses: Norma Lit (m. 1949; div. 1960); Irma Deutsch (m. 1961; died 1996); Gail Roberts (m. 1996)
- Children: 1
- Education: City College of New York (BBA); Brooklyn Law School (LLB)
- Occupation: Lawyer

Herman Badillo (/bɑːˈdiːjoʊ/ bah-DEE-yoh, Spanish: [baˈðiʝo]; August 21, 1929 – December 3, 2014) was an American lawyer and politician who served as borough president of The Bronx and United States Representative, and ran for Mayor of New York City. He was the first Puerto Rican elected to these posts, and the first Puerto Rican mayoral candidate in a major city in the continental United States.

== Early years and personal life ==
Badillo was born in Caguas, Puerto Rico. When he was 11 years old, both of his parents died of tuberculosis and he was sent to live with his aunt in New York City. After graduating from the public school system at Haaren High School, Badillo attended the City College of New York earning a Bachelor in Business Administration in 1951. In 1954 he received an LL.B. from Brooklyn Law School, graduating first in his class. The next year he was admitted to the New York State Bar. In 1956, he also became a certified public accountant.

== Early political career ==
After joining the Caribe Democratic Club in 1958, Badillo held several city and state positions. He was elected Bronx Borough President in 1965 and took office in January 1966. Before that, he had served as New York Commissioner of Housing Preservation and Development.

When Badillo became Bronx Borough President, the future of Bronx Borough Hall was already under dispute. His predecessor, Joseph F. Periconi, had supported efforts by historians and preservation advocates to have the building designated as a landmark. In October 1965, the Landmarks Preservation Commission granted the designation, which then went to the Board of Estimate of New York City for final review.

On January 27, 1966, the final day of the 90-day review period, the Board of Estimate voted to revoke the building's landmark status, taking into account the position of the new borough president. In 1968, a fire of undetermined origin damaged part of the interior. Although the building remained repairable, it was demolished in 1969.

== U.S. House of Representatives ==
In 1970 Badillo was elected to the United States House of Representatives from New York's 21st District in the South Bronx, becoming the first Puerto Rican to so serve. He was re-elected for three subsequent consecutive terms. He was also a member of the Committee on Education and Labor.

In 1976 he was challenged by South Bronx Councilman Ramon Velez in a contest for the Democratic Party nomination for Congressman of the 21st District. Badillo was reelected easily with 75 percent of the vote. In December of that year, he was one of the five Latino members of Congress who established the Congressional Hispanic Caucus. Largely by his efforts, job training for unemployed non-English speaking citizens was included in the "Comprehensive Manpower Act of 1973".

Badillo also served on the Banking, Finance and Urban Affairs Committee and the Small Business Committee, where he had a seat on the Minority Enterprise and General Oversight Sub-committee. During his time in office he supported legislation intended to counteract various types of discrimination in employment, including discrimination base on age and marital status.

Although he would later become a vociferous opponent of bilingual education, as a congressman Badillo was one of the first champions of funding for bilingual education programs. Some proponents of bilingual and ESL education, and opponents of English immersion, attacked Badillo for his newfound opposition to Spanish-language teaching. He was also a critical player in the reauthorization of the Voting Rights Act and the inclusion of its language access provisions. During his tenure in Congress, he became an important national spokesperson for Federal investment in urban centers.

== Mayoral campaigns ==
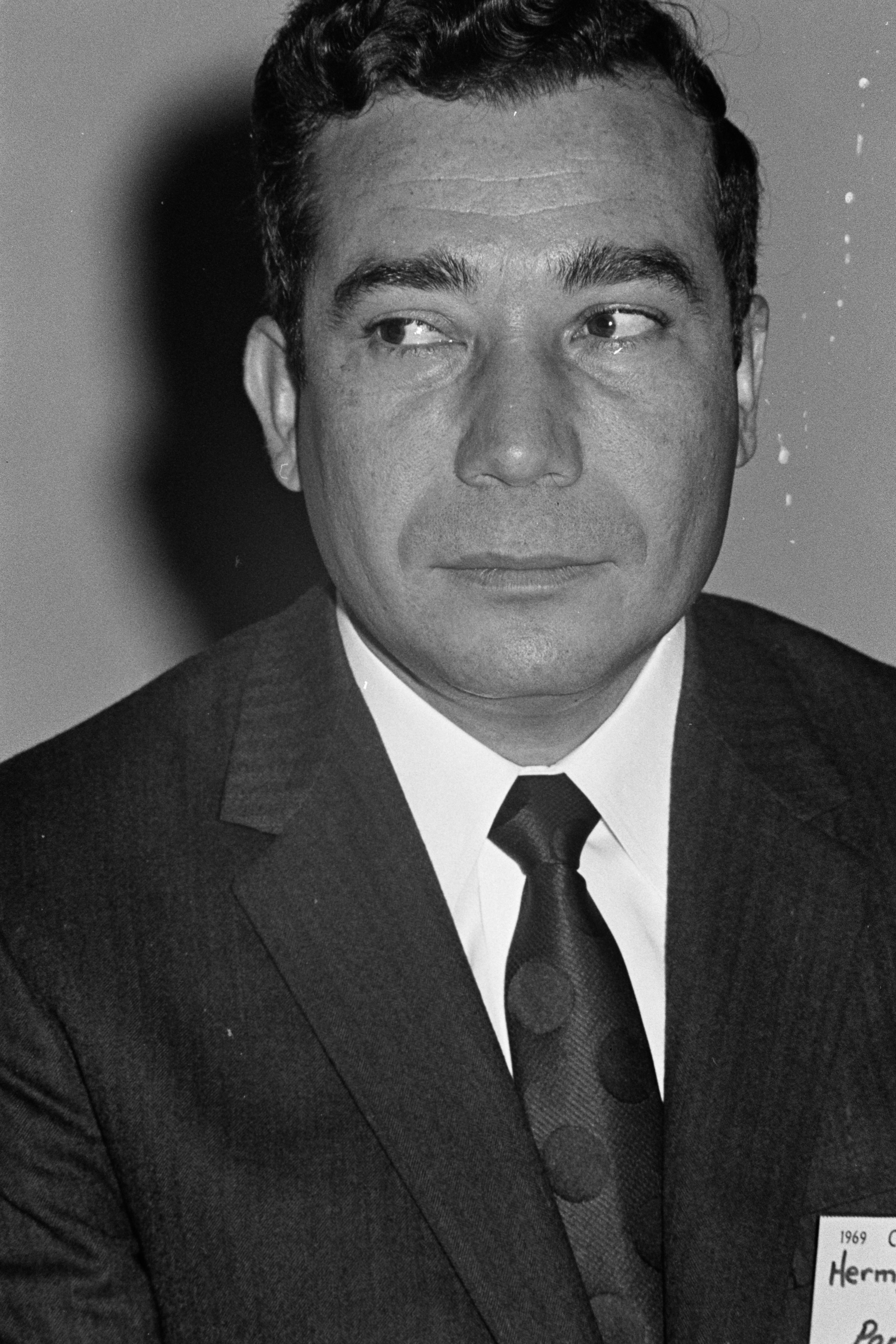
Badillo in 1969

Badillo sought the Democratic nomination for mayor of New York in 1969, 1973, 1977, 1981 and 1985. In the 1973 Democratic primary he came in second with 29% of the vote behind Abe Beame (34%) and ahead of Mario Biaggi (21%) and Albert H. Blumenthal (16%). His closest contest came in his second attempt when he was defeated by then-New York City Comptroller Abe Beame in a runoff primary, in 1973. This was the first election with a primary run off.

In 1981 and 1985 he did not appear on the ballot, dropping out after early moves to stage a campaign failed to generate broad enough support. Badillo unsuccessfully sought a Republican mayoral nomination in 2001, losing in a landslide vote for billionaire businessman and political neophyte Michael Bloomberg who would later prevail in that general election.

== Deputy Mayor of New York City ==
Badillo resigned from Congress on December 31, 1977, to become deputy mayor of New York City under Mayor Ed Koch, a position he held until September 1979. Badillo was one of seven deputy mayors appointed by Koch for the first portion of his administration. He served alongside Basil Paterson. As a deputy mayor Badillo handled labor relations and community outreach for Koch. In a major public disagreement with Mayor Koch over the lack of support for his program to revitalize the South Bronx, Badillo resigned his post. Some argue that Badillo made a major career mistake in giving up his Congressional post for this appointed position under Mayor Koch.

== Post-City Hall career and State Comptroller campaign ==
After leaving City Hall, Badillo worked as an attorney in New York City. He supported Mario Cuomo for governor over Koch during the 1982 Democratic primary. In late 1983 Cuomo appointed Badillo Chairman of the State of New York Mortgage Agency. In 1985 Badillo considered a bid for mayor against Koch in the Democratic primary. The 1985 mayoral election had consequential politics for New York City. In 1986 Badillo was the Democratic nominee for New York State Comptroller, losing to Republican incumbent Edward Regan. During these years Badillo was also active in Presidential politics, supporting Alan Cranston for the Democratic presidential nomination in 1984 and Michael Dukakis in 1988.

== City Comptroller campaign ==
In 1993, Badillo, though still a Democrat, campaigned for Comptroller of New York City on a "fusion" basis with Republican Rudy Giuliani's mayoral campaign. He also sought the Democratic nomination, but finished third, behind Alan Hevesi and the incumbent Comptroller, Elizabeth Holtzman. Although Giuliani won the general election, Badillo, running on the Republican and Liberal party lines, was defeated by Hevesi.

In 1993 Eric Adams, while President of the Grand Council of Guardians, accused Badillo of betraying his Hispanic heritage by having as his wife a white, Jewish woman (Irma, to whom Badillo had been married for 32 years, and who had Alzheimer's), instead of a Latina. Badillo responded that "Voting based on race is the definition of racism, and has no place in a civilized multiracial society..." Badillo added: "I don't apologize to anyone for the fact that my wife is Jewish."

== Giuliani administration and CUNY chairmanship ==
Badillo held a series of positions with the Giuliani administration, serving as the mayor's Special Counsel on education policy and as chairman of the board of trustees of the City University of New York. In his capacity as Giuliani's education advisor, Badillo advocated increased mayoral control of the public schools and a revamped curriculum; he was also Giuliani's liaison to the city's board of education.

These actions gained him some support among conservatives but alienated him from the mainstream of the Puerto Rican political leadership, which had been his traditional base.

In 1999, Badillo's remarks about Latino immigrants ignited calls for his dismissal. His reference to recent Dominican Republic and Mexico immigrants as "pure Indians -- Incas and Mayans who are about, you know, five feet tall with straight hair," and never having a "tradition of education" were widely criticized, and he apologized two days later.

== Republican Party switch and 2001 mayoral campaign ==
In the late 1990s Badillo formally joined the Republican Party. He resigned as education special counsel and CUNY Chairman when announcing his candidacy for mayor in 2001. Despite his strong support of Mayor Giuliani, Badillo's bid for mayor never received serious support from Giuliani or the Republican Party, and he lost badly in the Republican primary to billionaire Michael Bloomberg, who had just switched parties as Badillo had done earlier.

== Later career ==
In 2005, Badillo became "of counsel" to the New York City law firm of Sullivan Papain Block McGrath & Cannavo P.C. In 2006 he joined the conservative Manhattan Institute for Policy Research as a senior fellow. In January 2011 Badillo joined national personal injury law firm Parker Waichman Alonso as a senior counsel in its New York office.

=== Death ===
Badillo died on December 3, 2014, at the Weill Cornell Medical Center in Manhattan, of congestive heart failure at the age of 85.

== NYS and NYC tickets Herman Badillo ran on ==
=== 1986 NYS Democratic ticket ===
- Governor: Mario Cuomo
- Lieutenant Governor: Stan Lundine
- Comptroller: Herman Badillo
- Attorney General: Robert Abrams
- U.S. Senate: Mark Green

=== 1993 NYC Republican and Liberal ticket ===
- Mayor: Rudy Giuliani
- Public Advocate: Susan Alter
- Comptroller: Herman Badillo

== Publications ==
- A Bill of No Rights: Attica and the American Prison System (New York: Outerbridge and Lazard, Inc., 1972). With Milton Haynes.
- Plain Talk: The Politics of Administration (Greenvale, N.Y.: Department of Health and Public Administration, C.W. Post Center, Long Island University, 1981).
- One Nation, One Standard: An Ex-Liberal on How Hispanics Can Succeed Just Like Other Immigrant Groups (New York: Sentinel, 2006.) (Penguin (December 28, 2006), hardcover, 256 pages, ISBN 1-59523-019-X, ISBN 978-1-59523-019-5)
  This book generated major controversy within the Latino community before it was even published because of an inflammatory article in the New York Post (December 19, 2006, p. 8) announcing its release. In the book Badillo criticizes what he perceives as a lax work ethic among Hispanics, who he contends do not value education as much as other immigrants just as historically impoverished but more successful, such as Asian-Americans.
  In contrast to the support he gave to bilingual education during his early career, his book attacks what he describes as obstacles to assimilation, such as bilingual education, and urges Hispanics to eschew government solutions and adopt instead the cultural values that have made previous generations of American immigrants prosperous and successful. His view is that Hispanics will soon make up 25% of the population of the United States and that their failure to excel would be tragic for them and the nation.

== Death and legacy ==
"His death, at the Weill Cornell Medical Center, was caused by complications of congestive heart failure, his son, David, said."

There is a school in Buffalo, New York called Herman Badillo Bilingual Academy.

== See also ==
- List of Puerto Ricans
- List of Hispanic and Latino Americans in the United States Congress
- Nuyorican
- Puerto Ricans in New York City

Political offices
Preceded by Joseph F. Periconi	Borough President of the Bronx; 1966–1970	Succeeded by Robert Abrams
U.S. House of Representatives
Preceded by Jacob H. Gilbert	Member of the U.S. House of Representatives from New York's 22nd congressional district 1971–1973	Succeeded by Jonathan B. Bingham
Preceded by James H. Scheuer	Member of the U.S. House of Representatives from New York's 21st congressional district 1973–1977	Succeeded by Robert Garcia
Party political offices
Preceded by Raymond F. Gallagher	Democratic Nominee for New York State Comptroller; 1986	Succeeded by Carol Bellamy
Preceded by Albert Lemishow	Republican Nominee for New York City Comptroller; 1993	Succeeded by Annemarie McAvoy
