= List of New York City borough halls and municipal buildings =

This is a list of New York City borough halls and municipal buildings used for civic agencies. Each of the borough halls serve as offices for their respective borough presidents and borough boards.

- New York City Hall
- Manhattan Municipal Building, Civic Center
- Bronx County Courthouse, Concourse, Bronx
- Brooklyn Borough Hall, Downtown Brooklyn
- Queens Borough Hall, Kew Gardens
- Staten Island Borough Hall, St. George

== Former ==
- Bronx Borough Courthouse
- Bronx Borough Hall

== See also ==
- Borough president
- Government of New York City
- Gracie Mansion
- Mayor of New York City
