= Michael Garvin =

Michael Garvin may refer to:

- Michael J. Garvin (1861–1918), American architect
- Michael Ray Garvin (born 1986), American football wide receiver
