= Bronx court system delays =

Controversy in New York City

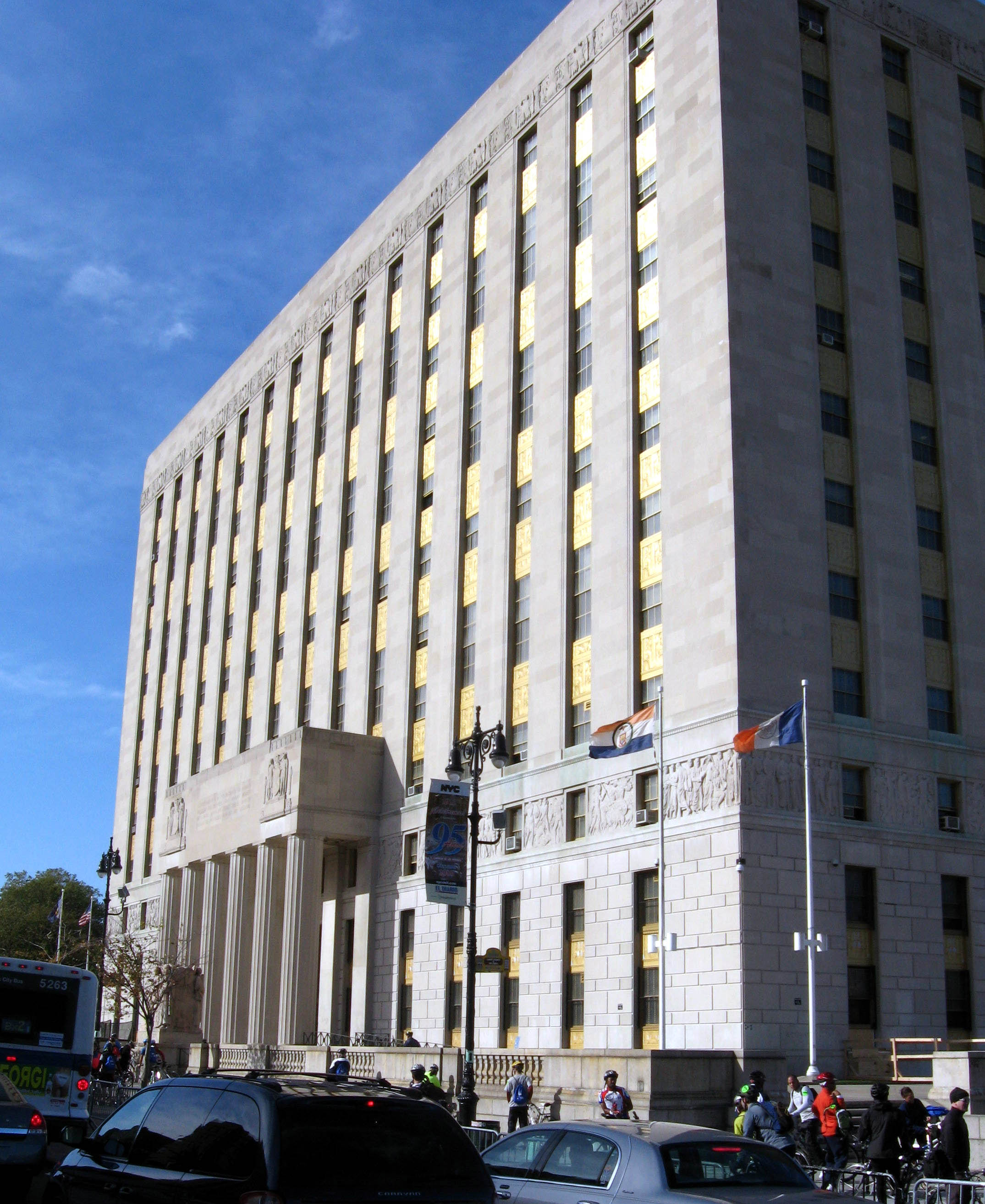
Bronx County Courthouse

Extensive media attention and public criticism has been directed at the Bronx's court system, due to delays in bringing cases to trial, which are seen by critics as a clear infringement of defendants' constitutional right to a speedy trial.

According to The New York Times, the Bronx court system had 3,880 felony cases awaiting trial as of November 2013, of which 397 were older than two years. This accounted for over 47% of the total open felony cases older than two years in the New York City court system. Accused persons who are denied bail must remain in jail while awaiting trial, with some spending five years or more in pre-trial detention. Several explanations have been offered for the backlog of cases. One factor may be the economic condition of the Bronx, which is the poorest of New York City's boroughs, thereby lacking "political clout to stir outrage and force reform". Some critics contend that high numbers of arrests in the borough, particularly for misdemeanor offenses, are the underlying source of the problem. Others believe that criminal attorneys deliberately delay trial proceedings, for example by routinely showing up late, or by employing time-wasting cross-examinations.

In January 2013, judges from neighboring court districts were enlisted to help work through the case backlog, in a strategy termed "blockbuster". New York State chief judge Jonathan Lippman was quoted as saying the extra personnel working Bronx cases would eliminate the backlog within six months. Although the number of cases settled or brought to trial did increase during this time, The New York Times reported that as of July 2013, the number of outstanding cases remained "the largest in New York City — more than Brooklyn, Manhattan, Queens and Staten Island combined."

== Examples ==
In one case that received media attention, Michael Ikoli was charged with murder, accused of shooting two people at a roller-skating rink with a friend in 2004. He waited in Rikers Island for five years without a trial because of the backlog in the Bronx courts; it wasn't until October 2009 when the New York Daily News exposed the case as part of a story on the severe backlog of felony cases in the Bronx courts when his case was fast-tracked for trial, and in December 2009 he was acquitted of all charges when his trial ended. In May 2011, Ikoli was shot to death in the Bronx in a gang-related shooting.
