= Michael J. Garvin =

American architect

Michael John Garvin
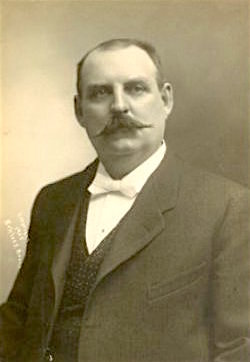
- Michael J. Garvin in 1905
- Born: January 31, 1861; Bronx, New York, United States
- Died: September 3, 1918 (aged 57); Bronx, New York, United States
- Occupation: Architect

Michael John Garvin, also known as Michael J. Garvin and M. J. Garvin (1861–1918), was an American architect from The Bronx, New York. A graduate of Manhattan College, he served as the first Building Commissioner of the borough (1897–1903) and its first Under Sheriff. With the placement of the influential IRT Third Avenue Elevated train, Garvin was immersed in designing many surrounding structures during the borough's increasing growth at the turn of the 20th century. Of his architectural contributions the Haffen Building; the Fire House, Hook and Ladder 17; and the Bronx Borough Courthouse have all become New York City landmarks while the latter a US National Historic Place.

== Early life and career ==
Michael J. Garvin was born on January 31, 1861, at Grove Hill, Morrisania (Bronx), (Note: Before the western section of the present-day Bronx became a borough of New York City, it was part of colonial Westchester County and it formed part of three different towns:(listing North to South) Yonkers, West Farms, and Morrisania. Much of what is known today as the south west section of The Bronx (bound by the Cross Bronx Expressway, Harlem River, Bronx River, Bronx Kill & East River) is part of colonial Morrisania and West Farms. The majority of development north of Manhattan's 125th Street within the mainland occurred in Morrisania as it was the first to annex. The street grid was being designed to follow that of Manhattan, and the New York and Harlem Railroad (currently the Metro-North Harlem Line) traveled through there. Separate neighborhoods were formed, such as High Bridgeville (now High Bridge Heights); West Morrisania (now Concourse & Fleetwood); Mott Haven, North New York (Old Morrisania)^{2}, & Wilton (all three now inaccurately grouped and acknowledged as Mott Haven); Port Morris (still regarded as such); South Melrose, & Melrose (now only Melrose); East Morrisania, Grove Hill, Forest Grove, & Woodstock (now grouped and referred to as Woodstock); Eltona and Morrisania (or North Morrisania. Now referred to as Morrisania). Grove Hill was a small neighborhood generally bound by what is today St. Anns Ave, 163rd Street, 156th Street and Trinity Avenue. The neighborhood was filled with many two-three story brick and brownstone homes. After West Farms was annexed, its lower quarter was adjoined to Morrisania and designated as the Twenty-third ward, while West Farms became the Twenty-fourth ward.) New York. Son of Patrick and Ann Garvin, natives of Ireland, he was a lifelong resident of the city. He attended the borough public schools and went on to graduate from Manhattan College, which was then located in Manhattanville. After leaving school, in 1884 he studied under architect August Schmidt. He, then for a long time, was an apprentice with Joseph M. Dunn, who had been with Renwick & Sands, architects of St. Patrick's Cathedral. Progressively, he ventured on his own to design and establish a successful architectural and civil engineering office at 3307 Third Avenue. During this period, by September 1894, he married Miss Catherine Cronk and had two sons.

As the IRT Third Avenue Elevated Train was being constructed in The Bronx in 1897, and New York City consolidated in 1898, there was an enormous growth of population and financial investment. New homes were built in high demand. Garvin, as well as several contemporary architects, designed single-family town houses, multistory apartment homes, and various business or manufacturing establishments. The borough was a prosperous place and Garvin became a well respected architect among the borough's civic leaders, joining the Property Owners' Association of the Twenty-third Ward (Morrisania).

== Politics ==
With government positions created as per the city's new expansion in 1898, Garvin was looked to for his knowledge in city planning. He became secretary to the first President of the Borough, Louis F. Haffen, and was appointed first Commissioner of Buildings for Bronx. He was a democrat, an executive member of the Samoset Democratic Club. And like most civic roles in the city at the time, he worked through the confines of Tammany Hall.

Through his tenure, Garvin was the architect of public works. His reputation increased with his dedication. He had a growing relationship with the prominent Haffen family, who were influential in the extension of the IRT Third Avenue Elevated train in the borough, the full Bronx annexation, and the borough eventually becoming a separate county. Founders of the Haffen Brewing Company and the Dollar Savings Bank of the City of New York, The Haffen family was one of the main families of the Bronx, having made essential contributions to the physical and social infrastructure of the borough including surveying and laying out of parks and the streets, developing real estate, and organizing of a number of civic, social, and financial institutions.

== Haffen Building ==
Matthias Haffen, brother of Louis F. Haffen, was an active real estate developer. He wanted to erect a first-class office building for banking and professional tenants. He turned to Garvin for his experience with the area. The two, with Garvin's design, created the Haffen Building (1901–02), a seven-story Beaux-Arts style office complex. It served as the home of several banks and law offices. The building is presently regarded as a "distinct structure" which "is an outstanding and remarkably intact example of Beaux-Arts aesthetic."

== Bronx Borough Courthouse and controversy ==
By 1900, Bronx had seen an exponential increase in population from 40,000 in 1874 to 200,000. There was a necessity for a proper courthouse to be placed in the borough. For several years, Bronx advocates including Louis F. Haffen, and The Association of the Bar, in the Borough of the Bronx, in the City of New York, petitioned for the placement of the courthouse. By the turn of the century, they were successful as the city allocated funding for a new building that would represent the area and growing population that had increased from 40,000 in 1874 to more than 200,000 by 1900.

Borough President Louis F. Haffen appointed Garvin with the task of designing the Bronx Borough Courthouse, worth $40,000, on April 1, 1903. Garvin resigned his position as Superintendent of Buildings a day earlier in an effort to focus primarily on what would be a significant building for the borough. After submitting a proposal, his early concepts were not favored by the New York Art Commission. The drafts were regarded as less than expected for the site. Still with the job to complete, Garvin searched for different consulting architects in the city to assist with planning. He reached out to a former colleague of his, architect Oscar Florianus Bluemner, a German émigré (of Prussia) who had been a prize student at Berlin’s Royal Academy of Design, who also studied in Paris. Ten years earlier he worked for Garvin at his company. It presented a stroke of luck for both men to once again collaborate. Though the story not absolute, it is speculated that Garvin offered to share fees and credit for their combined efforts in return for an acceptable building. Garvin eventually submitted a design that was well received by the Art Commission.

Frustrated by the news, when construction began in 1905, Bluemner denounced Garvin and claimed that the two had entered into an agreement that Garvin did not want to uphold. Bluemner sued for $20,000 and argued that he was the true author of the design and not Garvin, who according to him was incapable of drawing "the plans for a big thing like the new Court House to save his life. He is a fairly good architect of tenements and apartment house, but that is all." Garvin in his defense said that,"In the first place, only the model has been adopted by the Municipal Art Commission, subject to the presentation later on of the working plans. In the second place I never entered into any agreement of any kind with Bluemner. The only connection I ever had with the man was when I employed him as a draughtsman at a fixed salary. He was only with me for ten weeks, and I paid him every cent there was coming to him. While he was working for me he went around making a lot of remarks. I would give anything in my power to have the case through with. It is absurd for Bluemner to claim that he drew the plans for the Court House. He didn't have anything to do with them."

Bluemner stated that Garvin approached him because he was in need of completing the design for the courthouse and he would give him equal credit and pay for their collaboration. He said that he didn't make Garvin sign a contract because they had done previous work together and Bluemner considered Garvin a friend. Bluemner demonstrated certain knowledge of Beaux-Arts and Art Nouveau found in the courthouse. His compelling case led to the court (controversially) ruling in his favor. The case was appealed by Garvin and did not settle until 1911.

Bluemner's testimony lead to an array of investigations. John Purroy Mitchel, a young crusading lawyer who was attempting to advance his career by investigating municipal corruption, preyed on Bluemner's involvement with Garvin. Mitchel, who was aiming to become mayor of New York City, campaigned to eliminate all five offices of the borough presidents. He determinedly managed to remove the Manhattan Borough President. He then set his sights on Haffen, precisely because he had designated the courthouse plan to Garvin.

Since Borough President Haffen, considered to be a prominent and noble representative in office, respected by many in the city, was the delegate in charge who entrusted Garvin with the plan, he resigned in order to extinguish any attempts to taint the view of the resourcefulness and flourishing development in the prosperous borough. Bluemner, continued to help Mitchel, who possibly promised him a civil career in architecture under his administration, to oust the then Queens Borough President. After the case ended, the court awarded Bluemner $5,000, one-quarter of the amount he claimed to be owed. It was concluded that Garvin had majority credit for the building. Mitchel moved up the political latter. After he became mayor, Bluemner never received a commission for a public building. In disappointment by politics and surrounded by controversy, Bluemner left the profession and turned to a promising career in painting. Garvin remained as supervising architect through the beginning and completion of the project from 1905 to 1914.

When construction began, it was estimated that the building would cost $800,000 and be completed between two and three years. However, due to the controversy in court and political maneuvers from interested parties to decrease funding for the courthouse, construction extended for nearly ten years. The population in the borough had increased to over 500,000 and the total construction cost of the building amounted to $2,000,000. Bronx Borough Courthouse soon opened its doors to the judicial system and was the center of ordinance for the next twenty years.

The public scandal called into question Garvin’s abilities as an architect, and whether it was his association with the Haffen family that had fueled his success. During the controversy over the courthouse, his friend and boss Louis F. Haffen faced an inquiry scrutinized by Mitchel. Garvin was called as a witness to testify. He was asked several questions regarding architecture. Tired of all the years spent in court, and known to be full of humor, in 1909 he sarcastically replied to each, knowing that Mitchel was using them to move up in office. When asked of the function of a cornice, he said "Its function is the same as the hat upon your head." Mitchel questioned, "And that is what?" Garvin replied, "To decorate what's underneath it." Mitchel then asked of the architecture that certain known buildings in the city followed. Mitchel asked of the Singer Building. Garvin jovially responded "I don't know; I think it follows the Tower of Babel", to which the courtroom laughed.

== Latter years ==
Despite attempts from Mitchel, Garvin maintained a successful practice and career. In 1905, for the local Democratic organization, Garvin designed the Jefferson Tammany Hall, at the southwest corner of 159th Street and Elton Avenue. He built a public bath at the south east corner of 156th Street and Elton Avenue. In 1906 he designed the Fire House, Hook and Ladder 17 (1906–1907) at 341 East 143rd Street, a combined Beaux-Arts and Neoclassical architecture that has become a New York City Landmark. He designed the Bronx Theater at Franklin Avenue and 165th Street. And he continued to construct several apartment buildings in the borough that still survive today. He became leader of the democratic party of his district. He was also a member of the Jefferson, Schnorf' and Tallapoosa Clubs, the Elsmere Bowling Club, the Bunker Hill-Association, the "Gentlemen's Sons," the Brownson Catholic Club, and the Knights of Columbus.

When Garvin died on September 3, 1918, he was honored by many Bronx civic leaders, including then Borough President Henry Bruckner.

He lived at 837 Caudwell Avenue, Grove Hill.

Throughout his career he had many aspiring architects working with him. Max Hausle (1870–1943), one of Garvin's associates, along with Joseph H. Freedlander would go on to build the Bronx County Courthouse

== List of buildings and legacy ==
Garvin created numerous buildings, mostly in groups, in the neighborhoods of North New York (associated today as Mott Haven), (Note: North New York (Old Morrisania) was a residential neighborhood in the town of Morrisania. It was generally bounded by what is today 149th St, Morris Avenue, St. Anns Avenue and the Bronx Kill. It encompassed the original residence of Jonas Bronck (near 132nd Street and Lincoln Avenue), the home of Lewis Morris (by 133rd Street between Willis Avenue and Brown Place (originally Morris Avenue), by Pulaski Park), and was in proximity to the home estate of Gouverneur Morris (by what would have been between 130th Street, 131st Street, St. Anns Avenue and present day Cypress Avenue (originally Home Avenue and later Trinity Avenue)). It was defined as North New York because it was the most clustered residential neighborhood on the mainland just north of Manhattan's 125th Street. It was near the New York and Harlem Railroad, and the Harlem Bridge Fordham and Morrisania Horse Railroad (later replaced on the same path by the IRT Third Avenue Elevated train). It was also given the name because the street grid was mostly aligned with that of Manhattan, and it was found just north of the island. It was an upper-middle class residence. Meanwhile, the true Mott Haven was an industrial neighborhood mostly bound by today's 149th St, Harlem River, Morris Avenue, and Bronx Kill. It also completely deviates from the grid alignment with Manhattan. It is the area where Mott Avenue (present-day southern end of Grand Boulevard and Concourse) was built. This was the land originally bought by Jordan L. Mott from the Morris family for his business venture and where his known canal was made. Currently Canal Place is still present which marks the true history of the area. Over time, North New York was erroneously omitted from maps which limited the amount of neighborhoods illustrated. They mostly focused on key areas or names of stations along the railroads. North New York was then associated with the nearest neighborhood which was Mott Haven. There is a clear difference in terms of their historical presence in the area as residential and industrial, and by the layout of the streets. Still today those qualities are largely visible.) Melrose, and Morrisania (or North Morrisania) in Bronx. Some of his buildings, including his office, the theater, the public bath, and Jefferson Hall have disappeared due to the arson of the 1970s that destroyed many period homes and buildings of the late 19th to early 20th century in the borough. But of the few that have survived (this by no means is a complete list), there is visibility of Beaux-Arts and Neoclassical styles. Some of Garvin's work that still remain, which only needs refreshing, in addition to the three landmarks include:

- 234 Brook Avenue; 514,518, 522, 526, 530, & 534 East 138th Street (between Brook Avenue and St. Anns Avenue – seven buildings)
- 597, 601, & 605 East 138th Street (between St. Anns Avenue and Cypress Avenue - three buildings)
- 208 Willis Avenue & 401 136th Street (these two buildings are found near the Bertine Block Historic District)
- 602 East 139th Street (between St. Anns Avenue and Cypress Avenue) (last remaining building of a six-building construction)
- 570 St. Marys Street by St. Anns Avenue) & 576 St. Marys Street (between St. Anns Avenue and Crimmins Avenue)
- 328-340, 348, & 352 Beekman Avenue by 141st Street (between 141st Street and St. Marys Street (143rd Street) – eight buildings)
- 272 East 163rd Street at Morris Avenue
- 340 194th Street
- 351 W. 152nd Street by Cortland Avenue
- 429 East 157th Street by Elton Avenue
- 860 Hunts Point Avenue by Seneca Avenue

In studying the 1902 Beaux-Arts Haffen Building and looking clearly at the entrance-way on Third Avenue, the archway and linear features can be seen at the base of the Bronx Borough Courthouse. The 1906 Firehouse also carries certain details that are present at the top. Meanwhile, the second level of the courthouse and choice of stone work and overall layout for the entire building is put into serious argument by academic observers. The style is Beaux-Arts mixed with Art Nouveau that was present in Europe at the time. Garvin had never traveled to Europe or studied there as Bluemner did, nor did he ever design a public building of that nature. Perhaps this is where Bluemner fully contributed, as some concepts can be seen in his later artwork. Bluemner more than likely put the courthouse to the level of style that the Art Commission was favoring. It is very possible that the two did agree to collaborate, as judged twice in a courtroom, and Bluemner was in fact the person who made the design into what we see today. Garvin, however, finished the construction and final details. Currently, he is seen as the sole designer of the courthouse. While debates have persisted as to who in fact designed the building, maybe it is time to equally recognize both under landmark status, along with Jules Edouard Roiné for his statue of Lady Justice, for contributing and making a fine example of combined Beaux-Arts Classicism and Art Nouveau architecture.

== See also ==
- Haffen Building
- Bronx Borough Courthouse
- National Register of Historic Places listings in Bronx County, New York
- List of New York City Designated Landmarks in The Bronx
