= Haffen Brewing Company =

- Trade name: J&M Haffen Brewing Company
- Company type: Private
- Industry: Alcohol industry, Brewery
- Founded: 1856; 169 years ago in The Bronx, United States
- Founder: Matthias Haffen
- Defunct: 1917; 108 years ago
- Fate: Brewery property converted to commercial real estate.
- Headquarters: Haffen Building, The Hub Melrose, The Bronx, United States
- Key people: John Haffen, Louis F. Haffen, Jacob Ruppert, Sr.
- Owner: Jacob Ruppert, Jr.

Haffen Brewery, later J&M Haffen Brewing Company, and incorporated as Haffen Brewing Company in 1900, operated in Bronx, New York from 1856 until 1917. Owned by Matthias Haffen, (1814–1891), who came to the United States from Bavaria in 1831, it was a "landmark" on old Melrose Avenue between 151st Street and 152nd Street. The Haffen Building, a seven-story Beaux-Arts architecture style office building by architect Michael J. Garvin was built for him in 1901 to 1902. He married Catherine (Hays) Haffen (1823–1888), an emigrant from Limerick, Ireland, in 1840. They had six children.

Matthias's German-Irish sons included John Haffen (1847–1910), two term Bronx Borough President Louis F. Haffen and Henry (1852–1932), who served on the New York Board of Aldermen. John Haffen took over the brewery and was involved in banking, including as a founding of Dollar Savings Bank. He was also involved in a funding deal for Wakefield Park, in return for a beer concession, but blue laws kept the park and its planned Sunday Irish athletic events from happening.

The third generation of Haffens in the Bronx included John Matthias Haffen (born in 1872), a bank executive and president of the Bronx Board of Trade.

The brewery business was sold to Jacob Ruppert, Sr. (1842–1915) in 1914 for $700,000. Ruppert died soon after and left the business to Jacob Ruppert, Jr. The plan was to close the brewery down and develop the property; it was in a rapidly growing area known as the Hub.

The Haffens are interred in the Bronx on ‘Brewer’s Row’ at Woodlawn Cemetery along with a dozen other brewing scions and their families.
