= Bronx Borough Hall =

Former building in the Bronx, New York

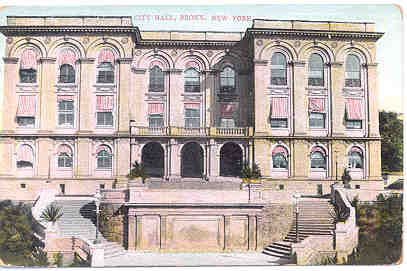
- Interactive map of the Bronx Borough Hall area
- Former names: The Bronx Municipal Building; Old Bronx Borough Hall

General information
- Type: Municipal Building
- Architectural style: Renaissance
- Location: Tremont Park in East Tremont, Bronx, New York
- Coordinates: 40.845975°N 73.895506°W
- Completed: 1897
- Demolished: 1969

Design and construction
- Architect: George B. Post
- Designations: New York City Landmark (1965–1966)

Borough Hall in northwest part of park

The Bronx Municipal Building, later known as Bronx Borough Hall and eventually as Old Bronx Borough Hall (1897–1969), was the original administrative headquarters of the Bronx Borough President and other local civic leaders. It was located in the East Tremont neighborhood of the Bronx, New York City.

Considered an architectural accomplishment of its era, it was located atop the rocky plateau of the northwest section of present-day Tremont Park, which was originally an extension of Crotona Park, southeast of the intersection of East Tremont Avenue and Third Avenue. The elevation of the building allowed for exceptional views from distances at many angles, and it was the converging point for civic affairs. The New York City Subway's IRT Third Avenue Line, the first elevated railway line in the borough, strategically ran along the bustling neighborhoods and stopped in front of the building at the Tremont Avenue–177th Street station, where a hub of trolley lines met.

== Construction ==
Designed by George B. Post (1837–1913), a prominent New York City architect of the period, the three-story building facing west was picturesque, stylized in a Renaissance decor, with pale yellow brick and brown terra-cotta trim contrast. Post's most famous accomplishments include the New York Stock Exchange Building at 18 Broad Street and the long-gone Western Union Telegraph Building, which stood at Broadway and Dey Street in Manhattan. Russell Sturgis, writing in Architectural Record in 1896, lauded the design as a 'common sense building with pleasant architectural results.'

In 1874, the western section of present-day Bronx was annexed to New York City as the Northern annex. By then the area had approximately 40,000 people. The region was growing rapidly as by 1890 the population grew to nearly 90,000. City officials saw the demand and necessity to create a location for civic use to cater to the region. In 1891, the first district-wide official was elected, a Commissioner of Street Improvements. His agency and others developed and so required office space. By 1895 the eastern section of the present-day Bronx was annexed to the city. These expansions, along with the influx of immigrants of the period, more than doubled the population of the city to approximately 200,000. In 1895, Commissioner Louis F. Haffen, serving since 1893, led a successful campaign for a new building. The Bronx Municipal Building was completed in 1897. In 1898 the building was renamed Bronx Borough Hall when the other three boroughs were finally annexed to New York City. Louis F. Haffen became the first Bronx Borough President and was inaugurated in a second-floor office in the same year.

== Expansion and debate ==
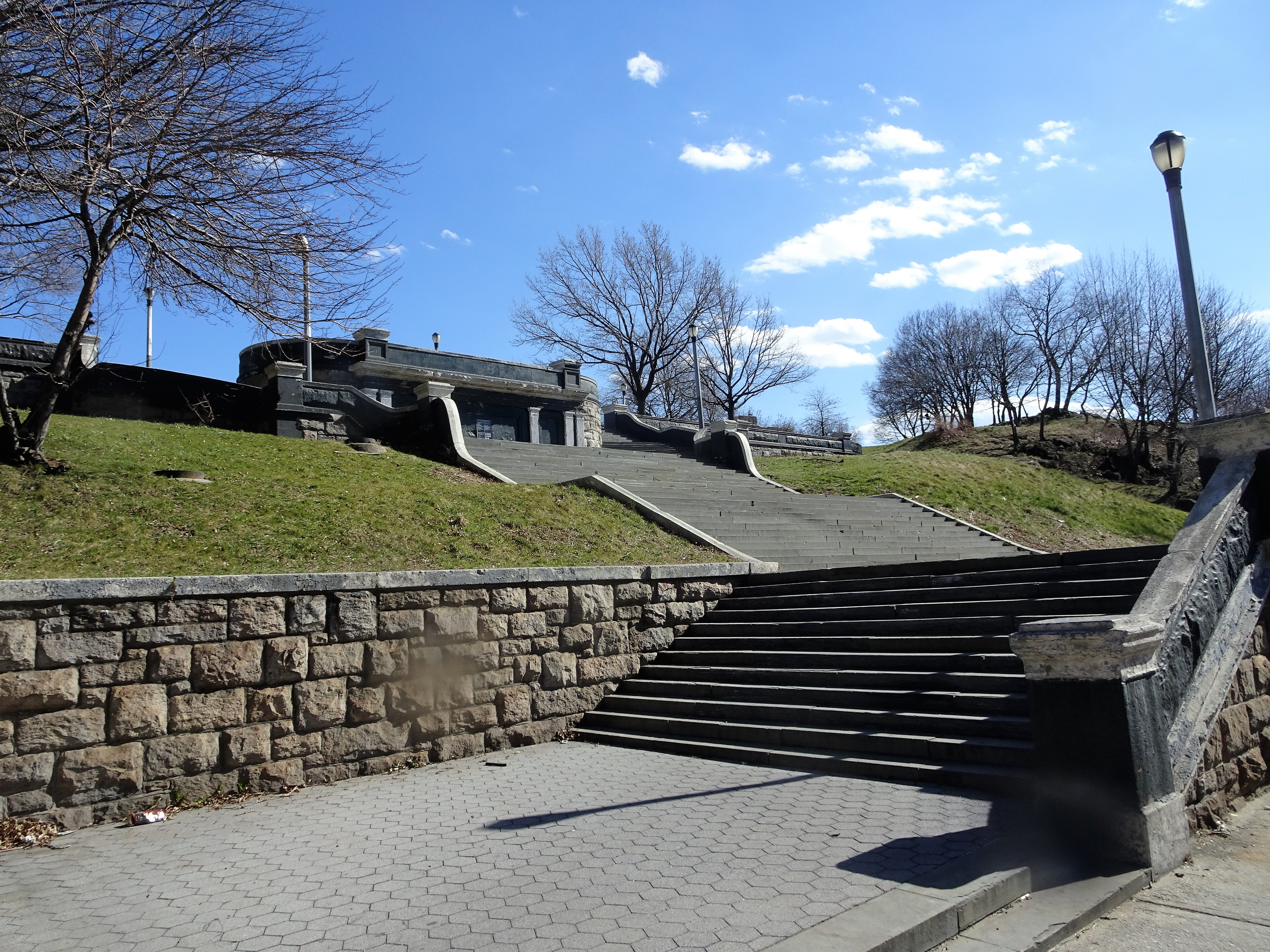
Grand Staircase, seen from Third Avenue

In 1899 a grand stairway was added down the steep slope to Third Avenue. It was perhaps designed by Post, or possibly by the chief engineer of the Bronx, Louis Risse, who had mapped the concept of the Grand Boulevard and Concourse in 1890. After World War I, Victory Park, a formal garden with paths radiating from a large circular fountain, was beautifully landscaped near Borough Hall to celebrate the Allied victory over Germany.

In contrast to the building's architectural appeal, surroundings, and the efforts taken to construct it, civic leaders began to express misgivings with regard to its capacity and usage. In 1909 Louis Haffen, president of the borough since its formation, called the building he had previously championed "entirely inadequate" and "impossible to enlarge or adapt" to the needs of the new borough. By 1928 the fifth Borough President Henry Bruckner was advocating for a New Borough Hall. The Bronx Board of Trade was proposing to construct the new Bronx Borough Hall adjacent to the current on the site of Victory Garden. They considered this to be a solution to allow for the razing of the original Borough Hall which was seen as "a non-fireproof building entirely in-adequate and out-of-keeping with the size and importance of our Borough".

== Second structure ==
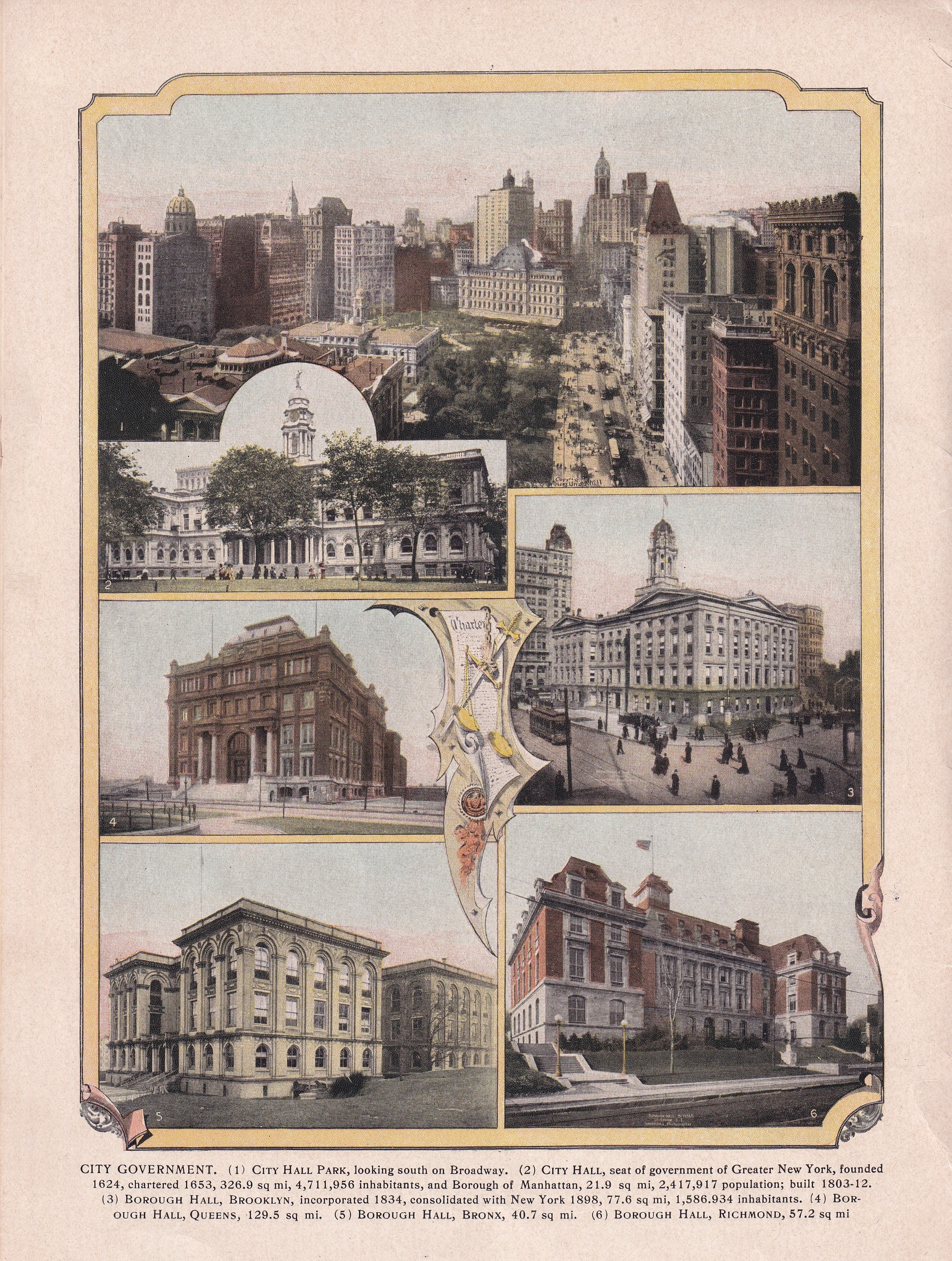
Bronx Borough Hall in 1910

By 1930, only thirty years after it joined the city, the Bronx population had grown to more than 1.25 million residents, an increase of over a million people. In response to this vast growth, amid the Great Depression, the City erected the Bronx County Courthouse (a.k.a. the Supreme Court building) between 1931 and 1934. This new building, on the Grand Concourse, replaced the smaller Bronx Borough Courthouse, constructed between 1905 and 1914. With space made available within the nine-story building, by 1934 most borough offices and government services from Borough Hall had relocated to the new edifice. By 1964 only the Marriage License Bureau remained in the former building where space was given to veterans and community programs. With the passage of years Bronx Borough Hall became referred to as Old Bronx Borough Hall, while the parkland area of Crotona Park where it stood was called Old Borough Hall Park.

During the third quarter of the 20th century, the new Cross Bronx Expressway was constructed. Built between 1948 and 1972, it was laid out in stages. One of the stages constructed in 1960 between Boston Road and Webster Avenue included the passage through Crotona Park, through the existing 175th Street separation of the northern end park extension—where Borough Hall stood—from the larger park. The expressway widened the separation of this northern section from the main part of Crotona Park. Old Borough Hall Park was then redesigned to include a baseball field at the south west end, and other sports and recreation at the east end, partly to compensate for the lost parkland.

== Landmark status and demolition ==
Reports began to surface in the city and throughout Bronx communities that a proposal was being made to demolish Old Bronx Borough Hall. The Parks Commissioner at the time, Newbold Morris, supported the idea of tearing down the building to create more park space, possibly to replenish what was lost during the construction of the Cross Bronx Expressway. In addition, the East Tremont Neighborhood Association was seeking to either convert the building for a recreation center or to replace it entirely with a new community center, to be built here rather than elsewhere in the park or nearby. Both Newbold Morris and the East Tremont Neighborhood Association claimed that the building was unsafe. Amid reports of impending demolition, members of the Bronx County Historical Society, including Bronx residents Theodore Kazimiroff, Lloyd Ultan, John McNamara, Roger Arcara and William Romkey, began efforts to save the structure, with the full support of then Bronx Borough President Joseph F. Periconi.

On September 21, 1965, the New York City Landmarks Preservation Commission held a public hearing on the proposed designation of the Old Bronx Borough Hall. Eight witnesses, including the Borough Historian and representatives of the Bronx County Historical Society, testified in favor of designation of the building. A sole representative of the Parks Department opposed the designation. The East Tremont Neighborhood Association wrote the Commission pleading that Old Borough Hall be razed and the site be used for a new indoor recreation center. Community Planning Board 6 and three other local groups supported the view of the East Tremont Neighborhood Association. In a letter to the commission, Bronx Borough President Periconi said that he would like "to reiterate my support of the designation of the Old Bronx Borough Hall as a historical landmark and urge your Commission to approve this designation." With historical facts and testimony in hand the Landmarks Preservation Commission called the borough hall "a good example of public building through the nobility and scale of the architectural elements employed."

In October 1965 the Landmarks Preservation Commission designated the building its 23rd landmark in New York City. Old Bronx Borough Hall officially became the first Bronx landmark. The landmarks law gave the New York City Board of Estimate 90 days in which to veto or modify any designation. In December, Commissioner Newbold Morris again wrote the board, calling the building rundown, unsightly and of no architectural importance. Borough President Periconi had emphatically supported the designation through his tenure. In January 1966 he was succeeded by new Borough President Herman Badillo. On January 27, 1966—the last possible day of review—the Board of Estimate deferred to Badillo and his view, and voted to overturn the designation.

In 1968 there was a major fire in the building, by then completely vacant. Continued efforts by the Bronx County Historical Society and others to renovate the hall for civic use were halted when the building was deemed structurally unsafe, and then demolished on January 12, 1969. Only the grand staircase survives, though in poor state. Despite claims through the years that the building was a fire hazard, a 1969 article by Professor Lloyd Ultan in the Bronx County Historical Society Journal reported that the interior of Old Bronx Borough Hall had both gas and electric lighting and fireproof document vaults on each floor. Despite demands from the East Tremont Neighborhood Association, Bronx Borough Hall was never replaced by a sports center nor was one built nearby.

== Current plans ==
Over the years, the park has been renamed to Highland Park (1987), Tremont Park (1999), and Walter Gladwin Park (2020). It has seen different renovations, but investments have yet to rehabilitate the stairway that now leads to an empty top and to commemorate an iconic chapter in Bronx and New York's preservation history.

The Bronx currently does not have a proper stand-alone administration building for the Bronx Borough President's office and other civic agencies. These offices continue to operate out from the Bronx County Courthouse.

== See also ==
- List of New York City borough halls and municipal buildings
- Historic preservation in New York
