= Oscar Florianus Bluemner =

American painter

Oscar Bluemner
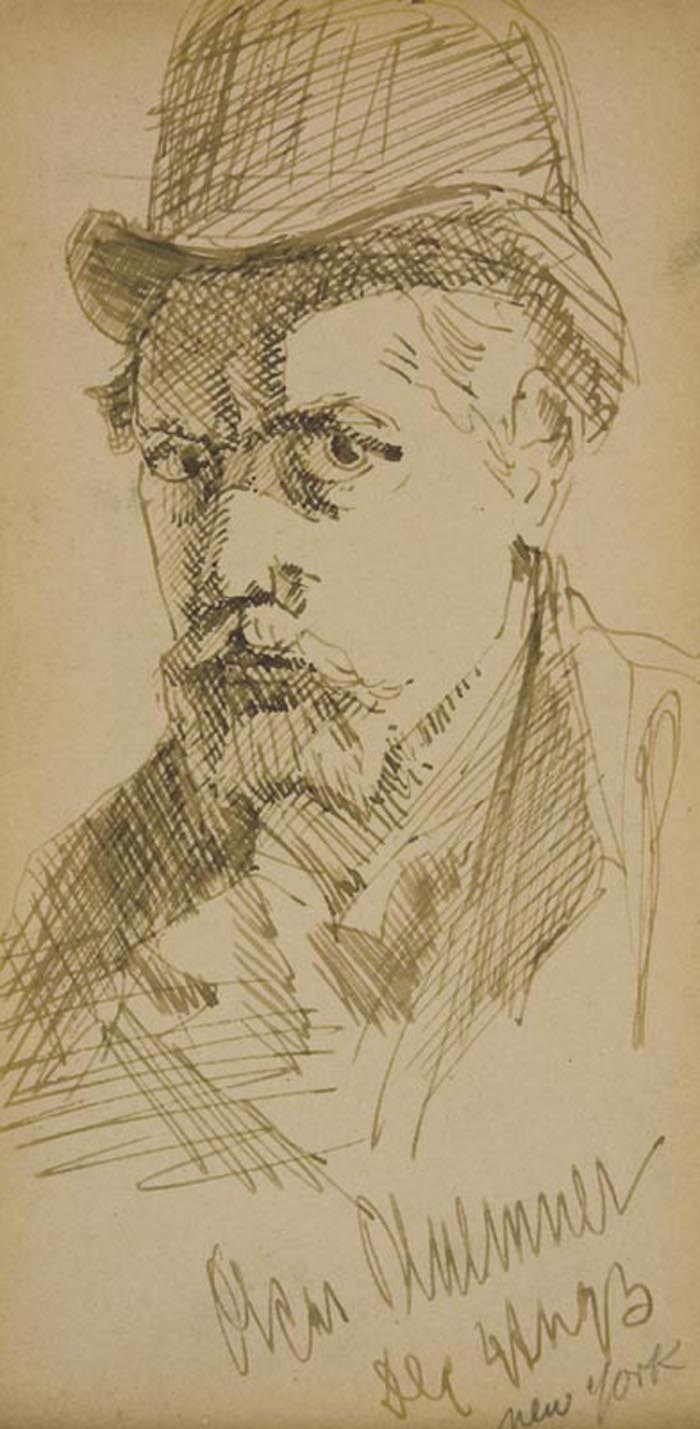
- 1903 self-portrait
- Born: Friedrich Julius Oskar Blümner; June 21, 1867; Prenzlau, Kingdom of Prussia (now Germany)
- Died: January 12, 1938 (aged 70); South Braintree, Massachusetts
- Education: Royal Academy of Design, Berlin
- Known for: Painting, architecture
- Notable work: Bronx Borough Courthouse

Oscar Bluemner (June 21, 1867 – January 12, 1938), born Friedrich Julius Oskar Blümner and after 1933 known as Oscar Florianus Bluemner, was a Prussian-born American Modernist painter.

== Early life ==
Bluemner was born as Friedrich Julius Oskar Blümner in Prenzlau, Kingdom of Prussia (now Germany), on June 21, 1867. He studied painting and architecture at the Royal School of Art in Berlin.

== Architecture ==
Bluemner moved to Chicago in 1893 where he freelanced as a draftsman at the World's Columbian Exposition. After the exposition, he attempted to find work in Chicago. In 1901, he relocated to New York City where he also was unable to find steady employment. In 1903, he created the winning design for the Bronx Borough Courthouse in New York, although it is credited to Michael J. Garvin. The scandal that arose around this took down borough president Louis Haffen for corruption and fraud.

== Painting ==
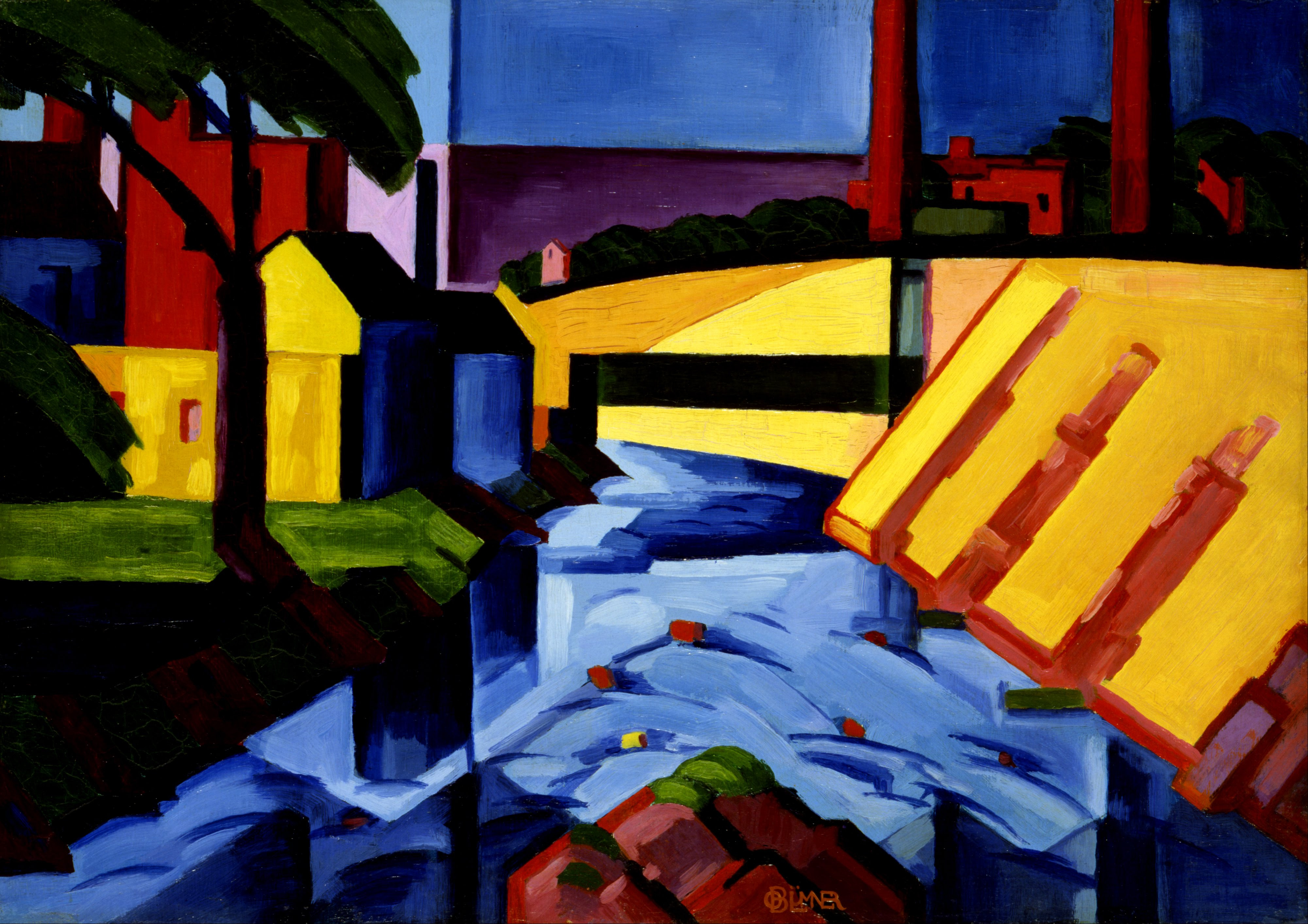
Evening Tones

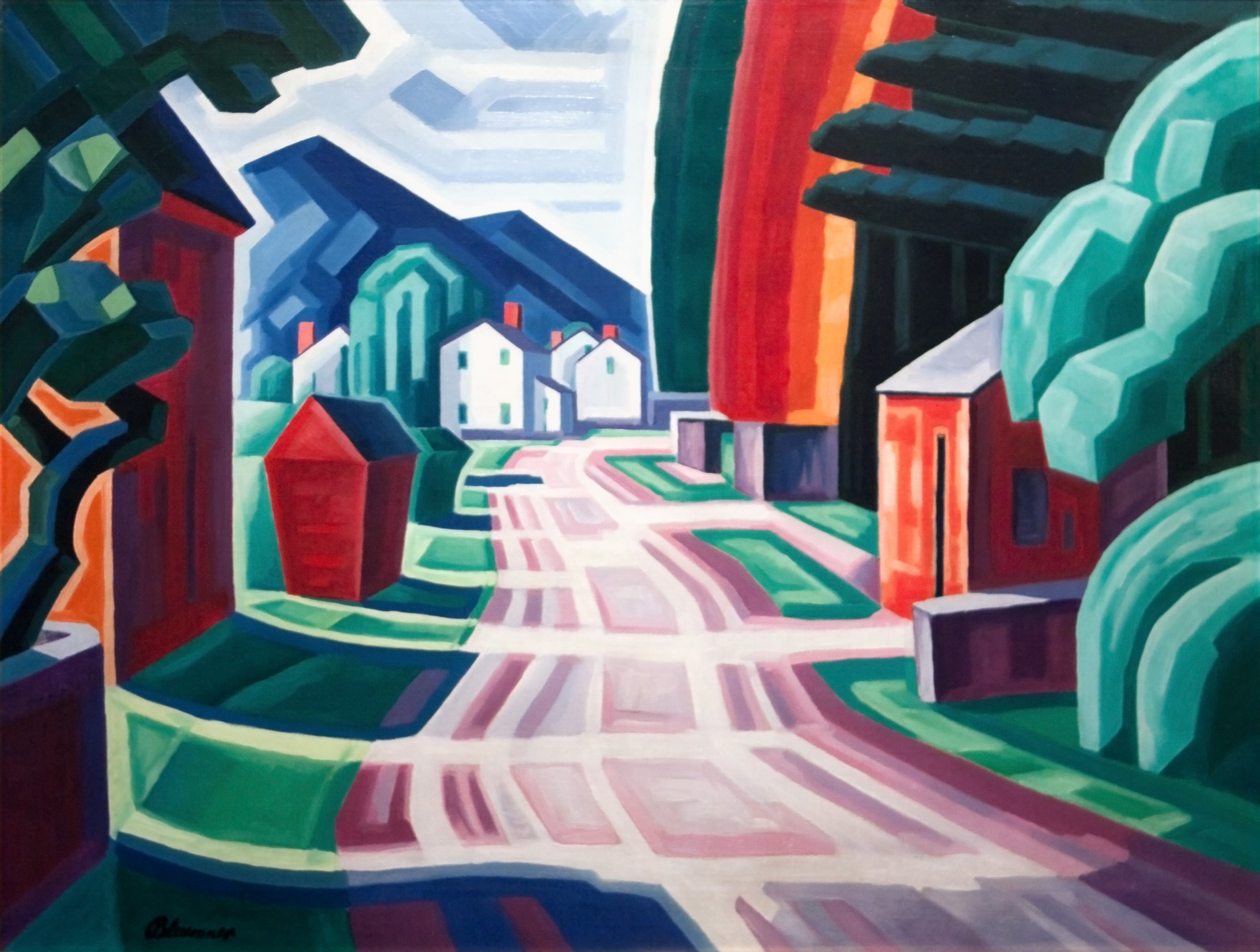
Form and Light, Motif in West New Jersey (1914)

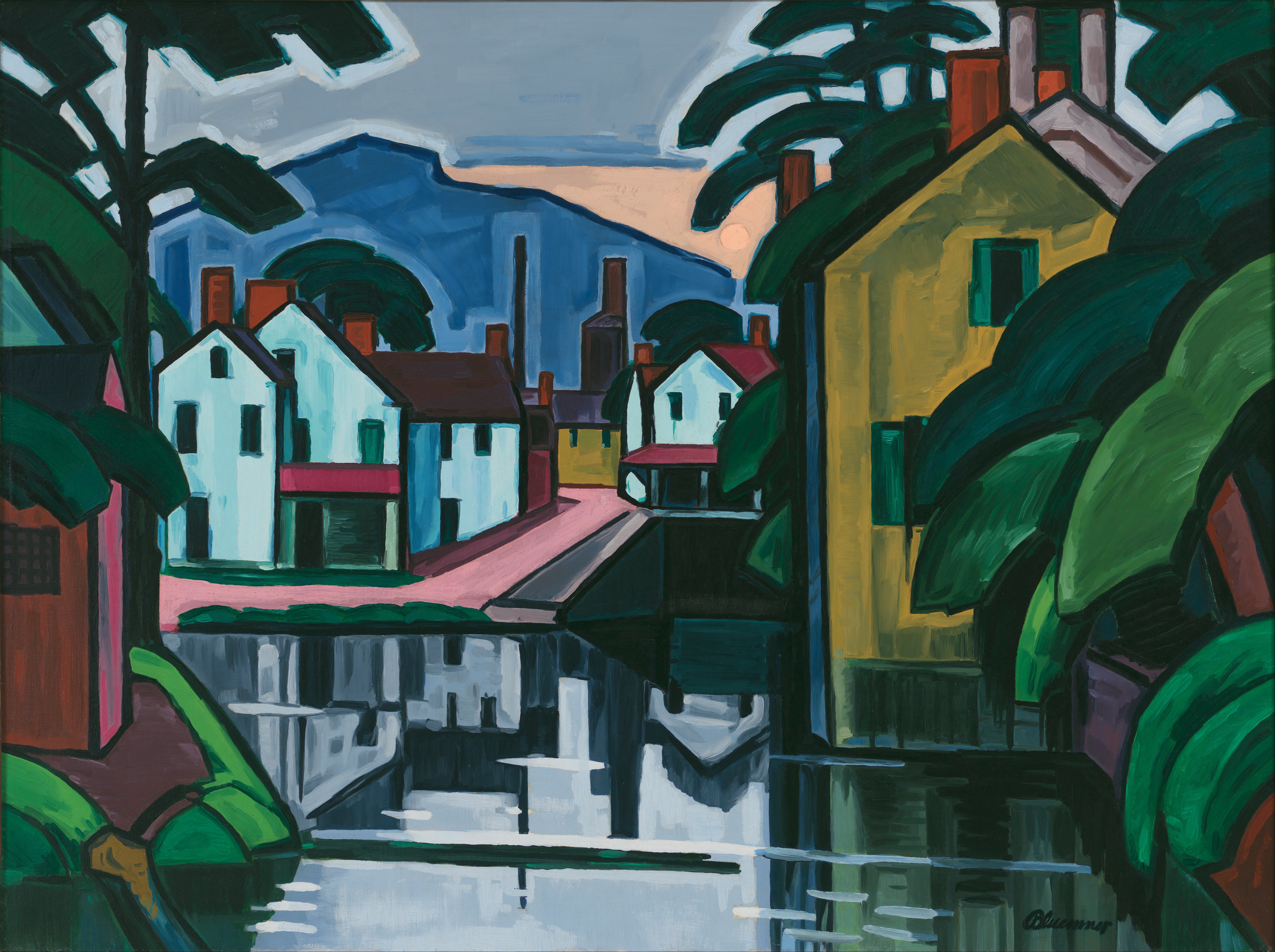
Old Canal Port

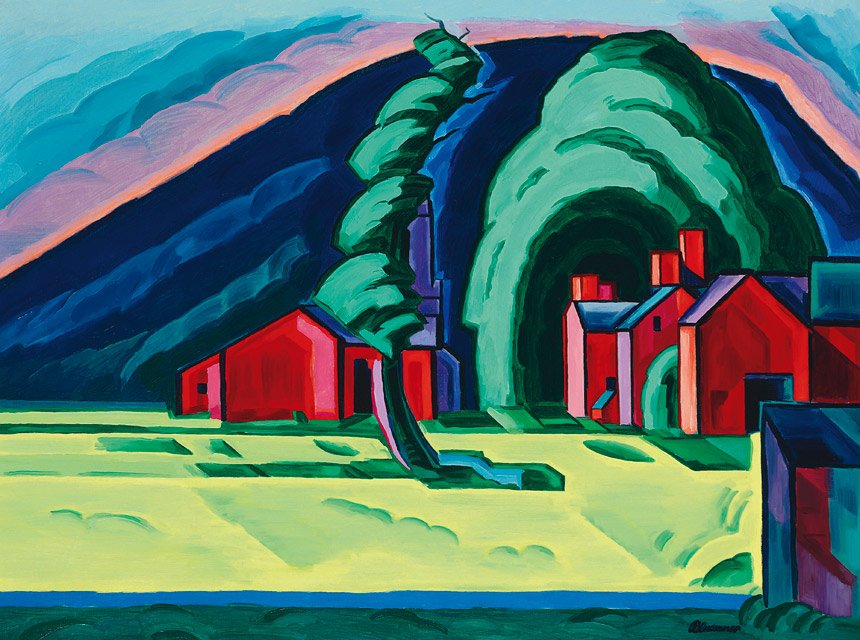
Illusion of a Prairie, New Jersey (Red Farm at Pochuck), 1915

Starting 1910 Bluemner aspired to paint according to the principles advanced by Alfred Stieglitz. Bluemner exhibited in the 1913 Armory Show. He said that the Americans' contribution failed to match that of the Europeans because the American selection process reflected rivalries and compromises rather than curatorial judgment, resulting in a "melée of antagonistic examples". Then in 1915 Stieglitz gave him a solo exhibition at his gallery, 291. Despite participating in several exhibitions, including solo shows, for the next ten years Bluemner failed to sell many paintings and lived with his family in near poverty. He created paintings for the Federal Arts Project in the 1930s.

== Later life ==
After his wife's death in 1926, Bluemner moved to South Braintree, Massachusetts. From there in 1932 he contributed a letter to an ongoing debate in the New York Times on the question "What is American Art?". He wrote:

America sells its shoes, machines, canned beef and so forth in Europe and all over the world not because they have an American style or are wrapped in the American flag, but simply because they are best. Thus also, the French export their paintings and birth-control, and the Germans export sauerkraut and prima donnas, because those things, each, are best. Today, for quality, nationalism, as a race-attribute, means nothing; chemistry, astronomy, or engineering admit, nowhere, of any national flavoring, nor do higher things like religion or philosophy.

Let us, here, make progressive and best painting, each one as he is fit to do, and merely ask: What and when is painting, in a critical sense? ... How can the people agree on what is American style, if the painters themselves, and by their work, disagree profoundly as to what real painting itself is! And there is, and always was, nothing more contemptible, ridiculous and, to art, disastrous, than patrioteering, which thinly veils profiteering.

Ideally, art, pure, is of a sphere and of no country; the first real artists, always and everywhere, have either been importers or immigrants bringing the light with them. El Greco, an immigrant ... defied the Spanish professors ...; we, now, call his work more truly Spanish than that of his local contemporaries. And in the same sense, the future will not fail to stamp that of our own work as peculiarly American in which the living painter, here, has injected no conscious thought of his hailing from Hoboken or Kankakee, and every consideration of pure and modern painting and of the supreme quality he maybe capable of.

He had a successful one-man show in 1935 at the Marie Harriman Gallery in New York City. In the New York Times, Edward Alden Jewell called it Bluemner's "apotheosis". He wrote:

He is very much alive and has been working of late ... with robustious [sic] results. These twenty-eight canvases bear the generic title, "New Landscape Paintings." That is because Mr. Blkuemner feels that some degree of "representation" is essential if abstract ideas are to be put over with entire success. However, the artist more fully and more exactly classifies them as "compositions for color themes." He might, if he chose, even call them "color music" without risking the opprobrium that usually attends excursions into so hazardous a field. ... These startling pictures build harmonies and rhythms that depend as a rule on simple statement. Here we find none of the overtones and undertones that some other artists have employed in projecting visual music. Bluemner relies for his effect upon plain, resonant chords. Though modulations of tone occur, these seem of secondary importance in his scheme. There is decidedly something in this new, bold, exclamatory style.

Bluemner died by suicide on January 12, 1938.

== Legacy ==
Stetson University holds more than 1,000 pieces of Oscar Bluemner's work bequeathed in 1997 by his daughter, Vera Bluemner Kouba. In 2009 the Homer and Dolly Hand Art Center at Stetson opened with a primary mission of housing a providing exhibition space for the Kouba Collection. Often overlooked in his lifetime, Bluemner now is widely acknowledged as a key player in the creation of American artistic Modernism, with better-known colleagues such as Georgia O'Keeffe and John Marin.

In 2013, the Montclair Art Museum in New Jersey presented an exhibition of Bluemner's works depicting the landscapes and industrial areas of Paterson, painted between 1910 and 1917, drawn from the Stetson holdings. It marked the centenary of the Paterson silk strike, which had inspired his politics.

An oil painting by Bluemner, Illusion of a Prairie, New Jersey (Red Farm at Pochuck) (1915) sold at Christie's, New York, for $5,346,500 on November 30, 2011.

== Artworks ==
Year	Title	Image	Collection	Comments
1927	Loving Moon, watercolor, possibly with a surface coating		Brooklyn Museum, Brooklyn, New York City, New York	
1932	Imagination, casein with ground watercolors (prepared by the artist) on paper board	view	Corcoran Gallery of Art, Washington, D.C.	IAP 08260662
