= Bronx Borough Courthouse =

- U.S. National Register of Historic Places
- New York City Landmark
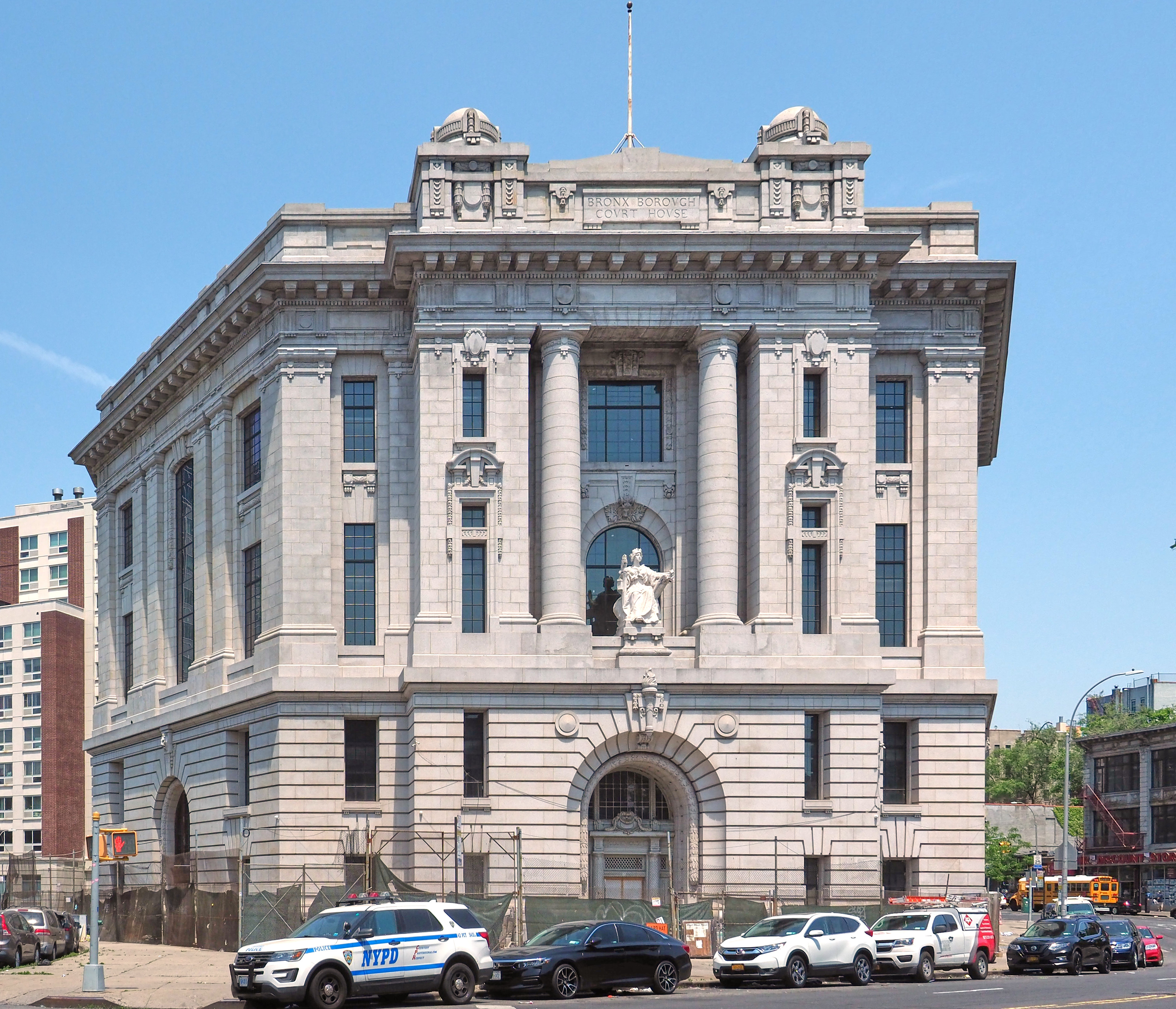
- Front elevation 2021

- Location within New York City
- Location: East 161st Street, Third and Brook Avenues, Melrose, Bronx, New York
- Coordinates: 40°49′22″N 73°54′36″W
- Area: 1 acre (0.40 ha)
- Built: 1905-1914
- Architects: attributed to both Michael John Garvin and Oscar Florianus Bluemner; sculpture by Jules Edouard Roiné
- Architectural style: Beaux-Arts
- NRHP reference No.: 82003344
- NYCL No.: 1076

Significant dates
- Added to NRHP: February 25, 1982
- Designated NYCL: July 28, 1981

The Bronx Borough Courthouse, commonly referred to as the Old Bronx Borough Courthouse, is a building in the Melrose neighborhood of the Bronx, New York City. The courthouse was built between 1905 and 1914 near Boston Road, Third Avenue, St. Anns Avenue, and 161st Street. The 161st Street station of the New York City Subway's IRT Third Avenue elevated was in front of the courthouse. For two decades it housed the Supreme, Surrogate's, and County Courts of the borough until the larger Bronx County Courthouse was built in 1934. The Bronx Branch of the New York City Criminal Court remained here until 1977 when the city formally sealed the doors. It is a National Register of Historic Places listing and a New York City Landmark.

== Architecture ==
Built in Beaux-Arts style, the four story architecture facing south towards Manhattan, was erected with stone granite and adorned internally with lavish stairways, chandeliers, ornaments, and stained glass windows. Its exterior commands two pillars above the entranceway surrounding the throne of Lady Justice (the Greek goddess Themis or Dike) who honors and protects the gates of the law and encompassing city with unwavering and fair judgment. Created by Jules Edouard Roiné, the sculpture is a transcending symbol of the borough's history. Meanwhile, the design for the entire building has been attributed to two architects, Michael John Garvin and Oscar Florianus Bluemner.

== History ==
=== Context and construction ===
For several years, since the annexation of the West Bronx in 1874, several Bronx advocates including Louis F. Haffen, and The Association of the Bar, in the Borough of the Bronx, in the City of New York, had consistently been striving for the placement of a proper court house in the borough. By the turn of the century, their endeavors were awarded as the city allocated funding for a new building that would represent the area and growing population that had increased from 40,000 in 1874 to more than 200,000 by 1900.

In 1903, the first president of the borough, Louis F. Haffen bestowed the contract for a courthouse design worth $40,000 to then Building Commissioner, the first of the borough, Michael J. Garvin, a graduate of Manhattan College and an experienced architect who created the Haffen Building (1901–1902). Garvin soon left his position in office to focus on the design and construction of the courthouse which was to be of great significance. Despite early efforts, his initial concepts were rejected by the New York Art Commission, which denoted them as substandard to the goal being attempted for the site. Left with the task still at hand, Garvin sought various consulting architects in the city to assist with planning. Over the course, he met with underemployed architect, Oscar Florianus Bluemner, a German immigrant who had been a prize student at Berlin's Royal Academy of Design. It presented a fortuitous opportunity for both men to collaborate. Though the story not fully concrete, it is believed that Garvin offered to share fees and credit for their combined efforts in return for an acceptable building. Garvin eventually submitted a design that was well received by the Art Commission.

Outraged of the news, Bluemner scandalized Garvin and claimed that the two had entered into an agreement which Garvin did not uphold. Bluemner sued and (controversially) won. His testimony led to an array of investigations. Since Borough President Haffen, considered to be a prominent and noble representative in office, was the delegate in charge who entrusted Garvin with the plan, he resigned in order to extinguish any attempts to taint the view of the resourcefulness and flourishing development in the prosperous borough. Bluemner, was awarded one-quarter of the amount he claimed to be owed. It was concluded that Garvin had majority credit for the building. In disappointment and clouded by controversy, Bluemner left the profession and turned to painting. Garvin remained as supervising architect through the beginning and completion of the project from 1905 to 1914. The population increased to over 500,000 and the total construction cost of the building amounted to $2,000,000. Bronx Borough Courthouse soon opened its doors to the judicial system and was the center of ordinance for the next twenty years.

=== Court relocation and closure ===
By 1930, the population of Bronx skyrocketed to 1.25 million, with more than a million residents added since 1900. Due to the unforeseeable expansion, the city invested $8,000,000 in building a new Bronx County Courthouse completed in 1934. The majority of the departments moved to the spacious facility, leaving only a police court at the Third Avenue site until 1977, when the building was officially closed by the city. By 1973 the Third Avenue elevated was eliminated, and with it the only direct rapid transit access to the location. The building was used for 58 years. During the decline of the borough in the 1970s, vandals destroyed parts of the interior of the property by stripping metalwork and breaking irreplaceable features. Soon, city intervention sealed all doorways and windows with concrete blocks leaving the facility dormant and bound in graffiti for a couple of decades.

Questioning the financial need of maintaining the Old Bronx Borough Courthouse as an asset, different city officials suggested razing the building. Many historians, community leaders, and preservationists sought to keep the building alive, so not to repeat the travesty of Bronx Borough Hall; it obtained Landmark status in 1981, protecting it for future possibilities. However, after thirty years, the building is currently on the Landmarks Conservancy's most endangered list due to lack of serious repairs and proper usage.

=== Sale and redevelopment ===
After its closure, countless proposals were put forth to reuse the space either for civic or public purpose. However the landmarked structure proved to be too costly and complex and could not be financed by many interested Bronx community groups. In 1996 it was sold for $130,000 at a 1 Police Plaza auction to Gus Kitkas, owner of the Five Borough Electrical Supply Corporation in Astoria. In 1998 it was auctioned again and sold for $300,000 to Henry Weinstein, a citywide and Brooklyn private developer, for development, In 2011, Weinstein and partners looked to rehabilitate the Grey Lady. A much-needed exterior cleaning was performed. A full set of plans was drawn and approved for an interior enhancement, to include uses such as office, medical offices, or community facility.

Beyond 2005, a revival of critical interest has surfaced for Oscar Bluemner's paintings, being honored at a show at the Whitney Museum of American Art that year and having garnered widespread attention. However, official Landmark records continue to acknowledge Garvin as the sole designer of the courthouse. There are several contemporary points of views as to who really designed the building, though Garvin ultimately completed the entire construction.

An art show ran in the old courthouse in May and June 2015. In mid-2016, the old courthouse was considered as a location for the Universal Hip Hop Museum, though this was later dropped. The following year, it was announced that the courthouse would be used as a location for the 1,200-seat Success Academy High School of the Liberal Arts, part of the Success Academy Charter Schools system. However, that plan also fell through, and as of May 2014, the building is for sale at an asking price of $35 million.

Details
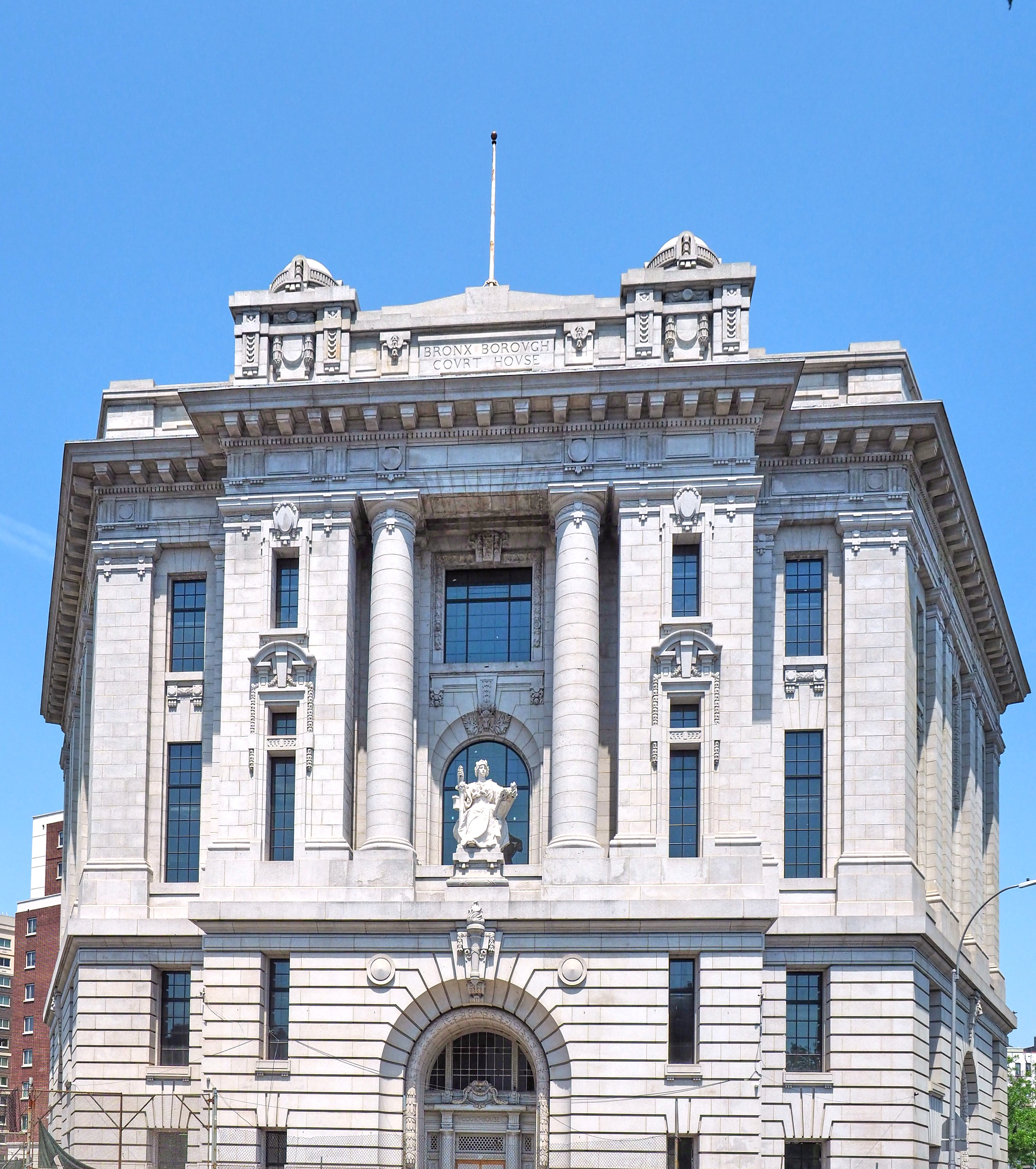
Front elevation, 2021

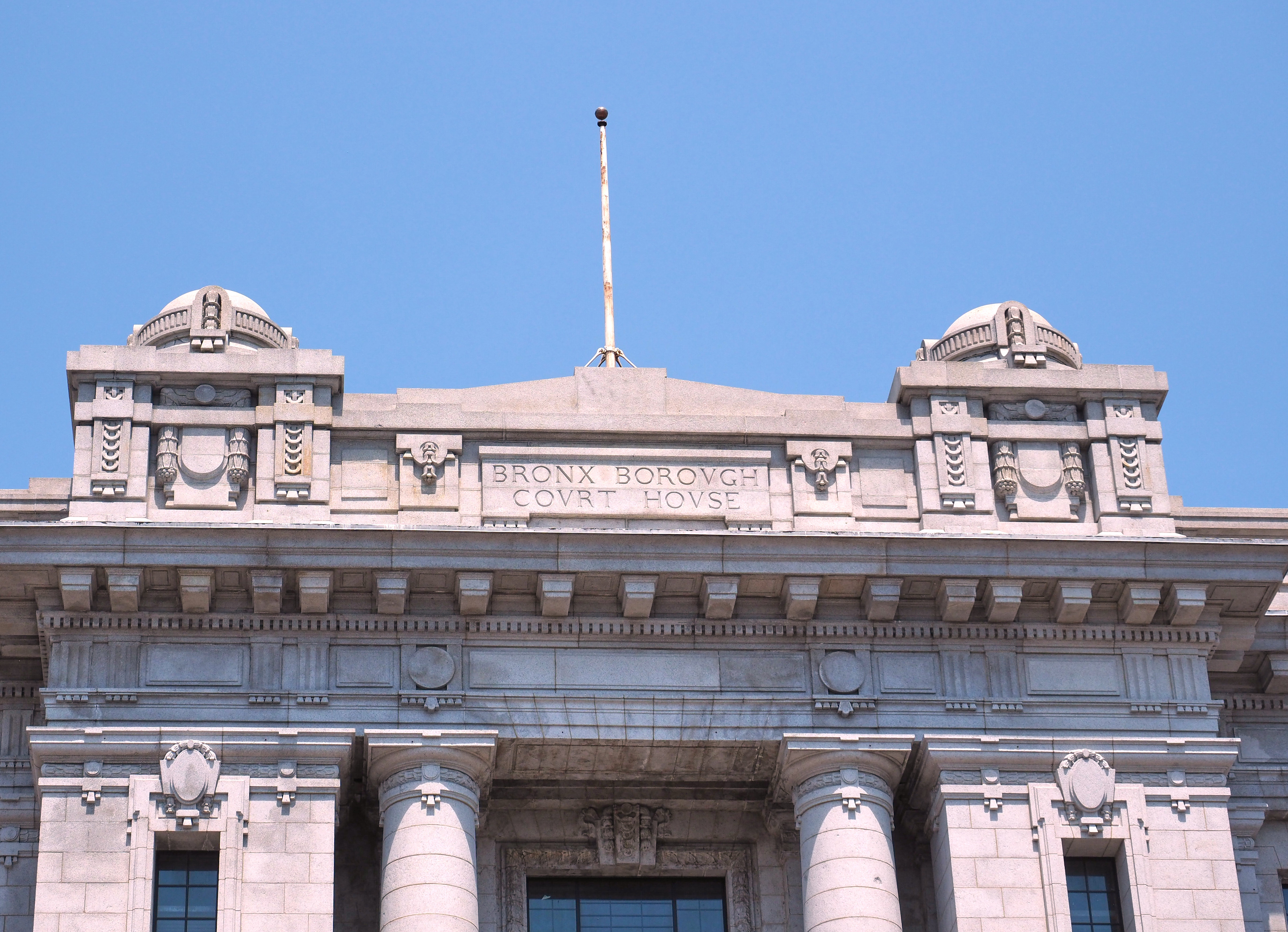
Cornice detail

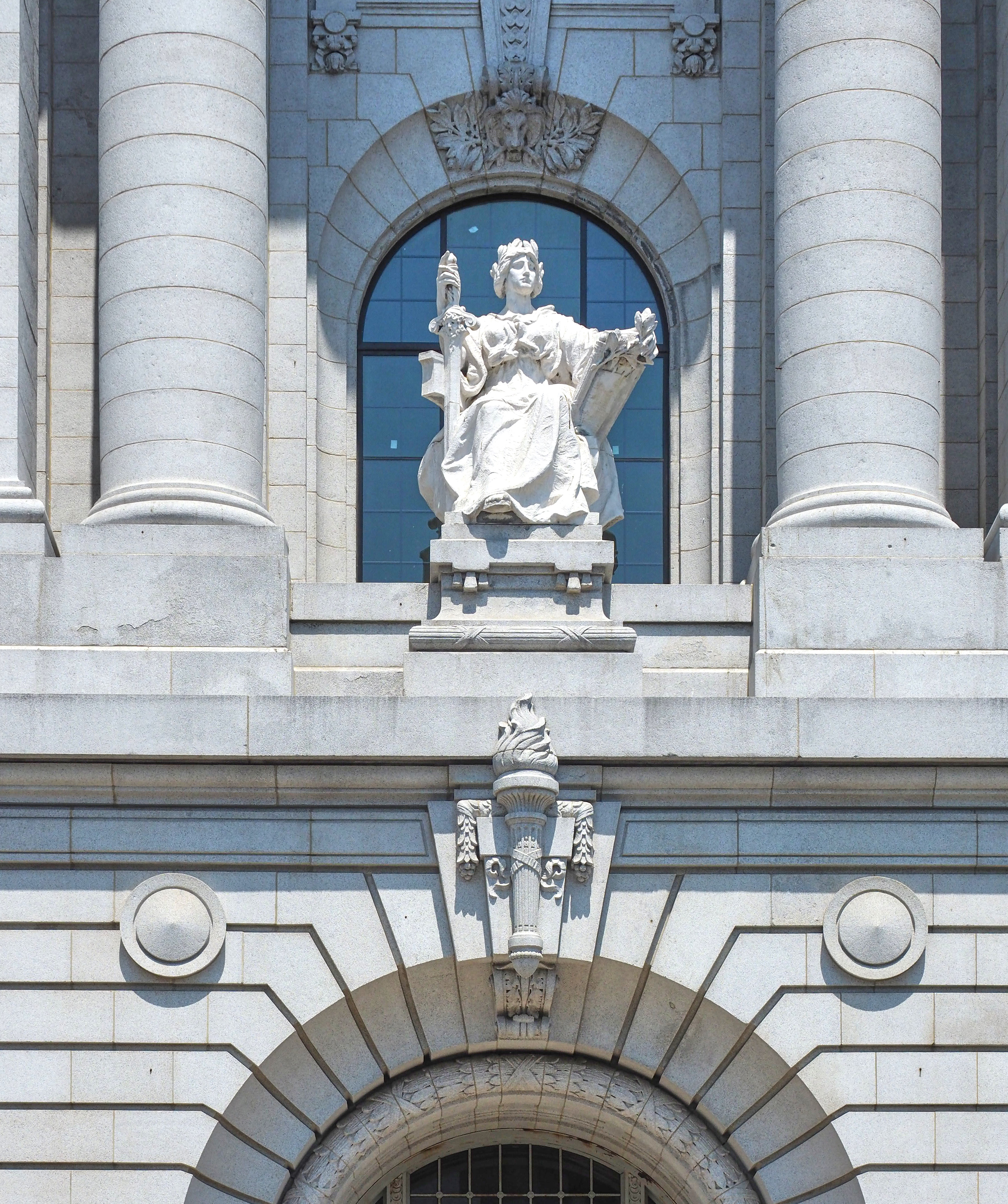
Front detail

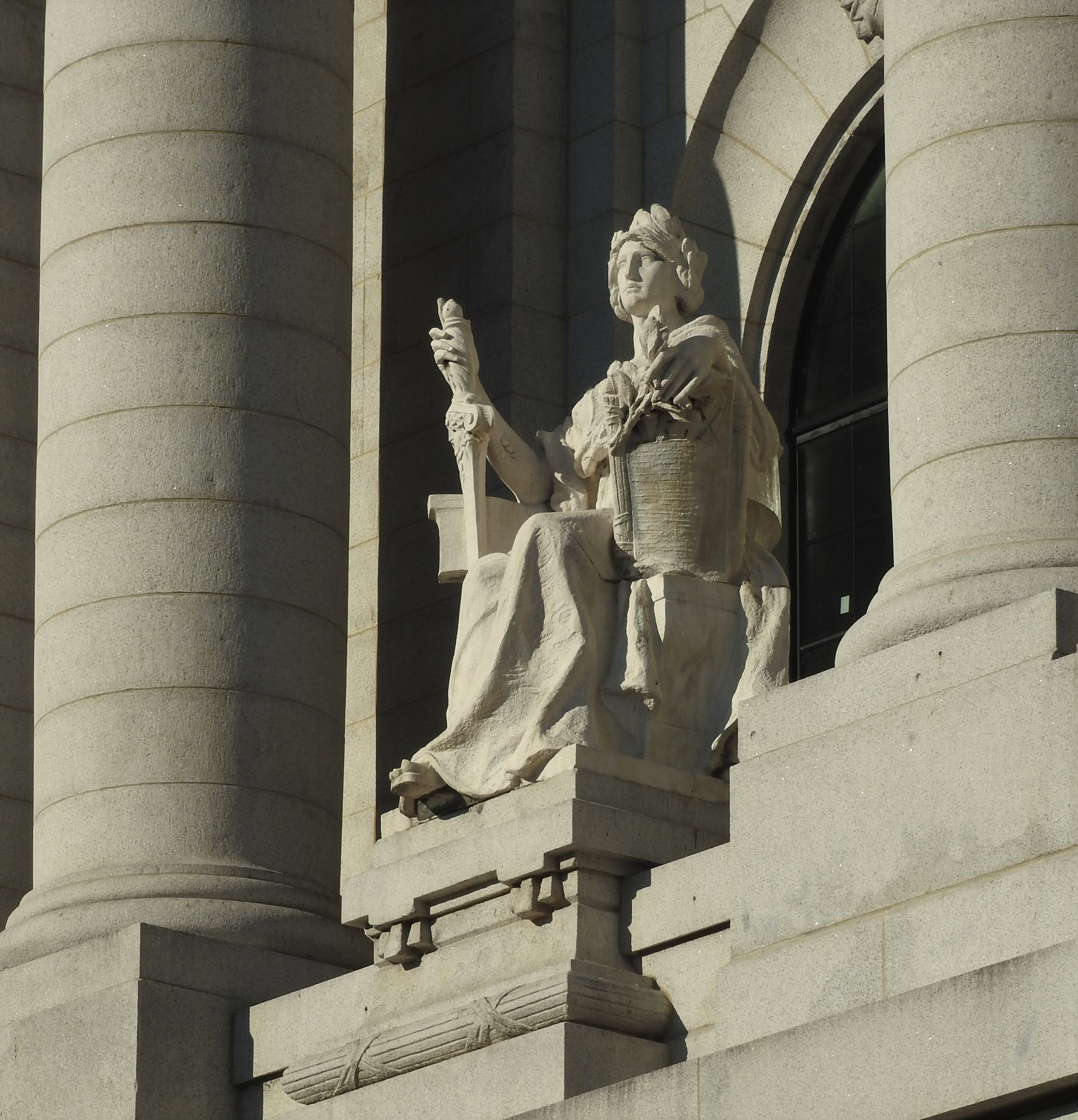
Statue

== See also ==
- Bronx Borough Hall
- Bronx County Courthouse
- National Register of Historic Places listings in Bronx County, New York
- List of New York City Designated Landmarks in The Bronx
