= Louis F. Haffen =

American politician (1854–1935)

Louis Francis Haffen
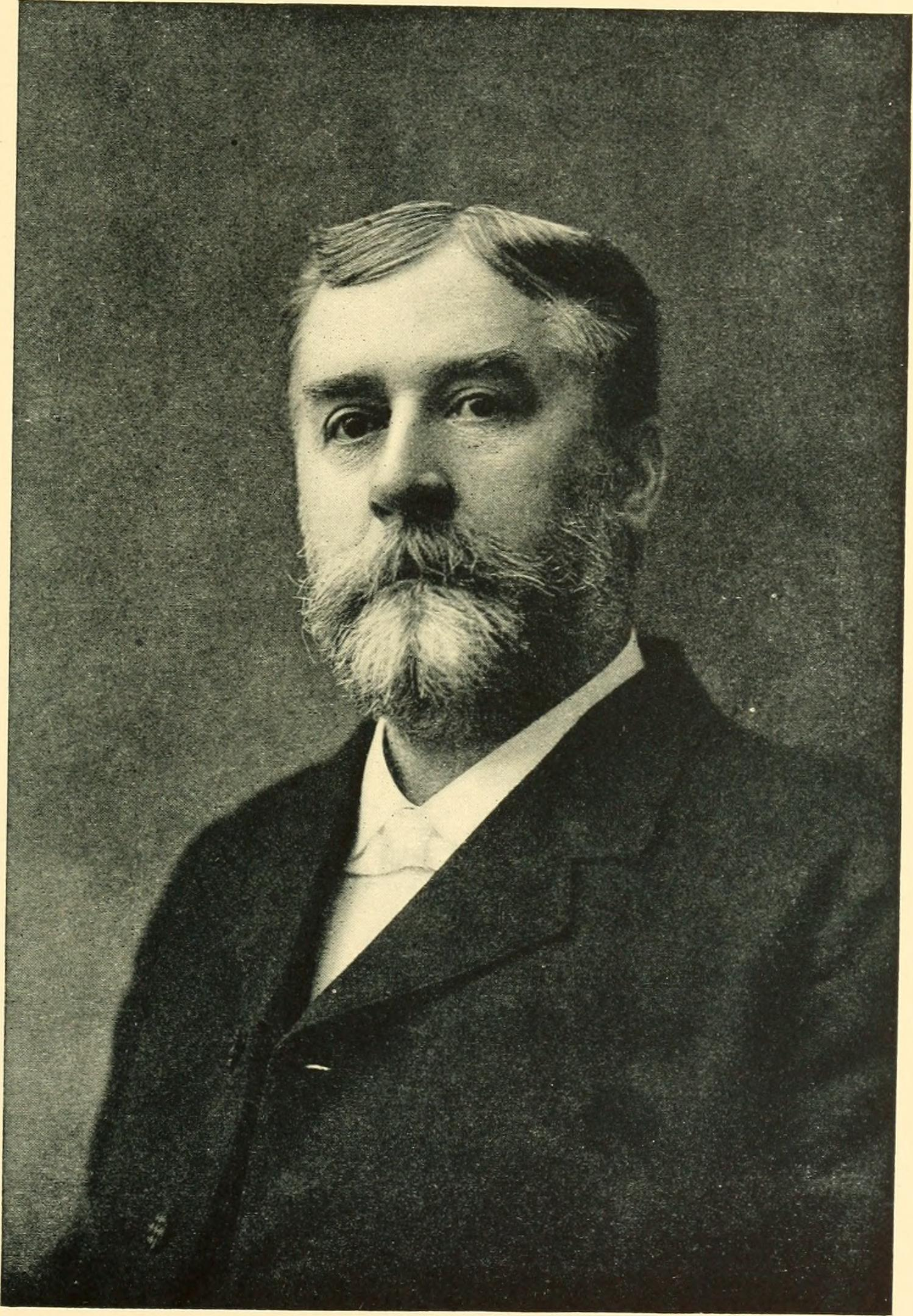

1st Borough President of The Bronx
- In office January 1, 1898 – August 29, 1909
- Succeeded by: John F. Murray

Personal details
- Born: November 6, 1854 Melrose, New York, U.S.
- Died: December 25, 1935 (aged 81) New York City, U.S.

Louis Francis Haffen (November 6, 1854 – December 25, 1935) was an American engineer and politician who was the first Bronx Borough President. He was elected four times and was known as the "Father of the Bronx." He was a member of the Democratic Party.

== Early life and education ==
Of German-Irish descent, Haffen was born in Melrose, Westchester County (present-day Bronx), New York, the son of Haffen Brewery founder Matthias Haffen, an immigrant from Bavaria. His mother, Catharine Hayes, was born in Ireland. He was educated at the University of Niagara before transferring to Fordham University (known at the time as St. John's College) in 1872, earning a B.A in 1875. The following year, Haffen entered the School of Mines at Columbia University, graduating in 1879 as a civil and mining engineer.

== Career ==
Haffen went out West for two years to work as an engineer. In 1883, he returned to New York and took an engineering job at the Parks Department, which was then overseeing new streets and thoroughfares. He later became Commissioner of Street Improvements in the 23rd and 24th Wards until 1897. He was credited with making significant improvements in these wards, which were mostly farm land at the time without modern streets and utilities.

In 1897, when the borough became part of New York City, Haffen was elected as the first president of the Bronx, and re-elected three times. As Borough President he selected contractors in 1897 to pave Jerome Avenue. Three sections of the road were to be remodeled, costing the Bronx about $136,505.

While borough president, Haffen worked with Michael J. Garvin. Garvin is credited with the design of the Haffen Building and the Bronx Borough Courthouse (built between 1905 and 1915), but a scandal arose when it was discovered that Garvin was not the architect. Oscar Florianus Bluemner was the real architect, and the allegations of plagiarism and fraud in relation to who designed the courthouse forced Louis Haffen's resignation from office amid accusations of cronyism, fraud and corruption. After leaving office, he resumed work as a consulting engineer for the Bronx Borough.

== Personal life ==
He was married to Caroline Kurz in 1886. They had five sons, Mathias, Louis Jr., Henry, John and Thomas, and a daughter, Beatrice W. Haffen Havender. He died on Christmas Day, 1935 at his home on East 162nd Street in the Bronx. The cause of death was reported to heart problems and he had been home-bound since the previous summer. He is interred at Woodlawn Cemetery.

Haffen Park in the northeast Bronx is named after him.

Political offices
Preceded by office created	Borough President of Bronx; 1898-1909	Succeeded by John F. Murray
