= Haffen Building =

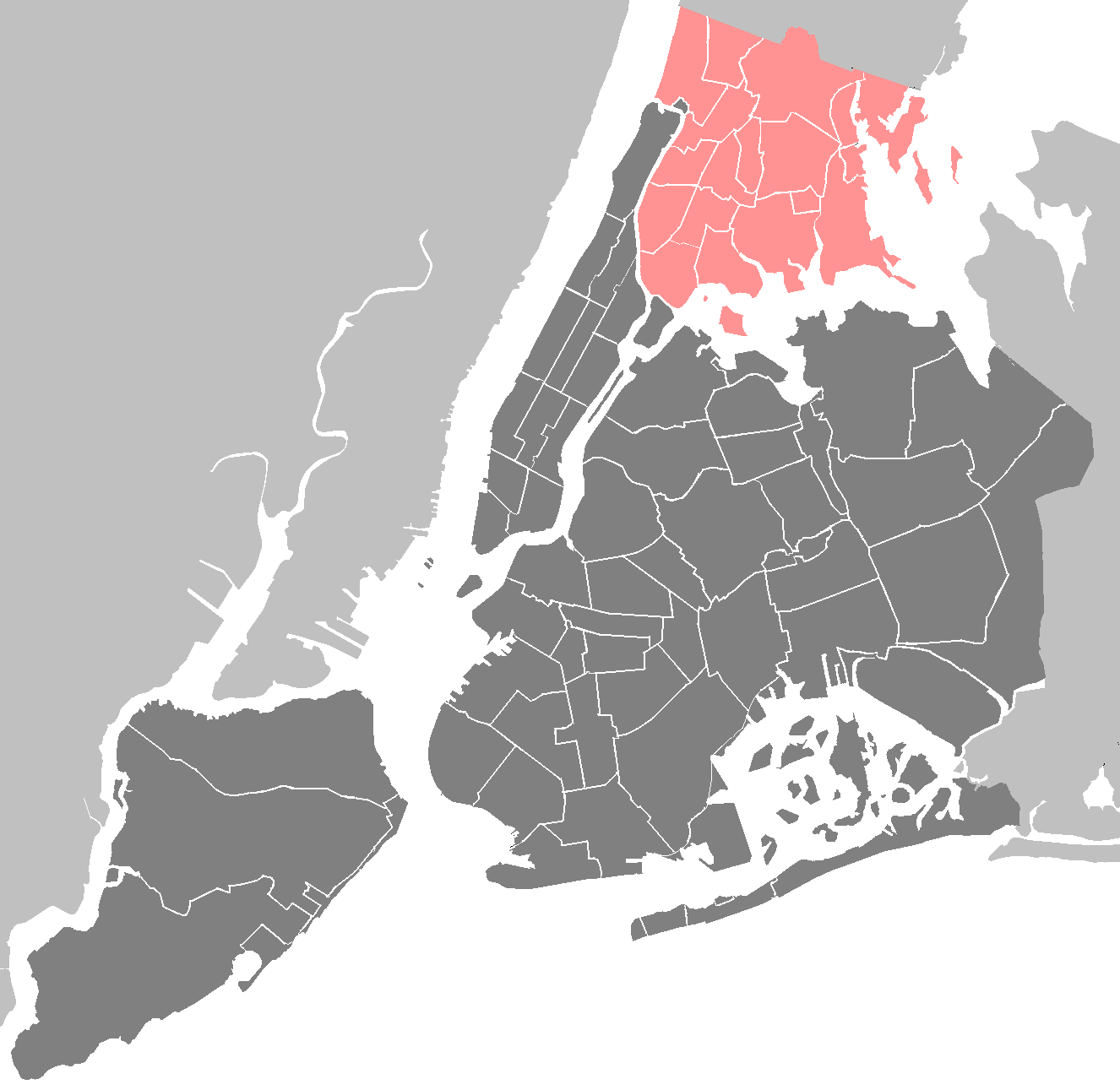
- Location within Bronx

General information
- Type: Office
- Location: 2804 Third Avenue, Bronx, New York City, New York
- Coordinates: 40.815243°N 73.918731°W
- Construction started: 1902

Design and construction
- Architect: Michael J. Garvin

New York City Landmark
- Designated: June 22, 2010
- Reference no.: 2388

The Haffen Building is a New York City landmark constructed in 1901–1902 in the neighborhood of Mott Haven, Bronx, New York. The building is located at 2804 Third Avenue, also addressed as 507 Willis Avenue, in the middle of a triangular block between 148th Street, 147th Street, Third Avenue, and Willis Avenue, within the Hub business district. It was inspired by the economic growth and upper middle-class status that was prevalent in the area during the period. When constructed, the Third Avenue and Second Avenue elevated train lines stopped at 149th Street, a station in front of it.

Matthias Haffen was a member of the prominent Haffen family, founders of the famous Haffen Brewing Company. As an active real estate developer, he wanted to erect a first-class office building for banking and professional tenants. He turned to then Bronx Commissioner of Buildings, architect Michael J. Garvin, who had been working with Mathias' brother, then Bronx Borough President Louis F. Haffen. Mathias sought Garvin's experience with the area. The two, with Garvin's design, created the Haffen Building, a seven story Beaux-Arts style office complex. For over a century, the Haffen Building housed several banks, law offices, and governmental agencies. Notable occupants have been the Knickerbocker Trust Company (with the next door Hub Center Building at 2810 Third Avenue also addressed as 509 Willis Avenue), the Dollar Savings Bank of New York City, the National Puerto Rican Day Parade, Inc.; and the law offices of Javier A. Solano. The building is currently regarded as a "distinct structure" which "is an outstanding and remarkably intact example of Beaux-Arts aesthetic.
