= Bronx County Courthouse =

- U.S. National Register of Historic Places
- New York City Landmark
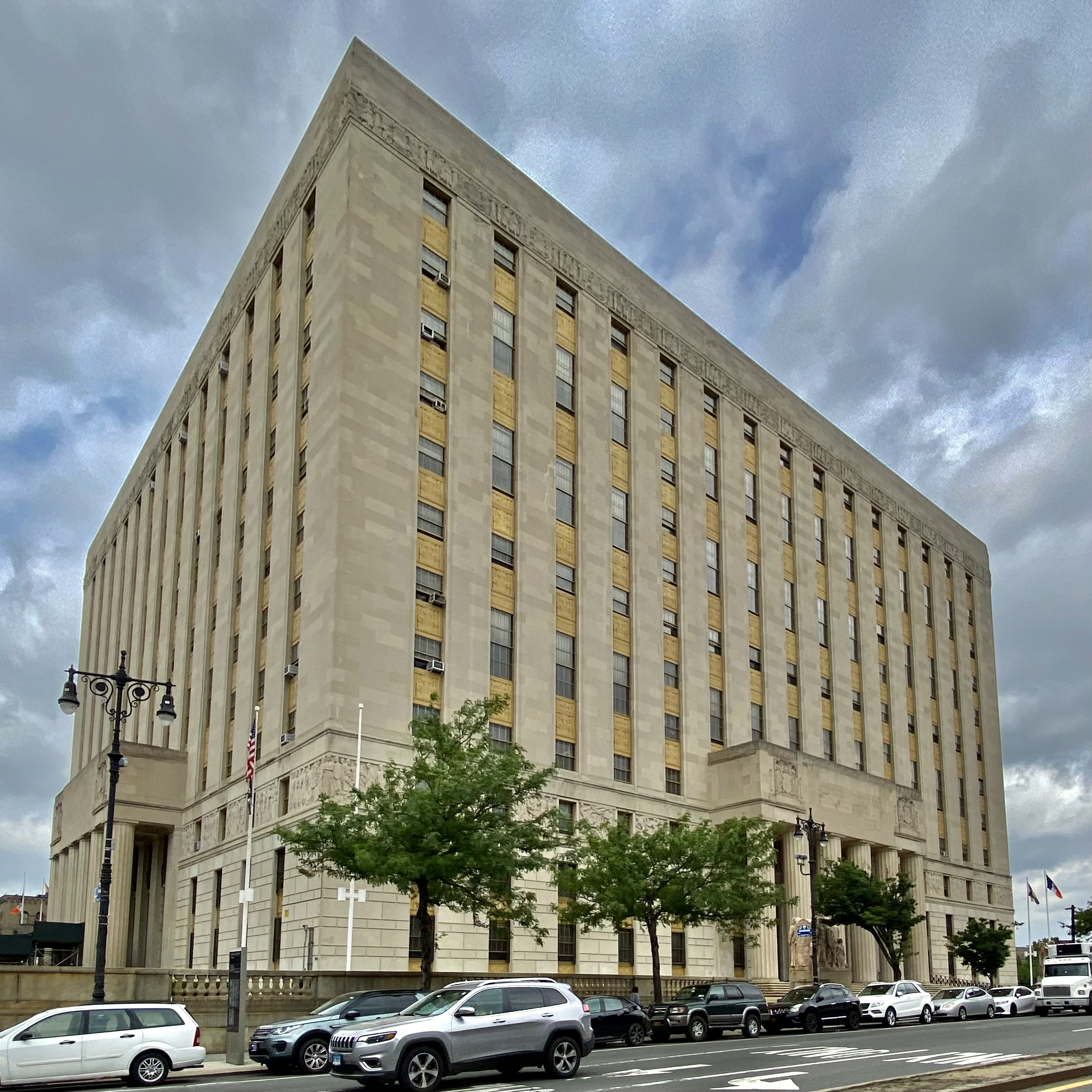

- Location within New York City Location within New York Location within the United States
- Location: 851 Grand Concourse; Bronx, New York
- Coordinates: 40°49′34″N 73°55′27″W
- Built: 1931
- Architects: Joseph H. Freelander; Max Hausle
- Architectural style: Classical Revival, Neo-Classical
- NRHP reference No.: 83001636
- NYCL No.: 0928

Significant dates
- Added to NRHP: September 8, 1983
- Designated NYCL: July 13, 1976

The Bronx County Courthouse, also known as the Mario Merola Building, is a historic courthouse building located in the Concourse and Melrose neighborhoods of the Bronx in New York City. It was designed in 1931 and built between 1931 and 1934. It is a nine-story limestone building on a rusticated granite base in the Art Deco style. It has four identical sides, an interior court, and a frieze designed by noted sculptor Charles Keck. The sculptures on the 161st Street side are by noted sculptor George Holburn Snowden. Two sculptural groups on the Walton Avenue side are by noted sculptor Joseph Kiselewski. Kiselewski collaborated with Adolph A. Weinman to create the work. The Bronx Museum of the Arts was once located on the main floor. The building stands two blocks east-southeast of Yankee Stadium, and across 161st Street from Joyce Kilmer Park.

While never officially titled 'Borough Hall', the Bronx County Courthouse houses all municipal borough functions, and is listed as a borough hall on maps by the Metropolitan Transportation Authority. The previous freestanding Bronx Borough Hall was damaged by fire and torn down in 1969, but had stopped operating in an official capacity long before this.

== Murals ==
The first floor's Veterans Memorial Hall houses four 10-by-36-foot (3.0 by 11.0 m) murals, one per wall, by James Monroe Hewlett, depicting historic events in the Bronx. The murals were unveiled in June 1934 and feature the following historical events:

- The Arrival of Jonas Bronck – 1639, in what is now Mott Haven.
- The First Meeting of the Westchester County Court – 1764, in what is now Westchester Square.
- The Battle of Pell's Point – October 18, 1776, in what is now Pelham Bay Park.
- The Departure of George Washington from the Van Cortlandt House – November 1783 in what is now Van Cortlandt Park.

A mural depicting the arrival of Jonas Bronck, considered the founder of the borough, was created in the early 1930s by James Monroe Hewlett. The mural was damaged by workers in August 2013. Many people, including the proprietor of Jonas Bronck's Beer Co and a reported descendant of Laurens Duyts, a Danish farmer who traveled to New Amsterdam with Bronck on his ship Fire of Troy, sought the mural's restoration prior to the 100th anniversary of the Bronx's separation from New York County in 2014.

It was listed on the National Register of Historic Places in 1983.

== Renaming ==
In February 1988, Mayor Edward Koch renamed the Bronx County Courthouse to the Mario Merola Building to honor the late Bronx County District Attorney Mario Merola.

== See also ==
- Bronx Borough Hall
- Bronx Borough Courthouse
- Bronx court system delays
- List of New York City borough halls and municipal buildings
- National Register of Historic Places listings in Bronx County, New York
- List of New York City Designated Landmarks in The Bronx
